= Ryskulov, Almaty =

Ryskulov Рысқұлов, Rysqulov (Kazakh) Рыскулово (Russian)
- Village
- Location in Kazakhstan
- Coordinates: 43°17′59″N 77°17′11″E
- Country: Kazakhstan
- Region: Almaty Region
- District: Talǵar District

Population (2009)
  - Total: 2,979
- Time zone: UTC+6 (ALMT)
- Postal code: 041622
- Area code: 72774
- Vehicle registration: B, V and 05 (region)

Ryskulov (Kazakh: Рысқұлов, romanized: Rysqūlov; Kazakh pronunciation: [ɾəsqʊlov]) is a village (selo) in the Talǵar District of Almaty Region, in south-eastern part of Kazakhstan. It is named after Soviet politician Turar Ryskulov. The KATO code is 196233800.

== Demographics ==
=== Population ===
Population: 2,387 (1999 census results). (1187 males and 1200 females). As of 2009, the population of Ryskulov was 2979 inhabitants (1479 males and 1500 females).

== Notable residents ==
- Karakat Bashanova (born 2008), runner up of the 2020 Junior Eurovision Song Contest.
