= Spain in the Junior Eurovision Song Contest 2020 =

- Junior Eurovision Song Contest 2020
- Participating broadcaster: Radiotelevisión Española (RTVE)
- Country: Spain
- Selection process: Internal selection
- Announcement date: Artist: 9 September 2020; Song: 7 October 2020

Competing entry
- Song: "Palante"
- Artist: Soleá
- Songwriters: Bruno Valverde; Hajar Sbihi; César G. Ross

Placement
- Final result: 3rd, 133 points

Participation chronology

Spain was represented at the Junior Eurovision Song Contest 2020 with the song "Palante", written by Bruno Valverde, Hajar Sbihi, and César G. Ross, and performed by Soleá. The Spanish participating broadcaster, Radiotelevisión Española (RTVE), internally selected its entry for the contest.

== Background ==
Prior to the 2020 contest, Televisión Española (TVE) until 2006, and Radiotelevisión Española (RTVE) in 2019, had participated in the Junior Eurovision Song Contest representing Spain five times since TVE's debut in the inaugural edition. They won in 2004 with the song "Antes muerta que sencilla", performed by María Isabel. In 2019, Spain was represented by the song "Marte", performed by Melani García placing 3rd in a field of 19 entries with 212 points.

== Before Junior Eurovision ==
RTVE confirmed its participation in the Junior Eurovision Song Contest 2020 in July 2020. RTVE announced that Soleá had been internally selected to represent Spain on 9 September 2020. In September 2020, RTVE announced that Bruno Valverde, Hajar Sbihi (ASHA) and César G. Ross had composed the Spanish entry. The entry's title, "Palante", and a preview of the song were released to the public on 29 September 2020. The song was released in full on 7 October 2020.

== Artist and song information ==
=== Soleá ===
Soleá Fernández Moreno (born 19 June 2011), better known as Soleá, is a Spanish singer who represented Spain in the Junior Eurovision Song Contest 2020.

=== Palante ===
"Palante" (English: Move On) is a song by Spanish singer Soleá, written by Bruno Valverde, Hajar Sbihi (ASHA) and César G. Ross. It represented Spain at the Junior Eurovision Song Contest 2020.

== At Junior Eurovision ==
After the opening ceremony, which took place on 23 November 2020, it was announced that Spain would perform tenth on 29 November 2020, following Russia and preceding Ukraine.

=== Voting ===
The same voting system that was introduced in the 2017 edition was used, where the results were determined by 50% online voting and 50% jury voting. Every participating broadcaster assembled a national jury that consisted of three music industry professionals and two children aged between 10 and 15 who were citizens of the country they represented. The rankings of those jurors were combined to make an overall top ten.

The online voting consisted of two phases. The first phase of the online voting began on 27 November 2020 when a recap of all the rehearsal performances was shown on the contest's website Junioreurovision.tv before the viewers could vote. After this, voters also had the option to watch longer one-minute clips from each participant's rehearsal. This first round of voting ended on 29 November at 15:59 CET. The second phase of the online voting took place during the live show and began right after the last performance and was open for 15 minutes. International viewers were able to vote for three songs. They were also able to vote for their own country's song. These votes were then turned into points which were determined by the percentage of votes received. For example, if a song received 10% of the votes, it received 10% of the available points.

Points awarded to Spain
Score	Country
12 points	
10 points	Germany; Netherlands
8 points	Ukraine
7 points	Belarus; Poland
6 points	Serbia
5 points	Russia
4 points	Malta
3 points	
2 points	Kazakhstan
1 point	Georgia
Spain received 73 points from the online vote

Points awarded by Spain
Score	Country
12 points	Georgia
10 points	Netherlands
8 points	Ukraine
7 points	Malta
6 points	France
5 points	Belarus
4 points	Kazakhstan
3 points	Russia
2 points	Poland
1 point	Serbia

==== Detailed voting results ====
The following members comprised the Spanish jury:

- Emilio Mercader – music producer
- Jaime Terrón – singer
- Lola González – choreographer and artistic director
- Two kids from the music industry

Detailed voting results from Spain
Draw	Country	Juror A	Juror B	Juror C	Juror D	Juror E	Rank	Points
01	Germany	11	9	10	11	11	11	
02	Kazakhstan	6	8	8	3	8	7	4
03	Netherlands	2	1	2	7	7	2	10
04	Serbia	10	10	9	5	6	10	1
05	Belarus	9	11	11	2	3	6	5
06	Poland	7	6	6	6	9	9	2
07	Georgia	5	7	4	1	1	1	12
08	Malta	1	4	1	8	10	4	7
09	Russia	8	5	7	9	4	8	3
10	Spain							
11	Ukraine	4	3	5	4	2	3	8
12	France	3	2	3	10	5	5	6
