= The Voice Kids (Polish TV series) series 3 =

The Voice Kids
- Series 3
- Hosted by: Tomasz Kammel; Ida Nowakowska-Herndon; Jan Dąbrowski (V Reporter)
- Judges: Tomson & Baron; Dawid Kwiatkowski; Cleo
- Winner: Marcin Maciejczak

Release
- Original network: TVP2
- Original release: January 1 – February 22, 2020

Series chronology
- ← Previous; Series 2 Next → Series 4

The Voice Kids is a Polish reality music talent show for aspiring singers aged 8 to 15, airing on TVP2. The third season premiered on New Year's Day 2020. Tomson & Baron, Dawid Kwiatkowski and Cleo returned as coaches. Tomasz Kammel returned as host, with Ida Nowakowska-Herndon as the new host, replacing Barbara Kurdej-Szatan. Marcin Maciejczak won the season, marking Dawid Kwiatkowski's first win as a coach.

== Coaches ==
Coaches gallery

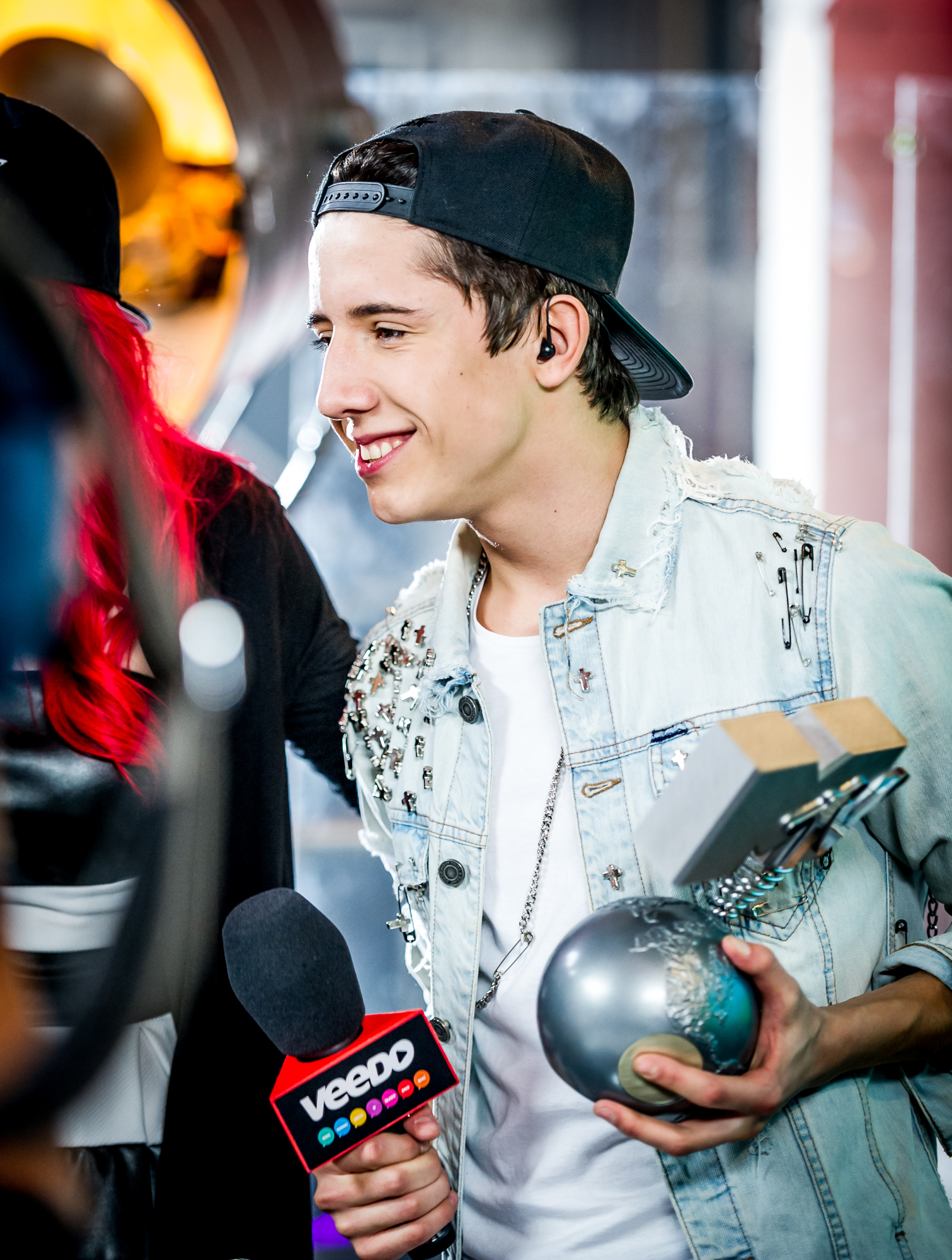
Dawid Kwiatkowski

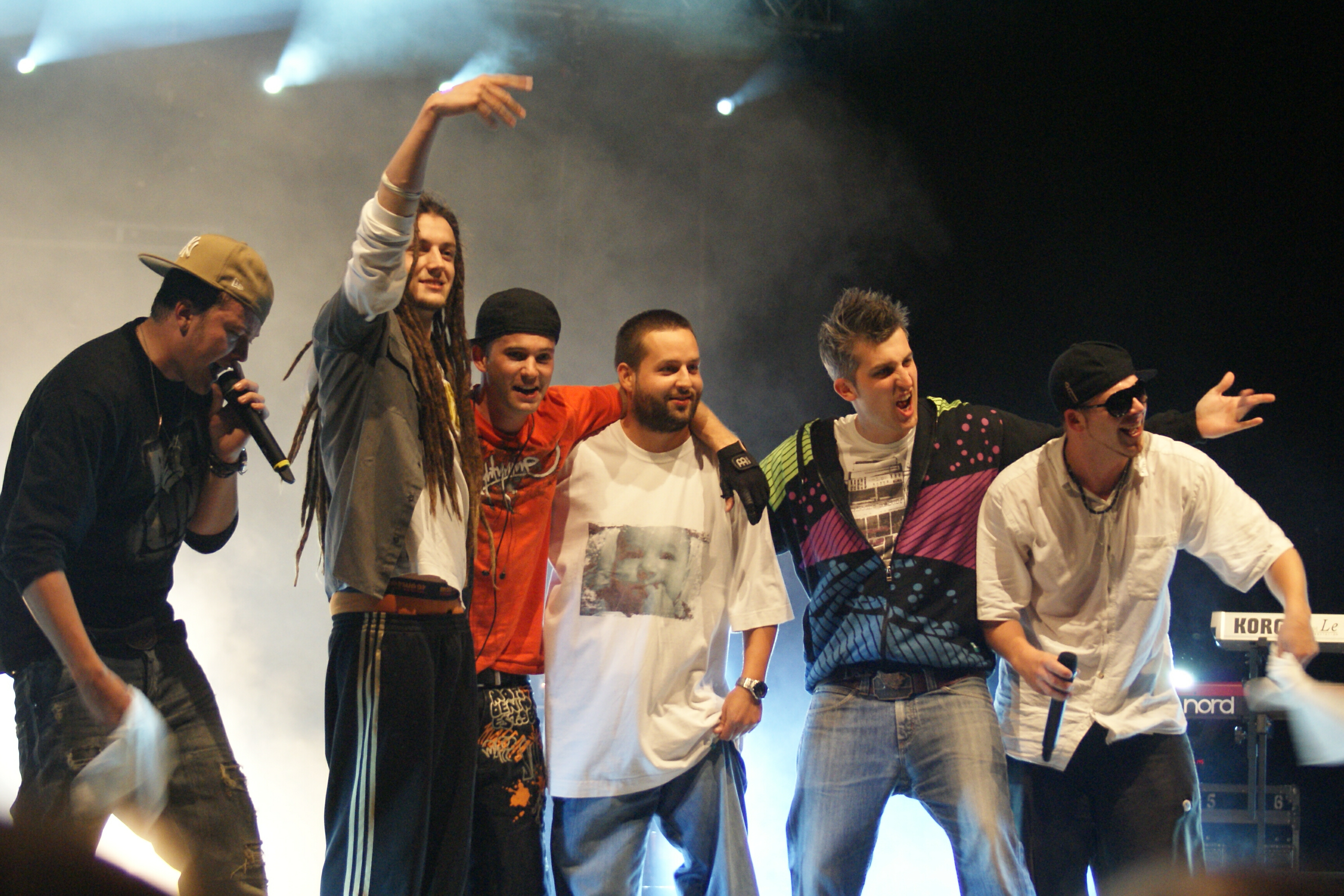
Tomson & Baron

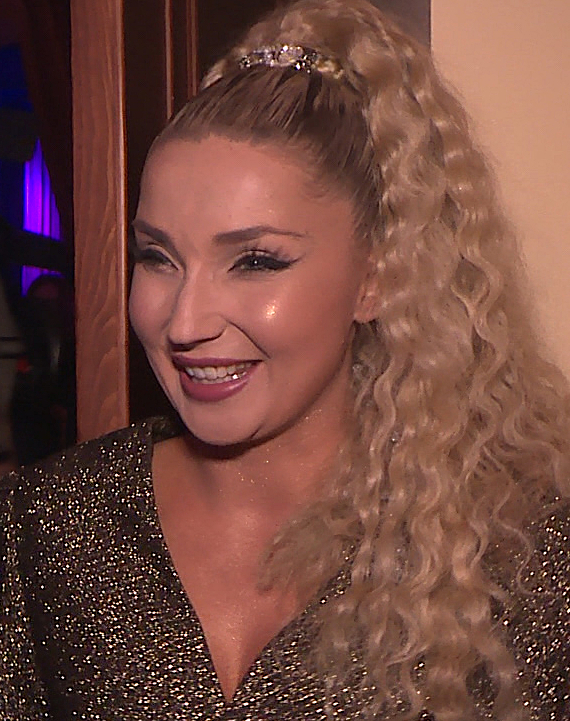
Cleo

== Teams ==
Colour key

- Winner
- Runner-up
- Third Place
- Winner of the online plebiscite
- Eliminated in the Final
- Eliminated in the Sing-offs
- Eliminated in the Battle rounds

Coaches	Top 54 Artists					
Dawid Kwiatkowski						
Dawid Kwiatkowski	Marcin Maciejczak	Anastazja Maciąg	Ala Tracz	Beniamin Nowakowski	Gabriela Coutinho	Oskar Brzostowski
Dawid Kwiatkowski	Estera Kmiecik	Natalia Kosmowska	Karina Kowalska	Iza Podgórska	Emilka Sentkowska	Natalia Topczewska
Dawid Kwiatkowski	Julia Totoszko	Józia Karnkowska	Ola Tracz	Julia Wiśniewska	Gabrysia Zalewska	Bartłomiej Żurek
Tomson & Baron						
Tomson & Baron	Hania Sztachańska	Ola Gwazdacz	Ewelina Kozub	Julia Wincenciak	Konrad Repiński	Liza Misnikova
Tomson & Baron	Fabian Kurtyna	Iga Pawełczak	Kinga Wołoszyn	Kuba Kośmider	Lara Hidane	Mateusz Kłosowski
Tomson & Baron	Milena Alot	Natalia Wawrzyńczyk	Ola Oleszewska	Antoni Szydłowski	Eliza Xerxa	Maya Zyskowska
Cleo						
Cleo	Natalia Kawalec	Wiktoria Zwolińska	Szymon Lubicki	Paweł Madzia	Agnieszka Letniowska	Maya Pilarczyk
Cleo	Cornelia Andrzejak	Dawid Sokołowski	Julia Tłuczkiewicz	Kuba Maliszewski	Martyna Stępień	Olivier Rybicki
Cleo	Ola Kędra	Natalia Smaś	Kamil Marszał	Grześ Stachera	Magda Pająk	Julia Tkacz

== Blind auditions ==
Color key

✔	Coach hit his/her "I WANT YOU" button
	Artist defaulted to this coach's team
	Artist elected to join this coach's team
	Artist eliminated with no coach pressing his or her "I WANT YOU" button

=== Episode 1 (January 1, 2020) ===
The coaches, Roksana Węgiel, Viki Gabor, Anna Dąbrowska, Carla Fernandes, Paweł Szymański, Oliwier Szot, Adam Kubera and current contestants performed "A Million Dreams"

Order	Artist	Age	Song	Coach's and contestant's choices		
Order	Artist	Age	Song	Dawid	Tomson & Baron	Cleo
1	Szymon Lubicki	11	Youngblood	✔	✔	✔
2	Maya Pilarczyk	9	Kiedy Jesteś Tu	✔	✔	✔
3	Natalia Wawrzyńczyk	14	Closer	✔	✔	✔
4	Michał Raduchowski-Brochwicz	13	I Don't Care	—	—	—
5	Iza Podgórska	14	Flashlight	✔	✔	—
6	Estera Kmiecik	15	Wrecking Ball	✔	✔	✔

=== Episode 2 (January 1, 2020) ===
Ania Dąbrowska performed "Do Gwiazd"

Order	Artist	Age	Song	Coach's and contestant's choices		
Order	Artist	Age	Song	Dawid	Tomson & Baron	Cleo
1	Julia Tłuczkiewicz	13	How Will I Know	✔	✔	✔
2	Konrad Repiński	10	Z Poradnika Małego Zielarza	✔	✔	✔
3	Ola Tracz	14	Never Give Up	✔	✔	—
4	Ala Tracz	9	I'll Be There	✔	✔	✔
5	Jakub Cieplak	11	You've Got a Friend in Me	—	—	—
6	Kinga Wołoszyn	13	Sztorm	—	✔	✔

=== Episode 3 (January 4, 2020) ===
Roksana Węgiel performed "Potrafisz"

Order	Artist	Age	Song	Coach's and contestant's choices		
Order	Artist	Age	Song	Dawid	Tomson & Baron	Cleo
1	Jakub Maliszewski	10	Nothing's Gonna Change My Love for You	✔	✔	✔
2	Lara Hidane	13	Rise Up	✔	✔	✔
3	Beniamin Nowakowski	14	Dive	✔	✔	✔
4	Iga Pawełczak	14	Don't Stop the Music	—	✔	—
5	Krystian Gizicki	11	Trofea	—	—	—
6	Paweł Madzia	11	Chwytaj Dzień	—	—	✔

=== Episode 4 (January 4, 2020) ===
Order	Artist	Age	Song	Coach's and contestant's choices		
Order	Artist	Age	Song	Dawid	Tomson & Baron	Cleo
1	Julia Wienieciak	13	If I Ain't Got You	✔	✔	✔
2	Dawid Wojnarowicz	14	Długość Dźwięku Samotności	—	—	—
3	Julia Wiśniewska	14	Flashlight	✔	✔	✔
4	Fabian Kurnyta	14	Don't Stop Me Now	—	✔	—
5	Karina Kowalska	8	Call Me Maybe	✔	—	✔
6	Milena Alot	14	Girl on Fire	✔	✔	✔
7	Marcin Maciejczak	13	I'll Never Love Again	✔	✔	✔

=== Episode 5 (January 11, 2020) ===
Adam Kubera performed "Tak Jak Jest"

Order	Artist	Age	Song	Coach's and contestant's choices		
Order	Artist	Age	Song	Dawid	Tomson & Baron	Cleo
1	Ola Gwazdacz	12	The Best	—	✔	'✔
2	Martyna Stępień	14	Empire State of Mind	—	—	✔
3	Wiktoria Woźniacka	10	Ani Słowa	—	—	—
4	Julia Totoszko	13	Strangers	✔	—	—
5	Dawid Sokołowski	13	Never Say Never	—	—	✔
6	Szymon Łasinski	15	Mercy	—	—	—
7	Gabriela Coutinho	13	Don't You Worry 'bout a Thing	✔	'✔	'✔

=== Episode 6 (January 11, 2020) ===
Order	Artist	Age	Song	Coach's and contestant's choices		
Order	Artist	Age	Song	Dawid	Tomson & Baron	Cleo
1	Cornelia Andrzejak	12	All About That Bass	'✔	—	✔
2	Mateusz Kłosowski	13	Paparazzi	—	✔	—
3	Ola Olszewska	14	No Tears Left to Cry	'✔	✔	'✔
4	Tomek Rychlewski	12	Ściernisco	—	—	—
5	Bartek Żurek	14	Another Love	✔	—	—
6	Jakub Kośmider	12	Wierniejsza od Marzenia	'✔	✔	—
7	Anastazja Maciąg	14	I Was Here	✔	—	'✔

=== Episode 7 (January 18, 2020) ===
Order	Artist	Age	Song	Coach's and contestant's choices		
Order	Artist	Age	Song	Dawid	Tomson & Baron	Cleo
1	Natalia Topczewska	14	Grenade	✔	'✔	'✔
2	Eliza Xerxa	11	Stone Cold	'✔	✔	'✔
3	Michał Siuta	13	Cisza	—	—	—
4	Maya Zyskowska	12	Ta Sama Chwila	'✔	✔	'✔
5	Julia Tkacz	13	Be the One	'✔	—	✔
6	Emilia Sentkowska	14	A Thousand Miles	✔	—	'✔
7	Antoni Szydłowski	13	Hello	'✔	✔	'✔

=== Episode 8 (January 18, 2020) ===
Carla Fernandes performed "Kontury"

Order	Artist	Age	Song	Coach's and contestant's choices		
Order	Artist	Age	Song	Dawid	Tomson & Baron	Cleo
1	Oskar Brzostowski	15	They Don't Know About Us	✔	'✔	'✔
2	Ola Kędra	12	Always Remember Us This Way	'✔	—	✔
3	Lena Małodzińska	9	Anyone I Want to Be	—	—	—
4	Hania Sztachańska	13	Nothing Breaks Like a Heart	—	✔	'✔
5	Kamil Marszał	11	Powiedz Mi To W Twarz	'✔	—	✔
6	Natalia Kawalec	15	All I Ask	'✔	'✔	✔

=== Episode 9 (January 25, 2020) ===
Mateusz Golicki performed "Twój"

Order	Artist	Age	Song	Coach's and contestant's choices		
Order	Artist	Age	Song	Dawid	Tomson & Baron	Cleo
1	Ewelina Kozub	13	Masterpiece	'✔	✔	—
2	Natalia Kosmowska	11	Jak Na Lotni	✔	—	—
3	Olivier Rybicki	11	Can't Stop the Feeling!	—	—	✔
4	Agnieszka Letniowska	14	The Greatest	'✔	'✔	✔
5	Klara Tryboń	9	Motyle i Ćmy	—	—	—
6	Grzegorz Stachera	10	Pamięć	'✔	'✔	✔

=== Episode 10 (January 25, 2020) ===
Order	Artist	Age	Song	Coach's and contestant's choices		
Order	Artist	Age	Song	Dawid	Tomson & Baron	Cleo
1	Gabrysia Zalewska	10	Na Pewno	✔	—	—
2	Lizaveta Misnikova	14	Break Free	—	✔	'✔
3	Józefina Krankowska	11	Chłopiec z Gitarą	✔	'✔	—
4	Klementyna Krankowska	11	Nie Ma Fal	—	—	—
5	Natalia Smaś	11	A Whole New World	'✔	'✔	✔
6	Magda Pająk	13	Euphoria	'✔	'✔	✔
7	Wiktoria Zwolińska	14	Creep	'✔	'✔	✔

== The Battle Rounds ==
Color key

Artist won the Battle and advances to the Sing offs
Artist lost the Battle and was eliminated

=== Episode 11: Team Dawid (February 1, 2020) ===
The Dawid's group performed "This Is Me" at the start of the show.

Episode	Coach	Order	Winner(s)	Song	Losers	
Episode 11 (February 1, 2020)	Dawid Kwiatkowski	1	Oskar Brzostowski	Señorita	Emilia Sentkowska	Bartłomiej Żurek
Episode 11 (February 1, 2020)	Dawid Kwiatkowski	2	Anastazja Maciąg	Miasto	Estera Kmiecik	Gabrysia Zalewska
Episode 11 (February 1, 2020)	Dawid Kwiatkowski	3	Gabriela Coutinho	Tell Me You Love Me	Julia Wiśniewska	Natalia Topczewska
Episode 11 (February 1, 2020)	Dawid Kwiatkowski	4	Beniamin Nowakowski	Imagine	Ola Tracz	Natalia Kosmowska
Episode 11 (February 1, 2020)	Dawid Kwiatkowski	5	Ala Tracz	O Mnie Się Nie Martw	Karina Kowalska	Józia Karnkowska
Episode 11 (February 1, 2020)	Dawid Kwiatkowski	6	Marcin Maciejczak	Into You	Julia Totoszko	Iza Podgórska

Sing offs

Episode	Coach	Order	Artist	Song	Result
Episode 11 (February 1, 2020)	Dawid Kwiatkowski	1	Oskar Brzostowski	They Don't Know About Us	Eliminated
Episode 11 (February 1, 2020)	Dawid Kwiatkowski	2	Anastazja Maciąg	I Was Here	Advanced
Episode 11 (February 1, 2020)	Dawid Kwiatkowski	3	Gabriela Coutinho	Don't You Worry 'bout a Thing	Eliminated
Episode 11 (February 1, 2020)	Dawid Kwiatkowski	4	Beniamin Nowakowski	Dive	Eliminated
Episode 11 (February 1, 2020)	Dawid Kwiatkowski	5	Ala Tracz	I'll Be There	Advanced
Episode 11 (February 1, 2020)	Dawid Kwiatkowski	6	Marcin Maciejczak	I'll Never Love Again	Advanced

=== Episode 12: Team Tomson & Baron (February 8, 2020) ===
The Tomson & Baron's group performed "We Are the World" at the start of the show.

Episode	Coach	Order	Winner(s)	Song	Losers	
Episode 12 (February 8, 2020)	Tomson & Baron	1	Ewelina Kozub	Domino	Ola Oleszewska	Kinga Wołoszyn
Episode 12 (February 8, 2020)	Tomson & Baron	2	Ola Gwazdacz	Wild World	Milena Alot	Fabian Kurtyna
Episode 12 (February 8, 2020)	Tomson & Baron	3	Liza Misnikova	Symphony	Natalia Wawrzyńczyk	Eliza Xerxa
Episode 12 (February 8, 2020)	Tomson & Baron	4	Julia Wincenciak	Do Kiedy Jestem	Maya Zyskowska	Iga Pawełczak
Episode 12 (February 8, 2020)	Tomson & Baron	5	Konrad Repiński	Nie Zadzieraj Nosa	Kuba Kośmider	Mateusz Kłosowski
Episode 12 (February 8, 2020)	Tomson & Baron	6	Hania Sztachańska	Spirit	Antoni Szydłowski	Lara Hidane

Sing offs

Episode	Coach	Order	Artist	Song	Result
Episode 12 (February 8, 2020)	Tomson & Baron	1	Ewelina Kozub	Masterpiece	Advanced
Episode 12 (February 8, 2020)	Tomson & Baron	2	Ola Gwazdacz	The Best	Advanced
Episode 12 (February 8, 2020)	Tomson & Baron	3	Liza Misnikova	Break Free	Eliminated
Episode 12 (February 8, 2020)	Tomson & Baron	4	Julia Wincenciak	If I Ain't Got You	Eliminated
Episode 12 (February 8, 2020)	Tomson & Baron	5	Konrad Repiński	Z Poradnika Małego Zielarza	Eliminated
Episode 12 (February 8, 2020)	Tomson & Baron	6	Hania Sztachańska	Nothing Breaks Like a Heart	Advanced

=== Episode 13: Team Cleo (February 15, 2020) ===
The Cleo's group performed "Za Krokiem Krok" at the start of the show.

Episode	Coach	Order	Winner(s)	Song	Losers	
Episode 13 (February 15, 2020)	Cleo	1	Paweł Madzia	Jak Nie My To Kto	Olivier Rybicki	Grześ Stachera
Episode 13 (February 15, 2020)	Cleo	2	Agnieszka Letniowska	Diamonds	Martyna Stępień	Ola Kędra
Episode 13 (February 15, 2020)	Cleo	3	Szymon Lubicki	Get Down (You're the One for Me)	Dawid Sokołowski	Kamil Marszał
Episode 13 (February 15, 2020)	Cleo	4	Wiktoria Zwolińska	At Last	Magda Pająk	Cornelia Andrzejak
Episode 13 (February 15, 2020)	Cleo	5	Maya Pilarczyk	Konik Na Biegunach	Kuba Maliszewski	Natalia Smaś
Episode 13 (February 15, 2020)	Cleo	6	Natalia Kawalec	Rolling in the Deep	Julia Tkacz	Julia Tłuczkiewicz

Sing offs

Episode	Coach	Order	Artist	Song	Result
Episode 13 (February 15, 2020)	Cleo	1	Paweł Madzia	Chwytaj Dzień	Eliminated
Episode 13 (February 15, 2020)	Cleo	2	Agnieszka Letniowska	The Greatest	Eliminated
Episode 13 (February 15, 2020)	Cleo	3	Szymon Lubicki	Youngblood	Advanced
Episode 13 (February 15, 2020)	Cleo	4	Wiktoria Zwolińska	Creep	Advanced
Episode 13 (February 15, 2020)	Cleo	5	Maya Pilarczyk	Kiedy Jesteś Tu	Eliminated
Episode 13 (February 15, 2020)	Cleo	6	Natalia Kawalec	All I Ask	Advanced

== Episode 14 Finale (22 February) ==
Color key

Artist was chosen by his/her coach
Artist was eliminated by his/her coach

=== Round 1 ===
Order	Coach	Artist	Song	Result
1	Tomson & Baron	Hania Sztachańska	This World	Tomson & Baron Choice
2	Tomson & Baron	Ewelina Kozub	Ewakuacja	Eliminated
3	Tomson & Baron	Ola Gwazdacz	Waka Waka (This Time for Africa)	Eliminated
1	Cleo	Natalia Kawalec	Dziwny Jest Ten Świat	Cleo's Choice
2	Cleo	Szymon Lubicki	Just the Way You Are	Eliminated
3	Cleo	Wiktoria Zwolińska	Nothing Else Matters	Eliminated
1	Dawid Kwiatkowski	Anastazja Maciąg	Jestem Kamieniem	Eliminated
2	Dawid Kwiatkowski	Ala Tracz	I Have Nothing	Eliminated
3	Dawid Kwiatkowski	Marcin Maciejczak	Rise Like a Phoenix	Dawid's Choice

=== Round 2 ===
Each contestant performed a duet with their judge, a cover and their original song.

Coach	Artist	Order	Duet song	Order	Cover	Order	Original song	Result
Tomson & Baron	Hania Szachtańska	1	Odpowiedz	4	Crazy	7	Czarno-Biały Film	Third Place
Cleo	Natalia Kawalec	2	Sztorm	5	Always Remember Us This Way	8	Pozwól	Runner-Up
Dawid Kwiatkowski	Marcin Maciejczak	3	Plan B	6	Zawsze Tam Gdzie Ty	9	Jak Gdyby Nic	Winner

== Elimination chart ==
Colour key
Artist's info

- Artist from Team Tomson & Baron
- Artist from Team Dawid Kwiatkowski
- Artist from Team Cleo

Result details

- Winner
- Runner-up
- Third Place
- Artist was saved by the public
- Artist was saved by his/her coach
- Artist was eliminated by his/her coach

Sing-offs and Live show results per week
Artist	The Sing-offs			Live shows	
Artist	Episode 11	Episode 12	Episode 13	Finals	
Artist	Episode 11	Episode 12	Episode 13	Round 1	Round 2
Marcin Maciejczak	Safe	—N/a		Safe	Winner
Natalia Kawalec	—N/a		Safe	Safe	Runner-up
Hania Szachtańska	—N/a	Safe	—N/a	Safe	Third Place
Wiktoria Zwolińska	—N/a		Safe	Eliminated (Finals)	—N/a
Szymon Lubicki	—N/a		Safe	Eliminated (Finals)	—N/a
Ewelina Kozub	—N/a	Safe	—N/a	Eliminated (Finals)	—N/a
Ola Gwazdacz	—N/a	Safe	—N/a	Eliminated (Finals)	—N/a
Ala Tracz	Safe	—N/a		Eliminated (Finals)	—N/a
Anastazja Maciąg	Safe	—N/a		Eliminated (Finals)	—N/a
Paweł Madzia	—N/a		Eliminated (week 3)	—N/a	
Agnieszka Letniowska	—N/a		Eliminated (week 3)	—N/a	
Maya Pilarczyk	—N/a		Eliminated (week 3)	—N/a	
Liza Misnikova	—N/a	Eliminated (week 2)	—N/a		
Julia Wincenciak	—N/a	Eliminated (week 2)	—N/a		
Konrad Repiński	—N/a	Eliminated (week 2)	—N/a		
Gabriela Coutinho	Eliminated (week 1)	—N/a			
Oskar Brzostowski	Eliminated (week 1)	—N/a			
Beniamin Nowakowski	Eliminated (week 1)	—N/a			

=== Teams ===
Color key
Artist's info

- Team Dawid
- Team Cleo
- Team Tomson & Baron

Results details

- Winner
- Runner-up
- Third Place
- Eliminated

Artist	Battles	Sing Offs	Finale Part 1	Finale Part 2
Maciej Maciejczak	Coach's choice	Coach's choice	Coach's choice	Winner
Ala Tracz	Coach's choice	Coach's choice	Eliminated	
Anastazja Maciąg	Coach's choice	Coach's choice	Eliminated	
Gabriela Coutinho	Coach's choice	Eliminated		
Oskar Brzostowski	Coach's choice	Eliminated		
Beniamin Nowakowski	Coach's choice	Eliminated		
Natalia Kawalec	Coach's choice	Coach's choice	Coach's choice	Runner-up
Wiktoria Zwolińska	Coach's choice	Coach's choice	Eliminated	
Szymon Lubicki	Coach's choice	Coach's choice	Eliminated	
Paweł Madzia	Coach's choice	Eliminated		
Maya Pilarczyk	Coach's choice	Eliminated		
Agnieszka Letniowska	Coach's choice	Eliminated		
Hania Szachtańska	Coach's choice	Coach's choice	Coach's choice	Third Place
Ola Gwazdacz	Coach's choice	Coach's choice	Eliminated	
Ewelina Kozub	Coach's choice	Coach's choice	Eliminated	
Liza Misnikova	Coach's choice	Eliminated		
Julia Wincenciak	Coach's choice	Eliminated		
Konrad Repiński	Coach's choice	Eliminated		
