= Russia in the Junior Eurovision Song Contest 2020 =

- Junior Eurovision Song Contest 2020
- Country: Russia
- Selection process: Akademiya Eurovision 2020
- Selection date: 25 September 2020

Competing entry
- Song: "Moy novy den (My New Day)"
- Artist: Sofia Feskova
- Songwriters: Sofia Feskova; Anna Petryasheva; Vitaly Tomin

Placement
- Final result: 10th, 88 points

Participation chronology

Russia was represented at the Junior Eurovision Song Contest 2020 which took place on 29 November 2020, in Warsaw, Poland. The Russian broadcaster All-Russia State Television and Radio Broadcasting Company (VGTRK) was responsible for organising their entry for the contest. Sofia Feskova won the national final on 25 September 2020 with the song "Moy novy den". The representative of Russia in 2020, Sofia Feskova, placed 10th place with 88 points.

== Background ==
Prior to the 2020 contest, Russia had participated in the Junior Eurovision Song Contest 15 times since its debut in 2005. Russia has won the contest twice: in 2006 with the song "Vesenniy jazz" performed by the Tolmachevy Twins, and in 2017 with the song "Wings" performed by Polina Bogusevich. In the 2019 contest, Russia was represented by the song "A Time for Us" performed by Tatyana Mezhentseva and Denberel Oorzhak. The song placed 13th in a field of 19 countries with 72 points.

== Before Junior Eurovision ==
=== Akademiya Eurovision 2020 ===
The Russian broadcaster, VGTRK, announced on 2 April 2020 that they would be participating in the 2020 contest. Submissions for entrants were open between 6 April to 25 August, with the audition stage taking place in the Russian capital, Moscow, in September 2020. VGTRK announced on 15 September that a total of eleven artists would be competing in the national final. The national selection of the entrant for Russia took place on 25 September 2020, and was televised a day later on 26 September. The winner was determined by a voting split of 50% jury members and 50% internet voting which opened on 16 September and closed on 24 September. Sofia Feskova won the national final with the song "Moy novy den".

Final
Draw	Artist	Song	Jury	Online vote	Total	Place
1	Sophia Tumanova	"Bolshe sveta" (Больше света)	28	8	36	11
2	Sergey Filin & Veronica Litovchenko	"V trendakh TikTok" (В трендах TikTok)	34	20	54	7
3	Sofia Feskova	"Moy novy den" (Мой новый день)	57	77	134	1
4	Genych	"Nastroyeniye Panda" (Настроение Панда)	28	12	40	9
5	Artem Morozov	"Leti" (Лети)	76	10	86	4
6	Sofia Kirsenko	"Prosto zhit" (Просто жить)	13	60	73	5
7	Rutger Garecht	"Doroga – moya sudba" (Дорога - моя судьба)	48	80	128	2
8	LittleZ	"Pervaya lyubov" (Первая любовь)	16	51	67	6
9	Sofia Shkepu	"Alise" (Алиса)	47	63	110	3
10	Artem Fokin	"Vozmi moyu ruku" (Возьми мою руку)	28	16	44	8
11	Arseny Slesarev	"Chto ty nadelala, baby?" (Что ты наделала)	30	10	40	9

== Artist and song information ==
Sofia Feskova
- Born: 5 September 2009 (age 16)
- Genres: Pop
- Occupation: Singer
- Instrument: Vocals
- Years active: 2016 – present

(Russia) "Moy novy den (My New Day)"

Junior Eurovision Song Contest 2020 entry
- Country: Russia
- Artist: Sofia Feskova
- Languages: Russian, English
- Lyricists: Sofia Feskova; Anna Petryasheva; Vitaly Tomin

Entry chronology
- ◄ "A Time for Us" (2019)
- "Mon Ami" (2021) ►

=== Sofia Feskova ===
Sofia Feskova (Russian: София Феськова; born 5 September 2009) is a Russian singer from St. Petersburg. She represented Russia at the Junior Eurovision Song Contest 2020 with the song "Moy novyy den".

=== Moy novy den (My New Day) ===
"Moy novy den" (Russian: Мой новый день; English: "My New Day") is a song by Russian singer Sofia Feskova. It represented Russia at the Junior Eurovision Song Contest 2020.

== At Junior Eurovision ==
After the opening ceremony, which took place on 23 November, it was announced that Russia will perform ninth during the final, following Malta and preceding Spain. The contest was broadcast live from Warsaw, Poland, on 29 November 2020.

=== Performance ===
Feskova's performance featured augmented reality, with "bright pictures from magical dreams" on the LED screen.

Sofia was wearing a blue dress that has been specifically created for the competition. Sofia was alone on stage for her performance.

=== Voting ===
The same voting system that was introduced in the 2017 edition was used, where the results were determined by 50% online voting and 50% jury voting. Every participating broadcaster assembled a national jury that consisted of three music industry professionals and two children aged between 10 and 15 who were citizens of the country they represented. The rankings of those jurors were combined to make an overall top ten.

The online voting consisted of two phases. The first phase of the online voting began on 27 November 2020 when a recap of all the rehearsal performances was shown on the contest's website Junioreurovision.tv before the viewers could vote. After this, voters also had the option to watch longer one-minute clips from each participant's rehearsal. This first round of voting ended on 29 November at 15:59 CET. The second phase of the online voting took place during the live show and began right after the last performance and was open for 15 minutes. International viewers were able to vote for three songs. They were also able to vote for their own country's song. These votes were then turned into points which were determined by the percentage of votes received. For example, if a song received 10% of the votes, it received 10% of the available points.

Points awarded to Russia
Score	Country
12 points	
10 points	France
8 points	Belarus
7 points	
6 points	Germany
5 points	
4 points	Kazakhstan; Poland
3 points	Malta; Netherlands; Spain; Ukraine
2 points	
1 point	
Russia received 44 points from the online vote

Points awarded by Russia
Score	Country
12 points	Kazakhstan
10 points	Ukraine
8 points	France
7 points	Georgia
6 points	Belarus
5 points	Spain
4 points	Poland
3 points	Serbia
2 points	Netherlands
1 point	Malta

==== Detailed voting results ====
The following members comprised the Russian jury:

- Lena Katina – represented Russia in the Eurovision Song Contest 2003 as part of t.A.T.u.
- Philipp Kirkorov – represented Russia in the Eurovision Song Contest 1995
- Yulia Savicheva – represented Russia in the Eurovision Song Contest 2004

Detailed voting results from Russia
Draw	Country	Juror A	Juror B	Juror C	Juror D	Juror E	Rank	Points
01	Germany	9	9	11	11	10	11	
02	Kazakhstan	2	3	1	1	1	1	12
03	Netherlands	6	8	9	8	7	9	2
04	Serbia	8	4	5	10	9	8	3
05	Belarus	3	1	6	9	8	5	6
06	Poland	5	6	7	7	6	7	4
07	Georgia	1	10	8	2	5	4	7
08	Malta	11	7	10	5	11	10	1
09	Russia							
10	Spain	10	5	3	6	3	6	5
11	Ukraine	7	2	4	3	4	2	10
12	France	4	11	2	4	2	3	8
