= Germany in the Junior Eurovision Song Contest 2020 =

- Junior Eurovision Song Contest 2020
- Country: Germany
- Selection process: Dein Song für Warschau
- Selection date: 2 September 2020

Competing entry
- Song: "Stronger with You"
- Artist: Susan Oseloff
- Songwriters: Levent Geiger

Placement
- Final result: 12th, 66 points

Participation chronology

Germany debuted in the Junior Eurovision Song Contest 2020 which was held on 29 November 2020 in Warsaw, Poland. German broadcasters ARD and ZDF selected Susan Oseloff to represent the country with the song "Stronger with You" through the televised selection process Dein Song für Warschau. She finished in 12th position (last place) with 66 points.

== Before Junior Eurovision ==
=== Dein Song für Warschau ===
On 8 July 2020, Kika confirmed that a delegation from broadcasters NDR and ZDF will participate for the first time in the 2020 contest in Warsaw. For the nation's first participation, the broadcasters selected their artist through the national selection process Dein Song für Warschau (English: Your Song for Warsaw), with the song selected internally.

Kika opened the application window for the national selection show on 8 July until 31 July for children of age 9 to 14. Of the 70 applicants, five finalists were selected: Davit Müller, Susan Oseloff, Leroy Schmidt, Linnea Schneider and Malaika Fischer. The finalists each performed two original songs by Levent Geiger: "See You Later" and "Stronger with You". The jury members of the show, who decided the winner, were Max Mutzke, Levent Geiger, Michelle Huesmann, and Martin Haas. The show aired on 1 and 2 September, and on the second day Susan Oseloff was revealed as the winner with the song "Stronger with You".

== Artist and song information ==
(Germany) "Stronger with You"

Junior Eurovision Song Contest 2020 entry
- Country: Germany
- Artist(s): Susan Oseloff
- Languages: German, English
- Lyricist(s): Levent Geiger

Finals performance
- Final result: 12th
- Final points: 66
- "Imagine Us" (2021) ►

=== Susan Oseloff ===
Susan Oseloff (born 30 November 2006), is a German singer, who represented Germany in the Junior Eurovision Song Contest 2020.

=== Stronger with You ===
"Stronger with You" is the debut single by German singer Susan Oseloff. It represented Germany at the Junior Eurovision Song Contest 2020. The verses of the song are in German, while the chorus is in English.

== At Junior Eurovision ==
During the opening ceremony and the running order draw, which both took place on 23 November 2020, Germany was drawn to perform first on 29 November 2020, preceding Kazakhstan.

=== Voting ===
The same voting system that was introduced in the 2017 edition was used, where the results were determined by 50% online voting and 50% jury voting. Every participating broadcaster assembled a national jury that consisted of three music industry professionals and two children aged between 10 and 15 who were citizens of the country they represented. The rankings of those jurors were combined to make an overall top ten.

The online voting consisted of two phases. The first phase of the online voting began on 27 November 2020 when a recap of all the rehearsal performances was shown on the contest's website Junioreurovision.tv before the viewers could vote. After this, voters also had the option to watch longer one-minute clips from each participant's rehearsal. This first round of voting ended on 29 November at 15:59 CET. The second phase of the online voting took place during the live show and began right after the last performance and was open for 15 minutes. International viewers were able vote for three songs. They were also able to vote for their own country's song. These votes were then turned into points which were determined by the percentage of votes received. For example, if a song received 10% of the votes, it received 10% of the available points.

Points awarded to Germany
Score	Country
12 points	
10 points	
8 points	
7 points	
6 points	France
5 points	Kazakhstan; Malta
4 points	
3 points	Belarus
2 points	Georgia; Poland; Serbia; Ukraine
1 point	
Germany received 39 points from the online vote

Points awarded by Germany
Score	Country
12 points	Netherlands
10 points	Spain
8 points	France
7 points	Belarus
6 points	Russia
5 points	Georgia
4 points	Ukraine
3 points	Kazakhstan
2 points	Poland
1 point	Malta

==== Detailed voting results ====
Detailed voting results from Germany
Draw	Country	Juror A	Juror B	Juror C	Juror D	Juror E	Rank	Points
01	Germany							
02	Kazakhstan	2	5	5	9	11	8	3
03	Netherlands	5	1	6	1	2	1	12
04	Serbia	10	10	10	11	10	11	
05	Belarus	6	8	2	2	8	4	7
06	Poland	4	7	9	10	6	9	2
07	Georgia	1	6	8	7	7	6	5
08	Malta	11	4	11	8	5	10	1
09	Russia	9	3	3	4	9	5	6
10	Spain	3	11	1	3	4	2	10
11	Ukraine	8	9	4	5	3	7	4
12	France	7	2	7	6	1	3	8
