= Malta in the Junior Eurovision Song Contest 2020 =

- Junior Eurovision Song Contest 2020
- Country: Malta
- Selection process: Malta Junior Eurovision Song Contest 2020
- Selection date: 1 October 2020

Competing entry
- Song: "Chasing Sunsets"
- Artist: Chanel Monseigneur
- Songwriters: Peter Borg; Aleandro Spiteri Monseigneur; Joe Roscoe; Emil Calleja Bayliss

Placement
- Final result: 8th, 100 points

Participation chronology

Malta was represented at the Junior Eurovision Song Contest 2020, held in Warsaw, Poland. Maltese broadcaster Public Broadcasting Services (PBS) was responsible for the country's participation in the contest, and organised a national final to select the Maltese entry. Malta was represented in the contest by the song "Chasing Sunsets", written by Peter Borg, Aleandro Spiteri Monseigneur, Joe Roscoe and Emil Calleja Bayliss, and performed by Chanel Monseigneur. She achieved 8th place with 100 points.

== Background ==
Prior to the 2020 contest, Malta had participated in the Junior Eurovision Song Contest fifteen times since their first participation in the inaugural 2003 contest. Malta had participated in every contest with the exception of the 2011 and 2012 contests. Malta has won the contest twice: in 2013 with "The Start" performed by Gaia Cauchi, and in 2015 with "Not My Soul" performed by Destiny Chukunyere. In the 2019 contest, Malta was represented by the song "We Are More" performed by Eliana Gomez Blanco. The song placed last out of 19 entries with 29 points.

== Before Junior Eurovision ==
=== Malta Junior Eurovision Song Contest 2020 ===
Malta's participation in the contest was confirmed in July 2020. PBS organised the national final Malta Junior Eurovision Song Contest 2020 to select the Maltese entry.

==== Competing entries ====
Artists and songwriters were able to submit their entries between 22 July and 23 August 2020, and the competing entries were announced on 31 August 2020. The songs were broadcast on 19 September 2020, and the show was hosted by Amber Bondin and Dorian Casar. After the show, an online vote was open until 26 September 2020. The winner was revealed on 1 October 2020. Gianluca Cilla had previously represented Malta in 2017.

| Artist | Song | Songwriter(s) |
|---|---|---|
| Anneka Xerri | "Moving" | Marco Debono, Rita Pace |
| Chanel Monseigneur | "Chasing Sunsets" | Peter Borg, Aleandro Spiteri Monseigneur, Joe Roscoe, Emil Calleja Bayliss |
| Emma Cutajar | "Modern-Day Cinderella" | Kaya, Gerard James Borg |
| Isaac Tom | "Beside Me" | Isaac Tom, Emil Calleja Bayliss |
| Kaya Gouder Curmi | "Made of Stars" | Gillian Attard, Matthew Muxu Mercieca |
| Leah Cauchi | "Anġli" | Cyprian Cassar, Emil Calleja Bayliss |
| Leah Mifsud | "Anywhere" | Aidan Cassar |
| Mariah Cefai | "Change the Silence" | Gillian Attard, Matthew Muxu Mercieca |
| Michela Caruana | "Replay" | Cyprian Cassar, Matthew Muxu Mercieca |
| Mychael Bartolo Chircop | "The Child From Inside" | Kaya, Yaron Malachi Sharon |
| Yulan Law & Gianluca Cilia | "Deck of Cards" | Philip Vella, Emil Calleja Bayliss |
| Zaira Mifsud & Eksenia Sammut | "Only Live Once" | Cyprian Cassar, Emil Calleja Bayliss |

==== Final ====
The songs were presented on 19 September 2020 at 18:15 CET. The running order was announced on 3 September 2020. The presentation consisted of pre-recorded performances of the twelve competing songs, and the winner was selected by an equal combination of jury votes and online votes from the public. The jury members in the final were: Eliana Gomez Blanco (singer, represented Malta in the Junior Eurovision Song Contest 2019), Michela Pace (singer, represented Malta in the Eurovision Song Contest 2019) and Dominic Cini (singer, composer).

Final – 1 October 2020
| Draw | Artist | Song | Place |
|---|---|---|---|
| 1 | Leah Cauchi | "Anġli" | — |
| 2 | Michela Caruana | "Replay" | — |
| 3 | Emma Cutajar | "Modern-Day Cinderella" | — |
| 4 | Mariah Cefai | "Change the Silence" | — |
| 5 | Chanel Monseigneur | "Chasing Sunsets" | 1 |
| 6 | Anneka Xerri | "Moving" | — |
| 7 | Mychael Bartolo Chircop | "The Child From Inside" | 3 |
| 8 | Yulan Law & Gianluca Cilia | "Deck of Cards" | — |
| 9 | Leah Mifsud | "Anywhere" | 2 |
| 10 | Kaya Gouder Curmi | "Made of Stars" | — |
| 11 | Isaac Tom | "Beside Me" | — |
| 12 | Zaira Mifsud & Eksenia Sammut | "Only Live Once" | — |

== Artist and song information ==
Chanel Monseigneur
- Born: 2 January 2011 (age 15)
- Origin: Mosta, Malta
- Genres: Pop
- Occupation: Singer
- Instruments: vocals, piano
- Years active: 2017–present

(Malta) "Chasing Sunsets"

Junior Eurovision Song Contest 2020 entry
- Country: Malta
- Artist: Chanel Monseigneur
- Languages: English
- Composers: Aleandro Spiteri Monseigneur; Peter Borg; Joe Roscoe
- Lyricist: Emil Calleja Bayliss

Entry chronology
- ◄ "We Are More" (2019)
- "My Home" (2021) ►

=== Chanel Monseigneur ===
Chanel Monseigneur (born 2 January 2011) is a Maltese singer. She represented Malta at the Junior Eurovision Song Contest 2020 with the song "Chasing Sunsets".

=== Chasing Sunsets ===
"Chasing Sunsets" is a song by Maltese singer Chanel Monseigneur. It represented Malta at the Junior Eurovision Song Contest 2020.

== At Junior Eurovision ==
After the opening ceremony, which took place on 23 November 2020, it was announced that Malta would perform in eighth position in the final, following Georgia and preceding Russia.

=== Performance ===
Chanel Monseigneur was accompanied with a cartoon video during her performance.

=== Voting ===
The same voting system that was introduced in the 2017 edition was used, where the results were determined by 50% online voting and 50% jury voting. Every participating broadcaster assembled a national jury that consisted of three music industry professionals and two children aged between 10 and 15 who were citizens of the country they represented. The rankings of those jurors were combined to make an overall top ten.

The online voting consisted of two phases. The first phase of the online voting began on 27 November 2020 when a recap of all the rehearsal performances was shown on the contest's website Junioreurovision.tv before the viewers could vote. After this, voters also had the option to watch longer one-minute clips from each participant's rehearsal. This first round of voting ended on 29 November at 15:59 CET. The second phase of the online voting took place during the live show and began right after the last performance and was open for 15 minutes. International viewers were able to vote for three songs. They were also able to vote for their own country's song. These votes were then turned into points which were determined by the percentage of votes received. For example, if a song received 10% of the votes, it received 10% of the available points.

Points awarded to Malta
| Score | Country |
|---|---|
| 12 points | |
| 10 points | Georgia |
| 8 points | France |
| 7 points | Netherlands; Spain |
| 6 points | Belarus; Poland |
| 5 points | |
| 4 points | Ukraine |
| 3 points | |
| 2 points | |
| 1 point | Germany; Russia; Serbia |
Malta received 49 points from the online vote

Points awarded by Malta
| Score | Country |
|---|---|
| 12 points | France |
| 10 points | Kazakhstan |
| 8 points | Poland |
| 7 points | Belarus |
| 6 points | Netherlands |
| 5 points | Germany |
| 4 points | Spain |
| 3 points | Russia |
| 2 points | Serbia |
| 1 point | Georgia |

==== Detailed voting results ====
Every participating country had national jury that consisted of three music industry professionals and two kids aged between 10 and 15 who were citizens of the country they represented. The rankings of those jurors were combined to make an overall top ten.

Detailed voting results from Malta
| Draw | Country | Juror A | Juror B | Juror C | Juror D | Juror E | Rank | Points |
|---|---|---|---|---|---|---|---|---|
| 01 | Germany | 10 | 6 | 7 | 6 | 6 | 6 | 5 |
| 02 | Kazakhstan | 1 | 2 | 3 | 2 | 2 | 2 | 10 |
| 03 | Netherlands | 5 | 4 | 2 | 5 | 8 | 5 | 6 |
| 04 | Serbia | 8 | 7 | 8 | 9 | 10 | 9 | 2 |
| 05 | Belarus | 3 | 3 | 4 | 7 | 3 | 4 | 7 |
| 06 | Poland | 6 | 5 | 5 | 3 | 1 | 3 | 8 |
| 07 | Georgia | 11 | 11 | 10 | 8 | 5 | 10 | 1 |
| 08 | Malta | | | | | | | |
| 09 | Russia | 7 | 8 | 9 | 4 | 9 | 8 | 3 |
| 10 | Spain | 4 | 10 | 6 | 11 | 7 | 7 | 4 |
| 11 | Ukraine | 9 | 9 | 11 | 10 | 11 | 11 | |
| 12 | France | 2 | 1 | 1 | 1 | 4 | 1 | 12 |
