= Georgia in the Junior Eurovision Song Contest 2020 =

- Junior Eurovision Song Contest 2020
- Country: Georgia
- Selection process: Artist: Ranina; Song: Internal Selection
- Selection date: 13 November 2020

Competing entry
- Song: "You Are Not Alone"
- Artist: Sandra Gadelia
- Songwriters: Giga Kukhianidze; Temo Sajaia

Placement
- Final result: 6th, 111 points

Participation chronology

Georgia was represented at the Junior Eurovision Song Contest 2020, which was held in Warsaw, Poland on 29 November 2020. Sandra Gadelia was selected through the televised show Ranina. She achieved 6th place with 111 points.

== Background ==
Prior to the 2020 contest, Georgia had participated in the Junior Eurovision Song Contest twelve times since its debut in 2007, and since then they have never missed a single contest. Georgia is also the most successful country in the competition, with three victories in 2008, 2011 and 2016. In the 2019 contest, Giorgi Rostiashvili carried the Georgian flag to Gliwice Arena's stage with We Need Love following his victory in the second season of Ranina, achieving just the 14th place out of 19 with 69 points.

== Before Junior Eurovision ==
=== Ranina ===
For the third year in a row, Georgia will use an original children's talent show format, Ranina (Georgian: რანინა), as the selection method for their artist. The third season was originally planned to be around two months long starting in late March. However, the COVID-19 pandemic caused the show to be suspended indefinitely. On 13 July 2020, public broadcaster GPB released a new advertising spot for Ranina confirming its return, with recordings due to commence in the following weeks and a revamped format to adjust to the shorter time available. On 18 August 2020, GPB released footage of the first five rehearsals on Facebook and announced that the first show would be premiered on 4 September 2020 at 22:00 Georgian time — though all references to that were deleted a day later. Classical pianist David Aladashvili will continue as the main host of the show, this time joined by Lika Evgenidze as co-host. A new advertisement was released three days later, on 21 August 2020, postponing the season premiere for a week to 11 September 2020.

==== Contestants ====
Contestant	Age (Note: As of 2 March 2020, the day when the list of contestants was released by GPB.)	Final place	Episode of elimination
Sandra Gadelia სანდრა გადელია	9 years old	Winner	N/A
Marita Khvedelidze მარიტა ხვედელიძე	11 years old	Runner-up	Grand Finale
Rati Gelovani რატი გელოვანი	10 years old	3rd place	Grand Finale
Nia Khinchikashvili ნია ხინჩიკაშვილი	12 years old	4th place	After Semi-final
Shio Kavsadze შიო კავსაძე	10 years old	4th place	After Semi-final
Gio Gogiashvili გიო გოგიაშვილი	8 years old	6th place	After Round 4
Veronika Shamugia ვერონიკა შამუგი	12 years old	7th place	After Round 4
Lela Kveniashvili ლელა კვენიაშვილი	12 years old	8th place	After Round 4
Nikoloz Maghradze ნიკოლოზ მაღრაძე	10 years old	8th place	After Round 4
Sesili Turmanidze სესილი თურმანიძე	10 years old	10th place	After Round 4

==== Shows ====
===== Round 1 (11–18 September 2020) =====
The jurors for this round were Elene Kalandadze, Davit Evgenidze and Giorgi Asanishvili.

Show 1 – 11 September 2020
Draw	Artist	Song	Jury scores												Final score
Draw	Artist	Song	D. Evgenidze				E. Kalandadze				G. Asanishvili				Final score
1	Nia Khinchikashvili (with Mebo Nutsubidze)	"Sap'ovnela" (საპოვნელა)	40				40				34				114
1	Nia Khinchikashvili (with Mebo Nutsubidze)	"Sap'ovnela" (საპოვნელა)	10	10	10	10	10	10	10	10	8	8	9	9	114
2	Lela Kveniashvili (with Liza Kalandadze)	"Adamiani" (ადამიანი)	40				40				34				114
2	Lela Kveniashvili (with Liza Kalandadze)	"Adamiani" (ადამიანი)	10	10	10	10	10	10	10	10	9	8	8	9	114
3	Gio Gogiashvili (with Asea Sool)	"Tsitsinatela" (ციცინათელა)	40				40				35				115
3	Gio Gogiashvili (with Asea Sool)	"Tsitsinatela" (ციცინათელა)	10	10	10	10	10	10	10	10	8	8	10	9	115
4	Sesili Turmanidze (with Ialoni)	"P'op'uri" (პოპური)	40				40				34				114
4	Sesili Turmanidze (with Ialoni)	"P'op'uri" (პოპური)	10	10	10	10	10	10	10	10	8	9	9	8	114
5	Rati Gelovani (with Sandro Bibich)	"Mtats'minda" (მთაწმინდა)	40				40				36				116
5	Rati Gelovani (with Sandro Bibich)	"Mtats'minda" (მთაწმინდა)	10	10	10	10	10	10	10	10	10	9	8	9	116

Show 2 – 18 September 2020
Draw	Artist	Song	Jury scores												Final score
Draw	Artist	Song	D. Evgenidze				E. Kalandadze				G. Asanishvili				Final score
6	Marita Khvedelidze (with Nodariko Khutsishvili)	"Mogoneba" (მოგონება)	40				40				35				115
6	Marita Khvedelidze (with Nodariko Khutsishvili)	"Mogoneba" (მოგონება)	10	10	10	10	10	10	10	10	10	8	9	8	115
7	Nikoloz Maghradze (with Nato Metonidze)	"Giorgobis tve" (გიორგობის თვე)	40				40				34				114
7	Nikoloz Maghradze (with Nato Metonidze)	"Giorgobis tve" (გიორგობის თვე)	10	10	10	10	10	10	10	10	8	8	9	9	114
8	Shio Kavsadze (with SALIO)	"Me da ghame" (მე და ღამე)	40				40				34				114
8	Shio Kavsadze (with SALIO)	"Me da ghame" (მე და ღამე)	10	10	10	10	10	10	10	10	8	8	9	9	114
9	Veronika Shamugia (with Kato Kvaratskhelia)	"Alublis rt'o" (ალუბლის რტო)	40				40				34				114
9	Veronika Shamugia (with Kato Kvaratskhelia)	"Alublis rt'o" (ალუბლის რტო)	10	10	10	10	10	10	10	10	9	8	8	9	114
10	Sandra Gadelia (with Lela Nakeuri)	"Khevsuruli nana" (ხევსურული ნანა)	40				40				36				116
10	Sandra Gadelia (with Lela Nakeuri)	"Khevsuruli nana" (ხევსურული ნანა)	10	10	10	10	10	10	10	10	9	9	9	9	116

===== Round 2 (25 September – 2 October 2020) =====
The jurors for this round were Tornike Kipiani, Davit Evgenidze and Tika Balanchine.

Show 3 – 25 September 2020
Draw	Artist	Song	Jury scores												Final score
Draw	Artist	Song	D. Evgenidze				T. Kipiani				T. Balanchine				Final score
1	Lela Kveniashvili	"Golden Slumbers" (The Beatles)	36				36				39				111
1	Lela Kveniashvili	"Golden Slumbers" (The Beatles)	9	9	9	9	10	10	8	8	10	10	9	10	111
2	Gio Gogiashvili	"ABC" (The Jackson 5)	40				40				39				119
2	Gio Gogiashvili	"ABC" (The Jackson 5)	10	10	10	10	10	10	10	10	9	10	10	10	119
3	Sesili Turmanidze	"Fix You" (Coldplay)	40				38				37				115
3	Sesili Turmanidze	"Fix You" (Coldplay)	10	10	10	10	10	9	9	10	9	10	9	9	115
4	Rati Gelovani	"Trouble in Paradise" (Al Jarreau)	40				40				40				120
4	Rati Gelovani	"Trouble in Paradise" (Al Jarreau)	10	10	10	10	10	10	10	10	10	10	10	10	120
5	Nia Khinchikashvili	"Hallelujah I Love Her So" (Ray Charles)	40				40				40				120
5	Nia Khinchikashvili	"Hallelujah I Love Her So" (Ray Charles)	10	10	10	10	10	10	10	10	10	10	10	10	120

Show 4 – 2 October 2020
Draw	Artist	Song	Jury scores												Final score
Draw	Artist	Song	D. Evgenidze				T. Kipiani				T. Balanchine				Final score
6	Shio Kavsadze	"New York State of Mind" (Billy Joel)	40				39				40				119
6	Shio Kavsadze	"New York State of Mind" (Billy Joel)	10	10	10	10	10	10	10	9	10	10	10	10	119
7	Marita Khvedelidze	"Don't You Worry 'Bout A Thing" (Stevie Wonder)	37				40				39				116
7	Marita Khvedelidze	"Don't You Worry 'Bout A Thing" (Stevie Wonder)	10	9	9	9	10	10	10	10	10	10	10	9	116
8	Sandra Gadelia	"Goodbye Yellow Brick Road" (Elton John)	40				40				40				120
8	Sandra Gadelia	"Goodbye Yellow Brick Road" (Elton John)	10	10	10	10	10	10	10	10	10	10	10	10	120
9	Nikoloz Maghradze	"Sunday Morning" (Maroon 5)	38				37				38				113
9	Nikoloz Maghradze	"Sunday Morning" (Maroon 5)	9	9	10	10	10	9	9	9	10	9	10	9	113
10	Veronika Shamugia	"When We Were Young" (Adele)	37				37				39				113
10	Veronika Shamugia	"When We Were Young" (Adele)	10	9	9	9	10	8	10	9	10	10	9	10	113

===== Round 3 (9 – 16 October 2020) =====
The jurors for this round were Archil Ushveridze, Giorgi Mikadze and Maia Mikaberidze.

Show 5 – 9 October 2020
Draw	Artist	Song	Jury scores												Final score
Draw	Artist	Song	A. Ushveridze				G. Mikadze				M. Mikaberidze				Final score
1	Nia Khinchikashvili	"ჭიჭე-ტურა" (Chiche-Tura)	36				40				40				116
1	Nia Khinchikashvili	"ჭიჭე-ტურა" (Chiche-Tura)	9	9	9	9	10	10	10	10	10	10	10	10	116
2	Sesili Turmanidze	"სალუქვაძის ნანა" (Salukvadzis Nana)	39				39				37				115
2	Sesili Turmanidze	"სალუქვაძის ნანა" (Salukvadzis Nana)	10	10	9	10	10	9	10	10	9	9	9	10	115
3	Lela Kveniashvili	"მეგრული სატრფიალო" (Megruli Satrpialo)	37				38				37				112
3	Lela Kveniashvili	"მეგრული სატრფიალო" (Megruli Satrpialo)	9	9	10	9	10	9	10	9	10	9	9	9	112
4	Rati Gelovani	"მე რუსთველი" (Me Rustveli)	40				39				40				119
4	Rati Gelovani	"მე რუსთველი" (Me Rustveli)	10	10	10	10	10	9	10	10	10	10	10	10	119
5	Gio Gogiashvili	"შარატინ" (Sharatin)	40				40				40				120
5	Gio Gogiashvili	"შარატინ" (Sharatin)	10	10	10	10	10	10	10	10	10	10	10	10	120

Show 6 – 16 October 2020
Draw	Artist	Song	Jury scores												Final score
Draw	Artist	Song	A. Ushveridze				G. Mikadze				M. Mikaberidze				Final score
6	Sandra Gadelia	"გაზაფხული" (Gazapkhuli)	40				40				40				120
6	Sandra Gadelia	"გაზაფხული" (Gazapkhuli)	10	10	10	10	10	10	10	10	10	10	10	10	120
7	Nikoloz Maghradze	"დილა" (Dila)	39				39				38				116
7	Nikoloz Maghradze	"დილა" (Dila)	10	10	9	10	10	10	9	10	10	9	9	10	116
8	Shio Kavsadze	"ქართლ-კახური მაყრული" (Kartl-Kakhuri Maqruli)	40				39				39				118
8	Shio Kavsadze	"ქართლ-კახური მაყრული" (Kartl-Kakhuri Maqruli)	10	10	10	10	10	9	10	10	10	9	10	10	118
9	Veronika Shamugia	"ვეენგარა" (Veengara)	40				40				38				118
9	Veronika Shamugia	"ვეენგარა" (Veengara)	10	10	10	10	10	10	10	10	9	9	10	10	118
10	Marita Khvedelidze	"შატილის ასულო" (Shatilis Asulo)	40				40				40				120
10	Marita Khvedelidze	"შატილის ასულო" (Shatilis Asulo)	10	10	10	10	10	10	10	10	10	10	10	10	120

===== Round 4 (23 – 30 October 2020) =====
The jurors for this round were Rusudan Bolkvadze, Eka Mamaladze and Bibi Kvachadze.

Show 7 – 23 October 2020
Draw	Artist	Song	Jury scores												Final score
Draw	Artist	Song	R. Bolkvadze				E. Mamaladze				B. Kvachadze				Final score
1	Sesili Turmanidze	"I Could Have Danced All Night" (Julie Andrews)	38				33				40				111
1	Sesili Turmanidze	"I Could Have Danced All Night" (Julie Andrews)	9	10	10	9	8	8	8	9	10	10	10	10	111
2	Rati Gelovani	"When You Wish Upon A Star" (Cliff Edwards)	39				39				40				118
2	Rati Gelovani	"When You Wish Upon A Star" (Cliff Edwards)	10	10	9	10	10	10	9	10	10	10	10	10	118
3	Nia Khinchikashvili	"Something's Coming" (Jim Bryant)	40				40				40				120
3	Nia Khinchikashvili	"Something's Coming" (Jim Bryant)	10	10	10	10	10	10	10	10	10	10	10	10	120
4	Gio Gogiashvili	"Be Our Guest" (Jerry Orbach & Angela Lansbury)	38				37				38				113
4	Gio Gogiashvili	"Be Our Guest" (Jerry Orbach & Angela Lansbury)	9	9	10	10	8	9	10	10	9	9	10	10	113
5	Lela Kveniashvili	"Don't Rain On My Parade" (Barbra Streisand)	40				39				40				119
5	Lela Kveniashvili	"Don't Rain On My Parade" (Barbra Streisand)	10	10	10	10	10	10	9	10	10	10	10	10	119

Show 8 – 30 October 2020
Draw	Artist	Song	Jury scores												Final score
Draw	Artist	Song	R. Bolkvadze				E. Mamaladze				B. Kvachadze				Final score
6	Marita Khvedelidze	"Journey To The Past" (Liz Callaway)	40				40				39				119
6	Marita Khvedelidze	"Journey To The Past" (Liz Callaway)	10	10	10	10	10	10	10	10	10	9	10	10	119
7	Shio Kavsadze	"A Million Dreams" (Ziv Zaifman, Hugh Jackman & Michelle Williams)	40				39				38				117
7	Shio Kavsadze	"A Million Dreams" (Ziv Zaifman, Hugh Jackman & Michelle Williams)	10	10	10	10	10	10	9	10	10	9	9	10	117
8	Nikoloz Maghradze	"I See The Light" (Mandy Moore & Zachary Levi)	38				37				38				113
8	Nikoloz Maghradze	"I See The Light" (Mandy Moore & Zachary Levi)	10	9	9	10	9	9	9	10	9	9	10	10	113
9	Veronika Shamugia	"Almost There" (Anika Noni Rose)	40				40				40				120
9	Veronika Shamugia	"Almost There" (Anika Noni Rose)	10	10	10	10	10	10	10	10	10	10	10	10	120
10	Sandra Gadelia	"Let It Go" (Idina Menzel)	40				38				39				117
10	Sandra Gadelia	"Let It Go" (Idina Menzel)	10	10	10	10	9	10	9	10	10	9	10	10	117

At the end of Show 8, the semi-finalists were announced. The five participants who collected the most points throughout the four tours advanced to the next round. They are Marita Khvedelidze, Nia Khinchikashvili, Rati Gelovani, Sandra Gadelia, and Shio Kavsadze.

===== Semi-final (6 November 2020) =====
Semi-final – 6 November 2020
Draw	Artist	Song	Result
1	Marita Khvedelidze (with The Quintessence)	"Ach'aruli" (აჭარული)	Finalist
2	Shio Kavsadze (with The Quintessence)	"Shavtvala madina" (შავთვალა მადინა)	Eliminated
3	Sandra Gadelia (with The Quintessence)	"Jeirani" (ჯეირანი)	Finalist
4	Nia Khinchikashvili (with The Quintessence)	"Khevsuruli" (ხევსურული)	Eliminated
5	Rati Gelovani (with The Quintessence)	"Apkhazuri" (აფხაზური)	Finalist

===== Final (13 November 2020) =====
The jurors for the Final were Lana Kutateladze, Davit Evgenidze, and Beka Gochiashvili.

Final (13 November 2020)
Artist	Draw	Song	Draw	Song	Place
Marita Khvedelidze	1	"იები (Violets)" (with The Quintessence)	4	"Simghera maisze" (სიმღერა მაისზე)	2
Sandra Gadelia	2	"ჩემი სიმღერა (My Song)" (with The Quintessence)	5	"Shen gimgheri chemo Tbilis kalako" (შენ გიმღერი ჩემო თბილის ქალაქო)	1
Rati Gelovani	3	"საღამომდე (Day and Night)" (with The Quintessence)	6	"Chemo samshoblo mkhareo" (ჩემო სამშობლო მხარეო)	3

== Artist and song information ==
Sandra Gadelia
- Born: July 2, 2010 (age 14); Tbilisi, Georgia
- Occupation: Singer
- Instrument: Vocals

=== Sandra Gadelia ===
Sandra Gadelia (born 2 July 2010) is a Georgian child singer. She represented Georgia at the Junior Eurovision Song Contest 2020 and announced the Georgian jury points at the final of the Junior Eurovision Song Contest 2021 in Paris, France.

=== You Are Not Alone ===
"You Are Not Alone" is a song performed by Georgian child singer Sandra Gadelia, which represented Georgia in the Junior Eurovision Song Contest 2020.

== At Junior Eurovision ==
After the opening ceremony, which took place on 23 November 2020, it was announced that Georgia would perform in seventh position in the final, following Poland and preceding Malta.

=== Voting ===
The same voting system that was introduced in the 2017 edition was used, where the results were determined by 50% online voting and 50% jury voting. Every participating broadcaster assembled a national jury that consisted of three music industry professionals and two children aged between 10 and 15 who were citizens of the country they represented. The rankings of those jurors were combined to make an overall top ten.

The online voting consisted of two phases. The first phase of the online voting began on 27 November 2020 when a recap of all the rehearsal performances was shown on the contest's website Junioreurovision.tv before the viewers could vote. After this, voters also had the option to watch longer one-minute clips from each participant's rehearsal. This first round of voting ended on 29 November at 15:59 CET. The second phase of the online voting took place during the live show and began right after the last performance and was open for 15 minutes. International viewers were able vote for three songs. They were also able to vote for their own country's song. These votes were then turned into points which were determined by the percentage of votes received. For example, if a song received 10% of the votes, it received 10% of the available points.

During the live show, Georgia received 42 points from online voting, out of 697 total.

Points awarded to Georgia
Score	Country
12 points	Spain; Ukraine
10 points	Kazakhstan
8 points	
7 points	Russia
6 points	Netherlands
5 points	France; Germany; Poland; Serbia
4 points	
3 points	
2 points	
1 point	Belarus; Malta
Georgia received 42 points from the online vote

Points awarded by Georgia
Score	Country
12 points	Kazakhstan
10 points	Malta
8 points	Poland
7 points	Ukraine
6 points	Netherlands
5 points	Serbia
4 points	France
3 points	Belarus
2 points	Germany
1 point	Spain

==== Detailed voting results ====
Every participating country had a national jury that consisted of three music industry professionals and two kids aged between 10 and 15 who were citizens of the country they represented. The rankings of those jurors were combined to make an overall top ten. The results of the Georgian jury were announced during the live show by Marita Khvedelidze, the runner-up of Ranina 2020.

Detailed voting results from Georgia
Draw	Country	Juror A	Juror B	Juror C	Juror D	Juror E	Rank	Points
01	Germany	8	5	10	3	10	9	2
02	Kazakhstan	3	1	1	1	5	1	12
03	Netherlands	4	6	6	8	4	5	6
04	Serbia	1	10	7	9	6	6	5
05	Belarus	10	7	9	2	7	8	3
06	Poland	2	8	8	5	2	3	8
07	Georgia							
08	Malta	5	2	3	6	1	2	10
09	Russia	9	9	11	7	11	11	
10	Spain	11	4	4	11	8	10	1
11	Ukraine	7	11	2	4	3	4	7
12	France	6	3	5	10	9	7	4
