= Netherlands in the Junior Eurovision Song Contest 2020 =

2020 Junior Eurovision participation

- Junior Eurovision Song Contest 2020
- Country: Netherlands
- Selection process: Junior Songfestival 2020
- Selection date: 26 September 2020

Competing entry
- Song: "Best Friends"
- Artist: Unity
- Songwriters: Robert Dorn

Placement
- Final result: 4th, 132 points

Participation chronology

The Netherlands was represented at the Junior Eurovision Song Contest 2020 which was held on 29 November 2020 in Warsaw, Poland. The girl group Unity was selected by AVROTROS to represent the country through the televised national selection Junior Songfestival 2020. They achieved 4th place with 132 points.

== Background ==
Prior to the 2020 contest, the Netherlands had participated in the Junior Eurovision Song Contest seventeen times since its first entry in 2003. The Netherlands have won the contest on one occasion: in 2009 with the song "Click Clack" performed by Ralf Mackenbach. In the 2019 contest, Matheu represented the Netherlands in Gliwice, Poland with the song "Dans met jou". He placed 4th out of 19 entries with 186 points.

== Before Junior Eurovision ==
=== Junior Songfestival 2020 ===
The national selection consisted of one live show, which was held on 26 September 2020. For the first time in its history, the contest was held in Rotterdam Ahoy and without an audience (due to the ongoing COVID-19 pandemic).

==== Competing entries ====
The four acts that were planned to compete in the national final were announced on 29 May. However, before the show, it was announced that Robin and Unity member Demi had tested positive for COVID-19 on the day of the final. Therefore, Robin could not participate and Unity competed without their fourth member. As a consolation, Robin got to make an appearance at Junior Eurovision as the spokesperson for the Dutch jury votes.

Artist	Song	Songwriter(s)	Language(s)	Ref.
~~Robin~~	~~"Mee"~~	~~Adriaan Philipse, Julian Vahle, Maxine van Breukelen~~	~~Dutch~~	
Jackie & Janae	"It's You and Me"	Babette Labeij, Dimitri Veltkamp, Robin van Veen	Dutch, English	
T-Square	"Count On Me"	Jermain van der Bogt, Willem Laseroms	Dutch, English	
Unity	"Best Friends"	Robert Dorn	Dutch, English	

==== Final ====
409,000 viewers watched the final live on NPO 3, the highest since 2017, with a market share of 3.7%.

Final – 26 September 2020
Draw	Artist	Song	Kids jury (Note: The members of the kids jury were Matheu and 6TIMES.)	Jury (Note: The members of the professional jury were Duncan Laurence, Ronnie Flex and Fenna Ramos.)	Televote	Total	Place
1	T-Square	"Count On Me"	9	10	10	29	3
2	Jackie & Janae	"It's You and Me"	12	9	9	30	2
3	Unity	"Best Friends"	10	12	12	34	1

==== Criticism ====
With the release of T-Square's song "Count On Me", accusations of plagiarism of the song "Boy With Luv" by BTS emerged on social media. Due to these accusations, AVROTROS launched a formal investigation with several music experts. As a result of the investigation, AVROTROS responded to the allegations through the Junior Songfestival Instagram account rejecting the allegations, and that the K-Pop sound used in the song is common among international artists. They also said music should be a means to bring people together and not divide them, and that they firmly stand with T-Square regarding the song.

== Artist and song information ==
Unity
- Years active: 2020–present
- Members: Naomi Traa; Demi van den Bos; Maud Noordam; Jayda Monteiro da Silva

(Netherlands) "Best Friends"

Junior Eurovision Song Contest 2020 entry
- Country: Netherlands
- Artist: Unity
- Languages: Dutch, English
- Lyricist: Robert Dorn

Finals performance
- Final result: 4th
- Final points: 132

Entry chronology
- ◄ "Dans met jou" (2019)
- "Mata Sugu Aō Ne" (2021) ►

=== Unity ===
Unity is a Dutch girl group consisting of Naomi, Demi, Maud and Jayda. They represented the Netherlands in the Junior Eurovision Song Contest 2020 with the song "Best Friends".

=== Best Friends ===
"Best Friends" is a song by Unity, written and produced by Robert Dorn. It was released on 16 July 2020, with an acoustic version being released on 6 November. The song contains verses in Dutch and a chorus in English.

== At Junior Eurovision ==
After the opening ceremony, which took place on 23 November 2020, it was announced that the Netherlands would perform in third position in the final, following Kazakhstan and preceding Serbia. In total, 1,056,000 people watched the final live on 26 November 2020.

=== Voting ===
The same voting system that was introduced in the 2017 edition was used, where the results were determined by 50% online voting and 50% jury voting. Every participating broadcaster assembled a national jury that consisted of three music industry professionals and two children aged between 10 and 15 who were citizens of the country they represented. The rankings of those jurors were combined to make an overall top ten.

The online voting consisted of two phases. The first phase of the online voting began on 27 November 2020 when a recap of all the rehearsal performances was shown on the contest's website Junioreurovision.tv before the viewers could vote. After this, voters also had the option to watch longer one-minute clips from each participant's rehearsal. This first round of voting ended on 29 November at 15:59 CET. The second phase of the online voting took place during the live show and began right after the last performance and was open for 15 minutes. International viewers were able to vote for three songs. They were also able to vote for their own country's song. These votes were then turned into points which were determined by the percentage of votes received. For example, if a song received 10% of the votes, it received 10% of the available points.

During the live show, the Netherlands received 64 points from online voting, out of 697 total.

Points awarded to the Netherlands
Score	Country
12 points	Germany
10 points	Spain
8 points	Poland
7 points	Kazakhstan
6 points	Georgia; Malta
5 points	Belarus; Ukraine
4 points	Serbia
3 points	France
2 points	Russia
1 point	
The Netherlands received 64 points from the online vote

Points awarded by the Netherlands
Score	Country
12 points	France
10 points	Spain
8 points	Kazakhstan
7 points	Malta
6 points	Georgia
5 points	Poland
4 points	Serbia
3 points	Russia
2 points	Ukraine
1 point	Belarus

==== Detailed voting results ====
Every participating country had national jury that consisted of three music industry professionals and two kids aged between 10 and 15 who were citizens of the country they represented. The rankings of those jurors were combined to make an overall top ten. The results of the Dutch jury were announced during the liveshow by national finalist Robin de Haas.

Detailed voting results from the Netherlands
Draw	Country	Juror A	Juror B	Juror C	Juror D	Juror E	Rank	Points
01	Germany	10	8	9	10	9	11	
02	Kazakhstan	3	1	2	4	4	3	8
03	Netherlands							
04	Serbia	6	10	6	5	8	7	4
05	Belarus	11	4	11	11	11	10	1
06	Poland	5	5	10	8	5	6	5
07	Georgia	7	6	5	6	3	5	6
08	Malta	4	9	7	2	7	4	7
09	Russia	8	7	4	7	10	8	3
10	Spain	2	2	1	3	2	2	10
11	Ukraine	9	11	8	9	6	9	2
12	France	1	3	3	1	1	1	12
