= Ukraine in the Junior Eurovision Song Contest 2020 =

- Junior Eurovision Song Contest 2020
- Country: Ukraine
- Selection process: National final
- Selection date: 8 September 2020

Competing entry
- Song: "Vidkryvai (Open Up)"
- Artist: Oleksandr Balabanov
- Songwriters: Mykhailo Klymenko; Oleksandr Balabanov

Placement
- Final result: 7th, 106 points

Participation chronology

Ukraine was represented at the Junior Eurovision Song Contest 2020, which was held in Warsaw, Poland, with the song "Vidkryvai" performed by Oleksandr Balabanov. Their entrant was selected through a national selection, organised by the Ukrainian broadcaster UA:PBC.

== Background ==
Prior to the 2020 contest, Ukraine had participated in the Junior Eurovision Song Contest fourteen times since its debut in 2006. Ukraine have never missed a contest since their debut appearance, having won the contest once in 2012 with the song "Nebo", performed by Anastasiya Petryk. The Ukrainian capital Kyiv has hosted the contest twice, at the Palace of Sports in 2009, and the Palace "Ukraine" in 2013. In the 2019 contest, Sophia Ivanko represented her country in Gliwice, Poland with the song the "Spirit of Music". She placed 15th out of 19 entries with 59 points.

== Before Junior Eurovision ==
=== National final ===
UA:PBC announced that they would be participating at the 2020 contest in June of that year. The broadcaster launched the Ukrainian selection process on 5 August 2020, accepting submissions until 25 August 2020. All applications that complied with the rules were uploaded on YouTube and the candidate that had received the most likes on the platform advanced automatically to the next stage of the program. The final shortlist was announced on 28 August 2020 with an online vote due to open a week later on 5 September 2020 to decide the winning entry alongside a professional jury.

==== Competing entries ====
The submissions accepted by UA:PBC were revealed online and users had until 27 August 2020 to vote for their favourite entries by giving a like. The entry with the most likes directly advanced to the national final. A selection panel then reviewed the remaining submissions and selected ten entries to compete in the national final: eight original songs and two cover songs. On 18 August 2020, Maksym Tkachuk was disqualified from the competition as it was discovered that he had performed in the Autonomous Republic of Crimea after its annexation as part of a competition allegedly organised by the Russian Foreign Affairs Ministry, breaching the Section 3.4. on the national selection's rules. On 28 August 2020, the eleven selected competing acts were announced on Instagram.

Entry received the most YouTube likes Qualified for the final Disqualified

Original song selection
Artist	Song	Result
Angelina McFarlane	"My Spirit"	Advanced
Anhelina Terennikova	"The Vibe"	Advanced
Anastasiya Fuchenko	"Funky Boy"	Eliminated
Anna Motyl	"Zavtra" (Завтра)	Eliminated
Anna Tkach	"Flying So High"	Eliminated
Daniela Dmitrieva	"Polyubila" (Полюбила)	Eliminated
Daniela Shapochnikova	"Tvoye maybutnye" (Твоє майбутнє)	Advanced
Darya Moskalenko	"Ya Viryu" (Я Вірю)	Eliminated
Darya Rebrova	"My vilni" (Ми вільні)	Eliminated
Daryna Roman	"Human of the World"	Eliminated
Dmytro Banar	"Zhyttya yak fortepiano" (Життя як фортепіано)	Eliminated
Fishki	"Strybay" (Стрибай)	Eliminated
Katerina Huliy	"Make Up Your Mind"	Eliminated
Iosif Kozlovsky	"Dreaming in the Rain"	Eliminated
Iryna Sheheda	"Syla-lyubov moya!" (Сила-любов моя!)	Eliminated
Karina Zajec	"Zhyva" (Жива)	Eliminated
Lidiya Okilko	"Svitanok" (Світанок)	Eliminated
Los Bananas	"Dive in the Water"	Eliminated
Mariya Danilova	"Syayvo" (Сяйво)	Eliminated
Mariya Tkachuk	"Vstyhnemo vse!" (Встигнемо все!)	Eliminated
Milena Putyato	"Move Your Body"	Eliminated
Nikita Boyarintsev	"Idy vpeder" (Іди вперед)	Eliminated
Oleksandr Balabanov	"Vidkryvai" (Відкривай)	Advanced
Oleksiy Bekreshov	"Hochu ya" (Хочу я)	Eliminated
Olena Usenko	"Never Get Free"	Advanced
Polina Babiy	"SuperBit"	Advanced
Sofia Adamiv	"Zatamuju podyx" (Затамую подих)	Eliminated
Sofiya Kostyrko	"Muzyka" (Музика)	Eliminated
Sofiya Mohilna	"Ty mozhesh zminyti vse" (Ти можеш змінити все)	Eliminated
Sofiya Salvarydu	"Hora" (Гора)	Eliminated
Sofia Shkidchenko	"OK"	Advanced
Valeriya Kostyuchenko	"Ya taka yak ye" (Я така як є)	Eliminated
Veronika Petrus	"Mriya zhyttya" (Мрія життя)	Eliminated
Viktoriya Borbunevych	"Kozhen den" (Кожен день)	Eliminated
Yaroslav Politov	"Ya b tudy" (Я б туди)	Advanced
Yelizaveta Bilokon	"Litayu ya" (Літаю я)	Eliminated
Yevangelina Zamula	"We're the One"	Eliminated
Yuliya Karimi	"People"	Advanced

Cover selection
Artist	Song	Result
Alisa Botvintseva	"Ukrayintsi" (Українці)	Eliminated
Alisa Chydzhan	"Letyt halka cherez balku" (Летить галка через балку)	Eliminated
Alina Hyrych	"Ahov" (Агов)	Eliminated
Anastasiya Bratashchuk	"The Start"	Eliminated
Anastasiya Zhukova	"Better Love" (Note: While the original song is in English, the song was performed in Ukrainian.)	Eliminated
Arina Hmelyuk	"Golden Slumbers"	Eliminated
Darin Osman	"A Natural Woman"	Advanced
Darina Sidorova	"Sila" (Сила)	Eliminated
Daryna Kryvenko	"Solovey" (Соловей)	Eliminated
Ivanna Ohyr	"Oh! Darling"	Eliminated
Kateryna Herasymchuk	"Make the World Go Away"	Eliminated
Kristina Dushutina	"Symphony"	Eliminated
Kristina Osychenko	"Teche voda" (Тече вода)	Eliminated
Liliya Lavriv	"Mahiya muzyky" (Магія музики)	Eliminated
~~Maksym Tkachuk~~	~~"Dzhamajka" (Джамайка)~~	Disqualified
Mariya Vavrish	"Runnin' (Lose It All)"	Eliminated
Matviy Krupskyy	"Novyi den" (Новий день)	Eliminated
Nika Korniyenko	"Holubka" (Голубка)	Eliminated
Nikita Achkasov	"My Oasis"	Advanced
Oleksandra Mazur	"Yesterday"	Eliminated
Oleksandra Melkonyan	"Dance Monkey"	Eliminated
Polina Zahnoy	"Move" (Note: While the original song is in English, the song was performed in Ukrainian.)	Eliminated
Sofiya Bishova	"Giant"	Eliminated
Sofiya Samolyuk	"Listen"	Eliminated
Sofiya Vinnik	"Cheremshina" (Черемшина)	Eliminated
Valeriya Koval	"Strange Birds"	Eliminated
Vera Melnichenko	"Bad Dreams"	Eliminated
Veronika Dubina	"Take Me Home"	Eliminated
Yehor Umanets	"Creep"	Eliminated
Yelizaveta Doroshenko	"Warrior"	Eliminated
Yelizaveta Grihorenko	"Right Now"	Eliminated
Yelizaveta Sokolovskaya	"Can't Pretend"	Eliminated

==== Final ====
The eleven competing entries were published online on 5 September 2020 and the winner was selected through the combination of both public online vote and the votes of jury members made up of music professionals. Eight jury members each awarded one vote to their favourite entry and each member had an equal stake in the final result. The jury panel that was responsible for 8/9 of the final result consisted of: Jamala (winner of the Eurovision Song Contest 2016), Alina Pash (singer, rapper), Taras Topolya (lead vocalist of Antytila), Ruslana Khazipova (member of Dakh Daughters), Dmytro Shurov (lead vocalist of Pianoboy), Larysa Klyuyevska (music editor at UA:Radio Promin), Timur Miroshnychenko (television presenter, Junior Eurovision commentator for Ukraine), Lyubov Morozova (music critic, host at UA:Kultura). For the online vote, users will be able to vote for their favourite entries from 5 September 2020 to 8 September 2020 via UA:PBC's official website junior.eurovision.ua, and the results had a weighting equal to the votes of a single jury member. Originally, the winner was to be revealed on 12 September 2020. However, UA:PBC confirmed through its official Instagram account that Oleksandr Balabanov will represent Ukraine at the Junior Eurovision Song Contest 2020. He received 5 points in total from the jurors, with Daniela Shapochnikova winning the online voting.

Final – 12 September 2020
Artist	Song	Jury	Online voting		Total	Place
Artist	Song	Jury	Percentage	Points	Total	Place
Anhelina Terennykova	"The Vibe"	0	3.12%	0	0	5
Daniela Shapochnikova	"Tvoie maibutnie" (Твоє майбутнє)	0	39.98%	1	1	3
Darin Osman	"Hello"	0	2.01%	0	0	5
Ellen	"Never Get Free"	2	16.61%	0	2	2
Nikita Achkasov	"Hello"	0	2.85%	0	0	5
Oleksandr Balabanov	"Vidkryvai" (Відкривай)	5	12.60%	0	5	1
Polina Babiy	"Superbit"	0	1.9%	0	0	5
Rrealina	"My Spirit"	0	3.60%	0	0	5
Sofia Shkidchenko	"Ok"	0	0.65%	0	0	5
Yar Politov	"Ya b tudy" (Я б туди)	1	14.27%	0	1	3
Yuliya Karimi	"People"	0	2.42%	0	0	5

Detailed jury votes
Artist	Jamala	A. Pash	T. Topolya	R. Khazipova	D. Shurov	L. Klyuyevska	T. Miroshnychenko	L. Morozova	Total
Anhelina Terennykova									0
Daniela Shapochnikova									0
Darin Osman									0
Ellen						X		X	2
Nikita Achkasov									0
Oleksandr Balabanov		X	X	X	X		X		5
Polina Babiy									0
Rrealina									0
Sofia Shkidchenko									0
Yar Politov	X								1
Yuliya Karimi									0

== Artist and song information ==
Oleksandr Balabanov
- Born: 5 July 2006 (age 20); Donetsk, Ukraine
- Occupation: Singer
- Instrument: Vocals

(Ukraine) "Vidkryvai (Open Up)"

Junior Eurovision Song Contest 2020 entry
- Country: Ukraine
- Artist: Oleksandr Balabanov
- Languages: Ukrainian; English
- Composers: Mykhailo Klymenko; Oleksandr Balabanov
- Lyricists: Mykhailo Klymenko; Oleksandr Balabanov

Finals performance
- Final result: 7
- Final points: 106

Entry chronology
- ◄ "The Spirit of Music" (2019)
- "Vazhil" (2021) ►

=== Oleksandr Balabanov ===
Oleksandr Balabanov (Ukrainian: Олександр Балабанов; born 5 July 2006) is a Ukrainian singer. He represented Ukraine at the Junior Eurovision Song Contest 2020 with the song "Vidkryvai".

=== Vidkryvai (Open Up) ===
"Vidkryvai (Open Up)" (Ukrainian: Відкривай) is a song by Ukrainian singer Oleksandr Balabanov. It represented Ukraine at the Junior Eurovision Song Contest 2020.

== At Junior Eurovision ==
After the opening ceremony, which took place on 23 November 2020, it was announced that Ukraine will perform eleventh on 29 November 2020, following Spain and preceding France.

=== Voting ===
The same voting system that was introduced in the 2017 edition was used, where the results were determined by 50% online voting and 50% jury voting. Every participating broadcaster assembled a national jury that consisted of three music industry professionals and two children aged between 10 and 15 who were citizens of the country they represented. The rankings of those jurors were combined to make an overall top ten.

The online voting consisted of two phases. The first phase of the online voting began on 27 November 2020 when a recap of all the rehearsal performances was shown on the contest's website Junioreurovision.tv before the viewers could vote. After this, voters also had the option to watch longer one-minute clips from each participant's rehearsal. This first round of voting ended on 29 November at 15:59 CET. The second phase of the online voting took place during the live show and began right after the last performance and was open for 15 minutes. International viewers were able to vote for three songs. They were also able to vote for their own country's song. These votes were then turned into points which were determined by the percentage of votes received. For example, if a song received 10% of the votes, it received 10% of the available points.

Ukraine received 106 points; 52 from the juries and 54 from online voting, reaching 7th place.

Points awarded to Ukraine
Score	Country
12 points	
10 points	Poland; Russia
8 points	Spain
7 points	France; Georgia
6 points	
5 points	
4 points	Germany
3 points	Serbia
2 points	Netherlands
1 point	Kazakhstan
Ukraine received 54 points from the online vote

Points awarded by Ukraine
Score	Country
12 points	Georgia
10 points	France
8 points	Spain
7 points	Kazakhstan
6 points	Belarus
5 points	Netherlands
4 points	Malta
3 points	Russia
2 points	Germany
1 point	Serbia

==== Detailed voting results ====
Detailed voting results from Ukraine
Draw	Country	Juror A	Juror B	Juror C	Juror D	Juror E	Rank	Points
01	Germany	11	11	10	6	5	9	2
02	Kazakhstan	1	4	7	4	6	4	7
03	Netherlands	8	2	4	3	8	6	5
04	Serbia	9	9	8	9	10	10	1
05	Belarus	3	5	6	2	7	5	6
06	Poland	10	6	11	11	9	11	
07	Georgia	5	1	3	1	4	1	12
08	Malta	7	10	9	5	3	7	4
09	Russia	6	7	5	10	11	8	3
10	Spain	2	8	2	7	1	3	8
11	Ukraine							
12	France	4	3	1	8	2	2	10
