= Germany in the Junior Eurovision Song Contest =

- Junior Eurovision Song Contest
- Participating broadcaster: Kika (2020–2024); Zweites Deutsches Fernsehen (ZDF; 2020); Norddeutscher Rundfunk (NDR; 2021–2024)

Participation summary
- Appearances: 4
- First appearance: 2020
- Last appearance: 2024
- Highest placement: 9th: 2023
- Participation history: 2020; 2021; 2022; 2023; 2024; 2025 – 2026

External links
- Kika page
- For the most recent participation see Germany in the Junior Eurovision Song Contest 2024

Germany has been represented at the Junior Eurovision Song Contest four times since 2020. Children's television channel Kika, a joint venture of the German national broadcasters ARD and Zweites Deutsches Fernsehen (ZDF), participated in the contest from its debut until 2024, with ZDF itself joining it as the co-responsible in 2020 and ARD consortium member Norddeutscher Rundfunk (NDR) doing so between 2021 and 2024.

== History ==
=== Before participation ===
Germany was originally going to take part in the 2003 contest in Copenhagen, but later withdrew from the contest. They also planned to take part in the 2004 contest in Lillehammer but again withdrew from the contest. In addition, NDR also broadcast the 2003, 2015 and 2016 contests. For 2003, the broadcaster organised a delayed broadcast on Kika whilst the contests in 2015 and 2016 were livestreamed via the broadcaster's Eurovision Song Contest website eurovision.de with commentary provided by Thomas Mohr.

In May 2014, NDR announced they would not debut at the 2014 contest as they believed the contest would not be a success under German television marketing standards. They did, however, observe the 2013 contest in Kyiv, Ukraine. ZDF attended the 2014 Contest in Malta. On 1 July 2015, ARD consortium member NDR launched an online poll to decide whether Germany should participate in the 2015 contest, which would be broadcast on their children's station, Kika (a joint venture of ARD and ZDF). Germany ultimately did not participate.

In December 2019, Kika confirmed that a delegation from the broadcaster and NDR was attending the 2019 contest in Gliwice, Poland to experience the competition as part of the audience. It was emphasised that no decision had yet been made as to whether Germany would participate the following year or not although there were close discussions with the EBU.

=== Debut ===
On 8 July 2020, Kika confirmed that a delegation from broadcasters NDR and ZDF was participating for the first time in the 2020 contest in Warsaw. Their first ever representative, Susan Oseloff, finished in last place during the final on 29 November 2020, scoring 66 points. Nevertheless, Germany confirmed their participation in 2021 contest in France. On 10 September 2021, a national final was held to select the German representative for the 2021 contest, and it was won by Pauline Steinmüller with the song "Imagine Us". In Paris, Pauline finished 17th out of 19 countries, receiving 61 points.

On 2 August 2022, Kika and NDR confirmed they would not be participating in the 2022 edition in Yerevan, Armenia, wanting to take a "creative break", and citing partial travel warnings for Armenia issued by the Federal Foreign Office. They also confirmed that Kika would still be broadcasting the contest. The country returned to the contest in 2023. Their entrant for 2023, Fia, with song "Ohne Worte" was also selected through a national final. At the 2023 contest, held in Nice, Fia achieved the best result for Germany so far, finishing 9th with 107 points.

A national final was once again held to determine the German representative for the 2024 contest. It took place on 1 July 2024, with Bjarne emerging as winner. He represented Germany at the 2024 contest in Spain, with the song "Save the Best for Us", reaching 11th place and scoring 71 points.

=== KiKa's permanent withdrawal ===
On 7 March 2025, Kika confirmed it would not be participating in 2025, with no reason provided. However, it confirmed that it would still broadcast the contest. On 11 March 2025, Kika revealed that it would now be the sole broadcaster responsible for German participation. On 3 April 2026, KiKa announced it would permanently withdraw from both participating in and broadcasting the contest, leaving Germany without a means of participation for the foreseeable future unless another German EBU member takes over, being either ARD or ZDF, both without KiKa's involvement.

== Participation overview ==
Table key
◁	Last place

Year	Artist	Song	Language	Place	Points
2020	Susan	"Stronger with You"	German, English	12 ◁	66
2021	Pauline	"Imagine Us"	German, English	17	61
2023	Fia	"Ohne Worte"	German (Note: Contains phrases French, English and Spanish; Signed German was also used during the live televised performance.)	9	107
2024	Bjarne	"Save the Best for Us"	German, English	11	71

== Commentators and spokespersons ==
Prior to their first participation in 2020, Germany had broadcast the competition on three occasions.

Year	Television		Radio		Spokesperson	Ref.
Year	Channel	Commentator	Channel	Commentator	Spokesperson	Ref.
2003	Kika	Unknown	No broadcast		Did not participate	
2004–2014	No broadcast		No broadcast		Did not participate	N/A
2015	NDR website	Thomas Mohr	No broadcast		Did not participate	
2016	NDR website	Thomas Mohr	No broadcast		Did not participate	
2017–2019	No broadcast		No broadcast		Did not participate	N/A
2020	Kika	Bürger Lars Dietrich	No broadcast		Olivia	
2021	Kika	Constantin Zöller	No broadcast		Venetia	
2022	Kika	Constantin Zöller	No broadcast		Did not participate	
2023	Kika	Constantin Zöller	No broadcast		Vivienne Craig	
2024	Kika	Constantin Zöller	MausLive via WDR 5	Annika Witzel and Max Plate	Unknown	
2025	Kika	Felix Schmutzler	No broadcast		Did not participate	
2026	No broadcast		No broadcast		Did not participate	

== See also ==
- Germany in the Eurovision Song Contest
