= Serbia in the Junior Eurovision Song Contest 2020 =

- Junior Eurovision Song Contest 2020
- Country: Serbia
- Selection process: Internal selection
- Announcement date: Artist: 25 September 2020; Song: 9 October 2020

Competing entry
- Song: "Heartbeat"
- Artist: Petar Aničić
- Songwriters: Vladimir Graić; Leontina Vukomanović; Petar Aničić; Nemanja Filipović

Placement
- Final result: 11th, 85 points

Participation chronology

Serbia was represented at the Junior Eurovision Song Contest 2020 in Warsaw, Poland. Radio Television of Serbia (RTS) selected Petar Aničić, who achieved 11th place with 85 points.

== Background ==
Prior to the 2020 contest, Serbia had participated in the Junior Eurovision Song Contest eleven times since its debut in 2006, and once as Serbia and Montenegro in 2005, prior to the Montenegrin independence referendum in 2006 which culminated into the dissolution of Serbia and Montenegro, As of 2020, Serbia's best results are two third places, achieved in 2007 and 2010. In the 2019 contest, Serbia placed 10th with Darija Vračević and the song "Podigni glas".

== Before Junior Eurovision ==
On 25 September 2020, RTS announced that Petar Aničić would represent Serbia in the contest with the song "Heartbeat".

== At Junior Eurovision ==
After the opening ceremony, which took place on 23 November 2020, it was announced that Serbia will perform fourth on 29 November 2020, following the Netherlands and preceding Belarus.

=== Voting ===
The same voting system that was introduced in the 2017 edition was used, where the results were determined by 50% online voting and 50% jury voting. Every participating broadcaster assembled a national jury that consisted of three music industry professionals and two children aged between 10 and 15 who were citizens of the country they represented. The rankings of those jurors were combined to make an overall top ten.

The online voting consisted of two phases. The first phase of the online voting began on 27 November 2020 when a recap of all the rehearsal performances was shown on the contest's website Junioreurovision.tv before the viewers could vote. After this, voters also had the option to watch longer one-minute clips from each participant's rehearsal. This first round of voting ended on 29 November at 15:59 CET. The second phase of the online voting took place during the live show and began right after the last performance and was open for 15 minutes. International viewers were able vote for three songs. They were also able to vote for their own country's song. These votes were then turned into points which were determined by the percentage of votes received. For example, if a song received 10% of the votes, it received 10% of the available points.

Points awarded to Serbia
Score	Country
12 points	France
10 points	
8 points	
7 points	
6 points	
5 points	Georgia
4 points	Belarus; Netherlands
3 points	Kazakhstan; Russia
2 points	Malta
1 point	Spain; Ukraine
Serbia received 50 points from the online vote

Points awarded by Serbia
Score	Country
12 points	Belarus
10 points	Kazakhstan
8 points	Poland
7 points	France
6 points	Spain
5 points	Georgia
4 points	Netherlands
3 points	Ukraine
2 points	Germany
1 point	Malta

==== Detailed voting results ====
Detailed voting results from Serbia
Draw	Country	Juror A	Juror B	Juror C	Juror D	Juror E	Rank	Points
01	Germany	9	11	9	9	8	9	2
02	Kazakhstan	3	1	6	3	6	2	10
03	Netherlands	6	6	8	5	5	7	4
04	Serbia							
05	Belarus	1	2	1	1	1	1	12
06	Poland	5	7	2	4	2	3	8
07	Georgia	2	5	4	6	10	6	5
08	Malta	10	9	10	8	9	10	1
09	Russia	11	10	11	10	7	11	
10	Spain	4	4	5	7	3	5	6
11	Ukraine	8	3	7	11	11	8	3
12	France	7	8	3	2	4	4	7
