= Belarus in the Junior Eurovision Song Contest 2020 =

- Junior Eurovision Song Contest 2020
- Country: Belarus
- Selection process: Internal selection
- Announcement date: 8 October 2020

Competing entry
- Song: "Aliens"
- Artist: Arina Pehtereva
- Songwriters: Daniil Zabela; Arina Pehtereva

Placement
- Final result: 5th, 130 points

Participation chronology

Belarus was represented at the Junior Eurovision Song Contest 2020 in Warsaw, Poland. Belarusian Television and Radio Company (BTRC) selected Arina Pehtereva with her song "Aliens" through an internal selection. She achieved 5th place with 130 points.

As of 2026, this was Belarus' last entry to compete in the contest, as well as its final appearance in any Eurovision event, before the country was expelled from the EBU the following year.

== Background ==
Prior to the 2020 contest, Belarus had participated in the Junior Eurovision Song Contest seventeen times since its first entry at the inaugural contest in 2003. Belarus have taken part in every edition of the contest since 2003, and have won the contest twice: in 2005 with Ksenia Sitnik performing the song "My vmeste"; and again in 2007 with Alexey Zhigalkovich performing the entry "S druz'yami". The country previously hosted the 2010 contest in Minsk and hosted for a second year in 2018, with Daniel Yastremski representing the country with the song "Time". It placed 11th with 114 points.

== Before Junior Eurovision ==
=== Internal selection ===
On 14 July 2020, BTRC opened a submission period where artists and composers would be able to submit their entries for the competition until 15 August. At the time, the broadcaster had not yet officially confirmed its participation in the contest but stated it would announce a decision by 7 September, with restrictions on entering the European Union – of which host country Poland is a member, while Belarus is not – in light of the COVID-19 pandemic at that time expected to influence their final decision; upon the announcement of the participants list by the EBU on 8 September, Belarus was confirmed as a participant. By 24 August, a focus group selected up to 15 artists to compete in a national final, which was to be held by 16 October, though BTRC reserved the right to opt for an internal selection instead should pandemic circumstances not allow a televised final to be held; this was later enacted following an escalation of the 2020–2021 Belarusian protests, marking the first time Belarus selected its entrant internally.

On 8 October 2020, BTRC announced that it had internally selected Arina Pehtereva with the song "Aliens" as its representative for the 2020 contest; Pehtereva had competed in Detskoye Yevrovideniye. Natsional'nyy otbor in 2017 (alongside Anastasia Dmitrachkova) and 2019, and was appointed the spokesperson for the Macedonian jury at the 2018 contest.

=== Preparation ===
Due to logistical challenges related to the COVID-19 pandemic, most participants performed their songs remotely from television studios in their respective countries. Pehtereva's performance was recorded on 3 November 2020 at the BTRC studios in Minsk, following rehearsals on 1 November; each broadcaster was allowed three takes, with the Belarusian delegation ultimately selecting the second take as the official contest performance.

== At Junior Eurovision ==
After the opening ceremony, which took place on 23 November 2020, it was announced that Belarus will perform fifth on 29 November 2020, following Serbia and preceding Poland.

=== Voting ===
The same voting system that was introduced in the 2017 edition was used, where the results were determined by 50% online voting and 50% jury voting. Every participating broadcaster assembled a national jury that consisted of three music industry professionals and two children aged between 10 and 15 who were citizens of the country they represented. The rankings of those jurors were combined to make an overall top ten.

The online voting consisted of two phases. The first phase of the online voting began on 27 November 2020 when a recap of all the rehearsal performances was shown on the contest's website Junioreurovision.tv before the viewers could vote. After this, voters also had the option to watch longer one-minute clips from each participant's rehearsal. This first round of voting ended on 29 November at 15:59 CET. The second phase of the online voting took place during the live show and began right after the last performance and was open for 15 minutes. International viewers were able to vote for three songs. They were also able to vote for their own country's song. These votes were then turned into points which were determined by the percentage of votes received. For example, if a song received 10% of the votes, it received 10% of the available points.

Points awarded to Belarus
| Score | Country |
|---|---|
| 12 points | Kazakhstan; Poland; Serbia |
| 10 points | |
| 8 points | |
| 7 points | Germany; Malta |
| 6 points | Russia; Ukraine |
| 5 points | Spain |
| 4 points | |
| 3 points | Georgia |
| 2 points | France |
| 1 point | Netherlands |
Belarus received 57 points from the online vote

Points awarded by Belarus
| Score | Country |
|---|---|
| 12 points | France |
| 10 points | Kazakhstan |
| 8 points | Russia |
| 7 points | Spain |
| 6 points | Malta |
| 5 points | Netherlands |
| 4 points | Serbia |
| 3 points | Germany |
| 2 points | Poland |
| 1 point | Georgia |

==== Detailed voting results ====
Detailed voting results from Belarus
| Draw | Country | Juror A | Juror B | Juror C | Juror D | Juror E | Rank | Points |
|---|---|---|---|---|---|---|---|---|
| 01 | Germany | 8 | 7 | 9 | 8 | 4 | 8 | 3 |
| 02 | Kazakhstan | 3 | 3 | 3 | 2 | 2 | 2 | 10 |
| 03 | Netherlands | 4 | 6 | 7 | 9 | 7 | 6 | 5 |
| 04 | Serbia | 7 | 5 | 5 | 11 | 6 | 7 | 4 |
| 05 | Belarus | | | | | | | |
| 06 | Poland | 11 | 11 | 6 | 3 | 11 | 9 | 2 |
| 07 | Georgia | 9 | 10 | 8 | 5 | 9 | 10 | 1 |
| 08 | Malta | 5 | 8 | 4 | 7 | 5 | 5 | 6 |
| 09 | Russia | 6 | 2 | 1 | 6 | 8 | 3 | 8 |
| 10 | Spain | 2 | 4 | 10 | 4 | 3 | 4 | 7 |
| 11 | Ukraine | 10 | 9 | 11 | 10 | 10 | 11 | |
| 12 | France | 1 | 1 | 2 | 1 | 1 | 1 | 12 |
