= Junior Eurovision Song Contest 2020 =

International song competition for youth

- #MoveTheWorld!

Date and venue
- Final: 29 November 2020
- Venue: Studio 5 TVP headquarters Warsaw, Poland

Organisation
- Organiser: European Broadcasting Union (EBU)
- Executive supervisor: Martin Österdahl

Production
- Host broadcaster: Telewizja Polska (TVP)
- Directors: Marcin Migalski; Tomasz Motyl
- Executive producer: Marta Piekarska
- Presenters: Ida Nowakowska; Małgorzata Tomaszewska; Rafał Brzozowski

Participants
- Number of entries: 12
- Debuting countries: Germany
- Non-returning countries: Albania; Armenia; Australia; Ireland; Italy; North Macedonia; Portugal; Wales
- Participation map: Competing countries Countries that participated in the past but not in 2020

Vote
- Voting system: The professional jury of each country awards a set of 12, 10, 8-1 points to 10 songs. Viewers around the world vote for 3 songs, and their votes are distributed proportionally. The votes of the jury and the audience make up 50% of all votes.
- Winning song: France "J'imagine"

The Junior Eurovision Song Contest 2020 was the 18th edition of the Junior Eurovision Song Contest, held on 29 November 2020 at the TVP headquarters in Warsaw, Poland, and presented by Ida Nowakowska, Małgorzata Tomaszewska, and Rafał Brzozowski. It was organised by the European Broadcasting Union (EBU) and host broadcaster Telewizja Polska (TVP), which staged the event after winning the 2019 contest for Poland with the song "Superhero" by Viki Gabor. This was the first time the contest was held in the same country for two consecutive years. Due to the COVID-19 pandemic, the competing performances were pre-recorded by the participating broadcasters remotely, under the supervision of the EBU under similar conditions, and the participating artists followed the event from their countries of origin.

Broadcasters from twelve countries participated in the contest, the smallest number of participants since 2013. Some countries cited the pandemic and its resulting travel restrictions as the reasons for their non-participation. Meanwhile, Germany participated for the first time.

The winner was France with the song "J'imagine" by Valentina. This was France's first victory in the contest, as well as its first win at a Eurovision event since Eurovision Young Dancers 1989. Kazakhstan and Spain finished second and third, respectively, for the second year in a row. The Netherlands and Belarus completed the top five, with the Netherlands finishing fourth also for the second year in a row. Debuting country Germany finished last.

== Location ==
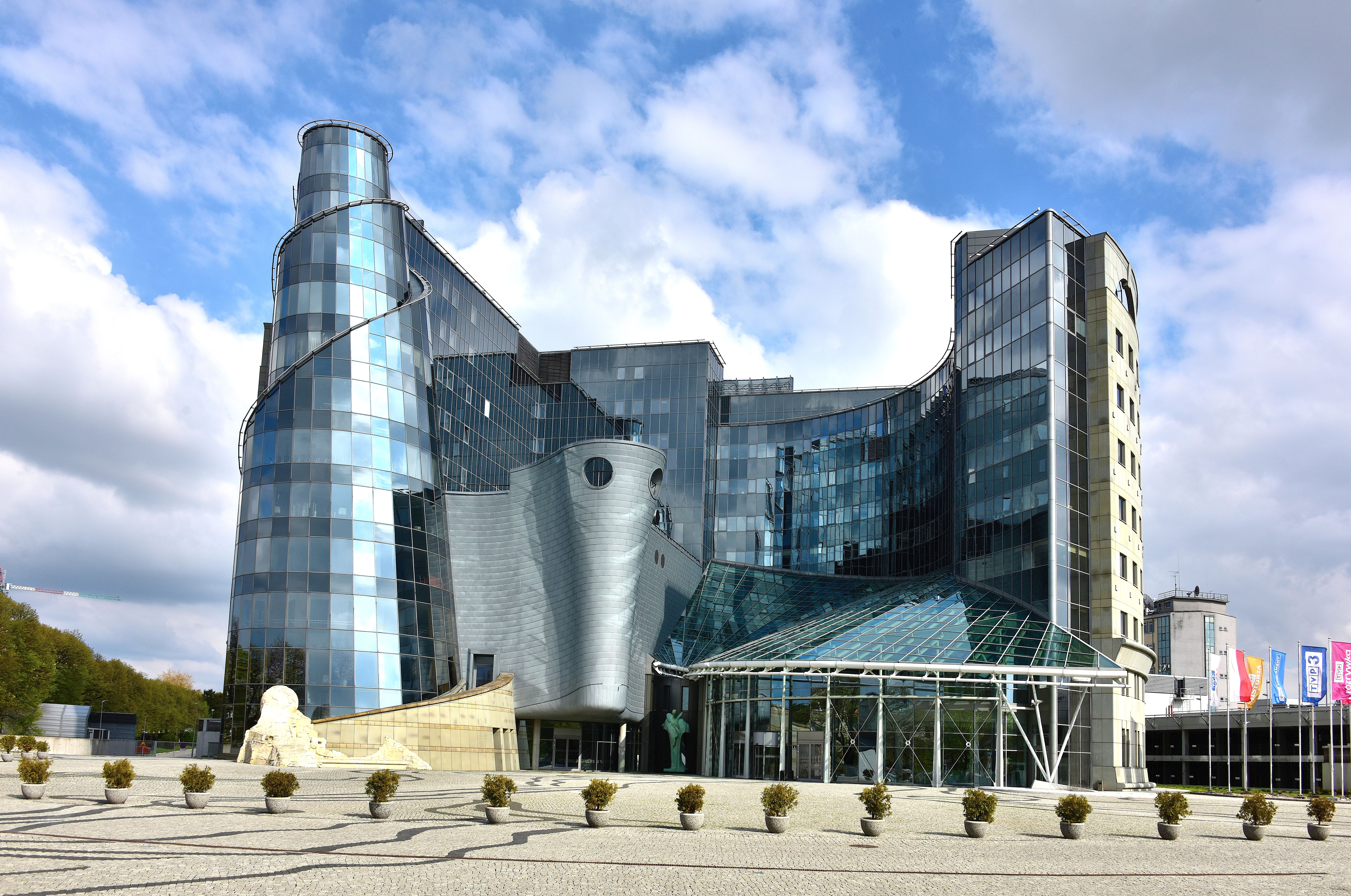
TVP headquarters, the venue of Junior Eurovision 2020.

The Junior Eurovision Song Contest 2020 took place in Studio 5 in the TVP headquarters in Warsaw, Poland, after the country won the 2019 contest on home soil in Gliwice with the song "Superhero" by Viki Gabor. However, due to the COVID-19 pandemic, for the first time, all the competing songs were performed in a studio in each participating country.

It was the third time Warsaw hosted a Eurovision event (after the Eurovision Young Musicians 1994 and the Eurovision Young Dancers 2005), and the first time the contest is held in the same country in two consecutive years.

=== Bidding phase and host city selection ===
Location of the candidate city (red) and the chosen host city (blue)

After Poland's victory in the 2019 contest, the director-general of Polish broadcaster Telewizja Polska (TVP), Jacek Kurski, stated that the country would apply to host the event again in 2020. However, Kurski stated that the possibility of two consecutive editions of the event in Poland could be frowned upon by the EBU. After a period of uncertainty, in the last week of December 2019, it was reported by Gazeta Wyborcza that some Kraków City Councillors were expressing interest in taking the proposal that the contest be held in the city, focused on Tauron Arena. A few days later on 8 January 2020, the proposal was discussed at the City Council and accepted by the majority of its members. Poland was confirmed as the host country in March 2020 and Kraków was seen as the main frontrunner to become the host city.

Following the cancellation of the Eurovision Song Contest 2020 due to the COVID-19 pandemic, work on the event was suspended indefinitely. On 16 May 2020, during the airing of Eurovision: Europe Shine a Light, it was confirmed that the Junior Eurovision Song Contest 2020 would be held in a minor scale inside a television studio in Warsaw on 29 November.

Later in May 2020, Mayor of Kraków Jacek Majchrowski revealed that the city was originally set to host the event in the Tauron Arena but pulled out due to a dispute over TVP's coverage; the broadcaster, at the time known to align with the speaking points of the Law and Justice (PiS) government, aired a critical report highlighting the city's expenditures during Majchrowski's tenure as mayor, which was seen as an attempt to vilify his image due to his differing political views on certain issues, and, in retaliation, he pulled funding for the event, leading TVP to search for a replacement.

On 7 October, Rafał Brzozowski revealed in an interview for TVP that the contest would take place in Studio 5 at the TVP headquarters in Warsaw. In that studio, TVP1 has produced the game show Jaka to melodia? since 2019. Previously, the venue had organised multiple Polish national finals for both the adult and junior versions of the contest.

== Participants ==
Eligibility for participation in the Junior Eurovision Song Contest requires a national broadcaster with active EBU membership capable of receiving the contest via the Eurovision network and broadcasting it live nationwide. The EBU issues invitations to participate in the contest to all active members.

On 8 September 2020, the EBU announced that broadcasters from 13 countries would participate in the 2020 contest. Germany made its debut, while Albania, Australia, Ireland, Italy, North Macedonia, Portugal and Wales opted not to participate after doing so the previous year, with most of them citing restrictions and concerns related to the COVID-19 pandemic as the reason for their absence. On 5 November 2020, Armenia withdrew from the contest due to the introduction of martial law following the Second Nagorno-Karabakh War; "Why" performed by Maléna Fox (who would go on to win the contest the following year) had previously been selected to represent the country. This was the lowest number of participating countries since 2013, which also had twelve participating countries.

Participants of the Junior Eurovision Song Contest 2020
Country	Broadcaster	Artist	Song	Language	Songwriter(s)	Location (Note: The following column denotes the locations where the performances were filmed, as most of the participants performed their songs remotely in a television studio in their country of origin.)
Belarus	BTRC	Arina Pehtereva	"Aliens"	Russian, English	Arina Pehtereva; Daniil Zabela	Minsk
France	France Télévisions	Valentina	"J'imagine"	French	Igit; Barbara Pravi	Paris
Georgia	GPB	Sandra Gadelia	"You Are Not Alone"	Georgian, English	Giga Kukhianidze; Temo Sajaia	Tbilisi
Germany	Kika	Susan	"Stronger with You"	German, English	Levent Geiger	Hamburg
Kazakhstan	KA	Karakat Bashanova	"Forever"	Kazakh, English	Abulkhair Adam; Khamit Shangaliyev; Ardak Yeleusiz	Almaty
Malta	PBS	Chanel Monseigneur	"Chasing Sunsets"	English	Peter Borg; Emil Calleja Bayliss; Joe Roscoe; Aleandro Spiteri Monseigneur	Warsaw
Netherlands	AVROTROS	Unity	"Best Friends"	Dutch, English	Robert Dorn	Aalsmeer
Poland	TVP	Ala Tracz	"I'll Be Standing"	Polish, English	Sara Chmiel-Gromala; Andrzej Gromala	Warsaw
Russia	VGTRK	Sofia Feskova	"My New Day"	Russian, English	Sofia Feskova; Anna Petryasheva; Vitaly Tomin	Moscow
Serbia	RTS	Petar Aničić	"Heartbeat"	Serbian, English	Petar Aničić; Nemanja Filipović; Vladimir Grai; Leontina Vukomanović	Warsaw
Spain	RTVE	Soleá	"Palante"	Spanish	César G. Ross; Hajar Sbihi; Bruno Valverde	Madrid
Ukraine	UA:PBC	Oleksandr Balabanov	"Vidkryvai (Open Up)" (Відкривай)	Ukrainian, English	Oleksandr Balabanov; Mykhailo Klymenko	Warsaw

=== Official album ===
Cover art of the official album

Prior to the event, a digital compilation album featuring all the songs from the 2020 contest was put together by the European Broadcasting Union and released by Universal Music Group on 13 November 2020. It was the first time since 2012 that the compilation was released physically.

== Production ==
The Junior Eurovision Song Contest 2020 was, like the previous year, a joint project held by TVP and the EBU. In January 2020, the EBU announced that after the Eurovision Song Contest 2020, Martin Österdahl would become the new executive supervisor of both the Junior Eurovision Song Contest and the Eurovision Song Contest, succeeding Jon Ola Sand. Österdahl stated during the press conference before the contest final that this year's event "faced more challenges than perhaps ever before", and that some worked double or triple the normal amount.

For the first time in the contest's history, most of the participants performed their songs remotely, in a series of performances on their country of origin. The EBU stated "to ensure continuity and the fairness of the competition, EBU Members in the 13 (Note: The quote predates Armenia's withdrawal) participating countries have agreed to use a similar stage layout and technical set up to capture the performance of their artist(s)." Due to logistical reasons, aside from Poland, the only three countries to record their performances in Warsaw were Malta, Serbia and Ukraine.

The opening ceremonies, the draw and the interval acts were also broadcast live from Warsaw, with, according to the EBU, "all presenters and necessary crew socially distancing." There was a small audience present.

== Format ==
=== Presenters ===
On 7 October 2020, it was announced that Ida Nowakowska, Rafał Brzozowski, and Małgorzata Tomaszewska would host the contest. Nowakowska was the first person to host either the junior or adult contest two times in a row. Brzozowski is a Polish singer and TV presenter, and later represented Poland in the Eurovision Song Contest 2021. Tomaszewska is a co-host of The Voice of Poland.

On 14 November 2020, journalist and TV host Mateusz Szymkowiak was confirmed as the host for the Opening Ceremony, which took place on 23 November in Warsaw. Szymkowiak was the first person to host the Opening Ceremony of either the junior or adult contest two times in a row.

=== Visual design ===
The theme for the contest, #MoveTheWorld!, was revealed on 16 May 2020, during the broadcast of Eurovision: Europe Shine a Light by Junior Eurovision 2019 winner Viki Gabor. The creative concept behind the slogan is the belief in children that "all important things are done by renowned people: scientists, astronauts, athletes and actors", celebrating the millions of people around the world perform their day-to-day duties with capability and care and the "collective power we hold together."

The main stage in Warsaw was designed by Anna Brodnicka. It was "inspired by the rich symbolism of a circle and its connection to our lives." The participating broadcasters were presented two versions of the stage to film their performances in their own countries. One version of the stage featured LED screens, while the other more simplified stage used projections instead.

The trophy was designed by Kjell Engman of the Swedish glass company Kosta Boda, using the same design as was first introduced in the 2017 contest. The main trophy is a glass microphone with coloured lines inside the upper part, which symbolize the flow of sound.

=== Postcards ===
Each postcard took place in a different location in Poland. They all began with a short clip of the upcoming performer creating a heart with their hands or otherwise gesturing to the camera, followed by an extended sequence involving dance troupes dancing around cardboard models related to a certain profession. Each postcard ended with the upcoming performer giving a gift to a worker in that profession.

- Belarus – Gdańsk
- France – Forest in Podkarpackie Voivodeship
- Georgia – Moszna Castle
- Germany – Solina Dam
- Kazakhstan – Royal Castle, Warsaw
- Malta – Masuria
- Netherlands – Palace of the Kraków Bishops in Kielce
- Poland – Białowieża National Park
- Russia – Katowice
- Serbia – Łódź
- Spain – Szczecin
- Ukraine – Centennial Hall, Wrocław

== Contest overview ==
The event took place on 29 November 2020 at 17:00 CET. Twelve countries participated, with the running order published on 23 November 2020. All the countries competing were eligible to vote with the jury vote, as well as participating and non-participating countries under an aggregated international online vote, eligible to vote. France won with 200 points, winning both the jury and online vote. Kazakhstan came second with 152 points, with Spain completing the top three. Russia, Serbia and Germany occupied the bottom three positions.

Opening the show, Viki Gabor performed her winning song in 2019, "Superhero". She later returned during the interval to perform the winning song for the Netherlands in the adult Eurovision 2019, "Arcade", with Roksana Węgiel and Duncan Laurence, the latter having his appearance inserted via chroma keying. Alicja Szemplińska then performed "Empires", the intended Polish entry for the cancelled Eurovision Song Contest 2020, with co-presenter Ida Nowakowska performing as a backup dancer. Closing the interval, all participants performed the common song, "Move the World", with their appearance also inserted via augmented reality and chroma key.

Following the final, multiple delegations, including winner France, were accused of having used playback and pre-recorded vocals in the recordings of their performances. A formal request to respond to the allegations was denied by the EBU, which responded, "all countries were subject to the same controls and that the playback allegations were not true."

R/O	Country	Artist	Song	Points	Place
1	Germany	Susan	"Stronger with You"	66	12
2	Kazakhstan	Karakat Bashanova	"Forever"	152	2
3	Netherlands	Unity	"Best Friends"	132	4
4	Serbia	Petar Aničić	"Heartbeat"	85	11
5	Belarus	Arina Pehtereva	"Aliens"	130	5
6	Poland	Ala Tracz	"I'll Be Standing"	90	9
7	Georgia	Sandra Gadelia	"You Are Not Alone"	111	6
8	Malta	Chanel Monseigneur	"Chasing Sunsets"	100	8
9	Russia	Sofia Feskova	"My New Day"	88	10
10	Spain	Soleá	"Palante"	133	3
11	Ukraine	Oleksandr Balabanov	"Vidkryvai (Open Up)"	106	7
12	France	Valentina	"J'imagine"	200	1

=== Spokespersons ===
Breaking a tradition introduced in recent years, in which spokespeople from each participating country were part of their respective delegations and giving the results at the contest's venue, for this year the spokespersons announced the jury 12 points from their respective countries and were connected to Warsaw via satellite, in the same way as the adult contest. The following announced the jury 12 points for their respective country:

1. Germany – Olivia
2. Kazakhstan – Saniya Zholzhaksynova
3. Netherlands – Robin de Haas
4. Serbia – Darija Vračević
5. Belarus – Ksenia Galetskaya
6. Poland – Marianna Józefina Piątkowska
7. Georgia – Marita Khvedelidze
8. Malta – Leah Mifsud
9. Russia – Mikella Abramova and Khryusha
10. Spain – Melani García
11. Ukraine – Sophia Ivanko
12. France – Nathan Laface

== Detailed voting results ==
Split results
Place	Combined		Jury		Online Vote	
Place	Country	Points	Country	Points	Country	Points
1	France	200	France	88	France	112
2	Kazakhstan	152	Kazakhstan	83	Spain	73
3	Spain	133	Belarus	73	Kazakhstan	69
4	Netherlands	132	Georgia	69	Netherlands	64
5	Belarus	130	Netherlands	68	Belarus	57
6	Georgia	111	Spain	60	Ukraine	54
7	Ukraine	106	Ukraine	52	Serbia	50
8	Malta	100	Malta	51	Malta	49
9	Poland	90	Poland	46	Poland	44
10	Russia	88	Russia	44	Russia	44
11	Serbia	85	Serbia	35	Georgia	42
12	Germany	66	Germany	27	Germany	39

Detailed voting results
Voting procedure used: 100% jury vote 100% online vote		Total score	Jury vote score	Online vote score	Jury vote											
Voting procedure used: 100% jury vote 100% online vote		Total score	Jury vote score	Online vote score	Germany	Kazakhstan	Netherlands	Serbia	Belarus	Poland	Georgia	Malta	Russia	Spain	Ukraine	France
Contestants	Germany	66	27	39		5		2	3	2	2	5			2	6
Contestants	Kazakhstan	152	83	69	3		8	10	10	3	12	10	12	4	7	4
Contestants	Netherlands	132	68	64	12	7		4	5	8	6	6	2	10	5	3
Contestants	Serbia	85	35	50		3	4		4		5	2	3	1	1	12
Contestants	Belarus	130	73	57	7	12	1	12		12	3	7	6	5	6	2
Contestants	Poland	90	46	44	2	6	5	8	2		8	8	4	2		1
Contestants	Georgia	111	69	42	5	10	6	5	1	5		1	7	12	12	5
Contestants	Malta	100	51	49	1		7	1	6	6	10		1	7	4	8
Contestants	Russia	88	44	44	6	4	3		8	4		3		3	3	10
Contestants	Spain	133	60	73	10	2	10	6	7	7	1	4	5		8	
Contestants	Ukraine	106	52	54	4	1	2	3		10	7		10	8		7
Contestants	France	200	88	112	8	8	12	7	12	1	4	12	8	6	10	

=== 12 points ===
Below is a summary of all 12 points received from each country's professional juries.

N.	Contestant	Nation(s) giving 12 points
3	Belarus	Kazakhstan, Poland, Serbia
3	France	Belarus, Malta, Netherlands
2	Georgia	Spain, Ukraine
2	Kazakhstan	Georgia, Russia
1	Netherlands	Germany
1	Serbia	France

=== Online voting ===
According to the EBU, a total of over 4.5 million valid votes were received during the voting windows.

Online voting results
Contestant	Votes	Points
France	~723,000	112
Spain	~471,000	73
Kazakhstan	~445,000	69
Netherlands	~413,000	64
Belarus	~368,000	57
Ukraine	~348,000	54
Serbia	~322,000	50
Malta	~316,000	49
Poland	~284,000	44
Russia	~284,000	44
Georgia	~271,000	42
Germany	~251,000	39
Total	>4,500,000	697

== Broadcasts ==
Broadcasters and commentators in participating countries
Country	Broadcaster(s)	Channel(s)	Commentator(s)	Ref.
Belarus	BTRC	Belarus 1, Belarus 24	Pavel Lazovik	
France	France Télévisions	France 2	Stéphane Bern, Carla Lazzari	
Georgia	GPB	1TV	Helen Kalandadze	
Germany	ARD/ZDF	Kika	Bürger Lars Dietrich	
Kazakhstan	Khabar Agency	Khabar TV	Mahabbat Esen, Kaldybek Zhaisanbai	
Malta	PBS	TVM	No commentary	
Netherlands	AVROTROS	NPO Zapp via NPO 3	Jan Smit	
Poland	TVP	TVP1, TVP ABC, TVP Polonia	Artur Orzech	
Russia	C1R/VGTRK	Carousel	Anton Zorkin and Khryusha	
Serbia	RTS	RTS2, RTS Svet	Tijana Lukić	
Spain	RTVE	La 1, TVE Internacional	Tony Aguilar, Eva Mora, Víctor Escudero	
Ukraine	UA:PBC	UA:First, UA:Kultura	Timur Miroshnychenko	

Broadcasters and commentators in non-participating countries
Country	Broadcaster(s)	Channel(s)	Commentator(s)	Ref.
Albania	RTSH	RTSH Shkollë (Note: Delayed broadcast in a shortened format on 6 October 2022 at 07:00 CET)		
Lithuania	TVP	TVP Wilno	Artur Orzech	
North Macedonia	MRT		Eli Tanaskovska	
United Kingdom	Radio Six International		Ewan Spence, Ellie Chalkley	

== See also ==
- Eurovision Song Contest 2020
- Eurovision Young Musicians 2020
