= Kazakhstan in the Junior Eurovision Song Contest 2020 =

- Junior Eurovision Song Contest 2020
- Country: Kazakhstan
- Selection process: National Final
- Selection date: 26 September 2020

Competing entry
- Song: "Forever"
- Artist: Karakat Bashanova
- Songwriters: Khamit Shangaliyev; Ardak Yeleusiz; Abulkhair Adam

Placement
- Final result: 2nd, 152 points

Participation chronology

Kazakhstan was represented at the Junior Eurovision Song Contest 2020. The Kazakh entrant for the 2020 contest in Warsaw, Poland was selected through a national selection, organised by the Kazakh broadcaster Khabar Agency (KA). The semi-final took place online between 24 and 31 August 2020, while the final took place on 26 September 2020. "Forever" performed by Karakat Bashanova was as the winner.

== Background ==
Prior to the 2020 contest, Kazakhstan's highest placing in the contest was in 2019, when the song "Armanyńnan qalma" performed by Yerzhan Maxim placed 2nd with 227 points.

As Khabar Agency (KA) is not an active member of the European Broadcasting Union (EBU), the broadcaster requires a special invitation from the EBU to participate in Eurovision events. Khabar was first invited to participate in the Junior Eurovision Song Contest in 2018. Channel 31 had previously expressed their ambitions to debut in the 2018 contest, and had sent a delegation to the 2017 contest.

== Before Junior Eurovision ==
=== National final ===
Kazakhstan's participation in the 2020 contest was confirmed in June 2020, having been invited to participate by the European Broadcasting Union (EBU). Khabar announced on 10 August 2020 that artists will be able to submit their applications for the national final until 20 August 2020. From 684 applications submitted, a nine-member jury panel selected 30 acts for the online semi-final. The jury panel consisted of Zhenis Seidullaevich (composer), Dinara Bisembina (Chairman of the Board of Khabar), Bagym Mukhitdenova (music producer), Kairat Baekenov (singer and composer), Erlan Bekchurin (music producer), Zhanar Dugalova (singer), Amre (singer), Dinaya (singer) and Madi Syzdykov (singer).

==== Semi-final ====
The online semi-final took place between 24 and 31 August 2020 where users were able vote for their favorite artists on Khabar's official website. The top twelve acts with the most votes proceeded to the televised national final and were announced on 1 September 2020.

Semi-final – 1 September 2020
Artist	Votes	Place
Ábilqaıyr Jumabaı	—	—
Adel Kýnadılova	—	—
Adııa Burhanova	34,105	2
Aqjibek Manarbekqyzy	32,978	4
Aknur Nurjanova	—	—
Alına Saǵynbaeva	—	—
Arystan Sherhan	—	—
Aıdana Jumajan	33,224	3
Aıım Mukıtanova	32,089	6
Áıkerim Tileýbek	30,333	11
Aılýn Zaýseva	—	—
Dilnaz Tilepova	—	—
Dinmuhammed Tóleýbaı	—	—
Islam Saıpollda	34,543	1
Janel Qaldybek	—	—
Janerke Abdrahamnova	—	—
Jasmın Tileýinbetova	—	—
Kamıla Ǵazızqyzy	31,770	7
Kamiıa Gılıova	—	—
Kamılla Kýzdenbaeva	—	—
Karakat Bashanova	29,679	12
Mahınur Tursynova	31,282	9
Jan Makim	32,678	5
Mıras Maksımov	—	—
Nazarbek Bekjan	—	—
Nurmuhamed Jaqypbekov	—	—
Nurshat Kýsanova	30,960	10
Saǵin Ómirbaıuly	—	—
Sanııa Altynbekqyzy	31,535	8
Sofııa Balgazına	—	—

==== Final ====
The final took place on 26 September 2020 where twelve competing acts performed their candidate Junior Eurovision songs written for them by composers directly invited by Khabar in a televised production. The winner, "Forever" performed by Karakat Bashanova, was determined by a 50/50 combination of both public telephone vote and the votes of jury members made up of music professionals. "Forever" was composed by Khamit Shangaliyev, who had also composed "Armanyńnan qalma", the Kazakh entry for the 2019 contest, and written by Ardak Yeleusiz and Abulkhair Adam. The song is dedicated to Bashanova's deceased father.

Final – 26 September 2020
Draw	Artist	Song	Jury	Televote	Total	Place
1	Islam Saypolda	"Otan" (Отан)	3.6%	7.4%	11.0%	11
2	Aykerim Tileubek	"Winner"	13.2%	11.0%	24.2%	3
3	Kamila Gazizkyzy	"Jeteleıdi arman" (Жетелейдi арман)	12.1%	2.3%	14.4%	6
4	Zhan Makim	"Brave Heart"	9.1%	5.3%	14.4%	6
5	Nurshat Kusanova	"Týǵan jer" (Туған жер)	5.1%	5.6%	10.7%	12
6	Saniya Altynbekkyzy	"Ómir beles" (Өмiр белес)	7.7%	6.4%	14.1%	8
7	Makhinur Tursunova	"Uly dalanyń áýeni" (Ұлы даланың әуенi)	10.0%	2.7%	12.7%	10
8	Aidana Zhumazhan	"Heal the World"	7.1%	5.8%	12.9%	9
9	Akzhibek Manarbekkyzy	"Jer-Ana" (Жер-Ана)	8.8%	6.7%	15.5%	5
10	Adiya Burkhanova	"Muza" (Муза)	5.0%	13.5%	18.5%	4
11	Karakat Bashanova	"Forever"	14.4%	11.5%	25.9%	1
12	Ayim Mukitanova	"Celebrate"	4.0%	21.1%	25.1%	2

== At Junior Eurovision ==
After the opening ceremony, which took place on 23 November 2020, it was announced that Kazakhstan will perform second on 29 November 2020, following Germany and preceding the Netherlands.

=== Voting ===
The same voting system that was introduced in the 2017 edition was used, where the results were determined by 50% online voting and 50% jury voting. Every participating broadcaster assembled a national jury that consisted of three music industry professionals and two children aged between 10 and 15 who were citizens of the country they represented. The rankings of those jurors were combined to make an overall top ten.

The online voting consisted of two phases. The first phase of the online voting began on 27 November 2020 when a recap of all the rehearsal performances was shown on the contest's website Junioreurovision.tv before the viewers could vote. After this, voters also had the option to watch longer one-minute clips from each participant's rehearsal. This first round of voting ended on 29 November at 15:59 CET. The second phase of the online voting took place during the live show and began right after the last performance and was open for 15 minutes. International viewers were able to vote for three songs. They were also able to vote for their own country's song. These votes were then turned into points which were determined by the percentage of votes received. For example, if a song received 10% of the votes, it received 10% of the available points.

Points awarded to Kazakhstan
Score	Country
12 points	Georgia; Russia
10 points	Belarus; Malta; Serbia
8 points	Netherlands
7 points	Ukraine
6 points	
5 points	
4 points	France; Spain
3 points	Germany; Poland
2 points	
1 point	
Kazakhstan received 69 points from the online vote

Points awarded by Kazakhstan
Score	Country
12 points	Belarus
10 points	Georgia
8 points	France
7 points	Netherlands
6 points	Poland
5 points	Germany
4 points	Russia
3 points	Serbia
2 points	Spain
1 point	Ukraine

==== Detailed voting results ====
Detailed voting results from Kazakhstan
Draw	Country	Juror A	Juror B	Juror C	Juror D	Juror E	Rank	Points
01	Germany	8	8	2	4	10	6	5
02	Kazakhstan							
03	Netherlands	3	2	10	11	5	4	7
04	Serbia	10	6	4	7	11	8	3
05	Belarus	1	1	1	1	1	1	12
06	Poland	9	5	3	5	6	5	6
07	Georgia	2	3	9	3	2	2	10
08	Malta	5	10	11	9	7	11	
09	Russia	4	7	8	10	4	7	4
10	Spain	11	11	5	6	8	9	2
11	Ukraine	6	9	7	8	9	10	1
12	France	7	4	6	2	3	3	8
