= Asha (singer-songwriter) =

Spanish-Moroccan singer-songwriter (born 1997)

- Born: Hajar Sbihi; May 7, 1997 (age 29); Rabat, Morocco
- Origin: Spain, Morocco
- Genres: Contemporary Pop, Flamenco
- Occupations: Singer; Songwriter
- Instrument: Vocals
- Years active: 2018–present

Hajar Sbihi (Arabic: هاجر صبيحي; born May 7, 1997), known professionally as Asha (stylized in all caps), is a Spanish-Moroccan singer-songwriter. She is best known co-writing multiple Spanish language songs, and participating in Benidorm Fest 2026, where she finished as runner up.

== Background ==
Sbihi was born in Morocco and lived there for 18 years. At age 18 she moved to Spain. She had an interest in music during childhood. At age nine, she joined a classical choir, which enabled her to travel around Morocco. She also took part in Bokra, a musical project to promote peace in the Arab world.

== Career ==
While at university, Sbihi connected with a music producer, and began collaborating with artists from Sony Music and Universal Music. She has collaborated with producers, such as RedOne and Quincy Jones and co-written multiple songs, such as "Booty" by Becky G and C. Tangana, "Mala Fama" by Danna Paola, and "Ya no quiero ná" by Lola Índigo. "Booty" was certified double platinum in Spain and triple platinum in the United States.

In 2020, Sbihi released her debut single, Bésame, which gained one million views on YouTube in the first month of its release. In the same year, she composed Spain's Junior Eurovision song "Palante", which placed 3rd.

She released a single titled "SOLA" in 2024.

In 2026, she participated in Benidorm Fest 2026 with her song "Turista". She won the jury vote and placed second in the final. Through an expert panel and a collaboration between RTVE and Spotify, Sbihi was awarded a trip to Spotify's studios in Stockholm to record a Spotify Single. In the same year, she co-wrote RTVE's pride anthem, "Sé quién eres".

On September 15, her Spotify single titled “Rendez-Vous” was released. She debuted the song at Camp Nou at the La Liga match between FC Barcelona and Racing de Santander in front of 60.000 people.

== Style and influences ==
Sbihi's music takes sounds from her Mediterranean roots. She performs contemporary pop music with sounds of reggaeton and flamenco, and records in multiple languages, such as Arabic, French, Spanish and English.

== Songwriting Credits ==
=== Singles ===
- "Ya no quiero ná" by Lola Índigo (2018)
- "Booty" by Becky G and C. Tangana (2018)
- "Mala Fama" by Danna Paola (2019)
- "Bésame" by ASHA (2020)
- "Palante" by Soleá (2020)
- "SOLA" by ASHA (2024)
- "Turista" by ASHA (2025)
- "Sé quién eres" (2026)

== Discography ==
=== Singles ===
- "Bésame" (2020)
- "SOLA" (2024)
- "Turista" (2025)
- "Rendez-Vous" (2026)
