= Poland in the Junior Eurovision Song Contest 2020 =

- Junior Eurovision Song Contest 2020
- Country: Poland
- Selection process: Szansa na sukces
- Selection date: Semi-finals; 6 September 2020; 13 September 2020; 20 September 2020; Final; 27 September 2020

Competing entry
- Song: "I'll Be Standing"
- Artist: Ala Tracz
- Songwriters: Gromee; Sara Chmiel-Gromala

Placement
- Final result: 9th, 90 points

Participation chronology

Poland hosted and participated in the Junior Eurovision Song Contest 2020 in Warsaw. Polish broadcaster Telewizja Polska (TVP) was responsible for the country's participation in the contest, and organised the national final Szansa na sukces to select the Polish entry for the contest. The national final was won by Ala Tracz with the song "I'll Be Standing", which represented Poland in the contest. She ended up in 9th place with 90 points.

== Background ==
Prior to the 2020 contest, Poland had participated in the contest six times: In 2003 and 2004, Poland finished in last place, and they decided not to participate from 2005 to 2015. The country returned in 2016. Olivia Wieczorek was selected to represent the nation that year with the song "Nie zapomnij". Olivia finished in 11th place out of 17 entries with 60 points. In 2017, Alicja Rega was selected to represent Poland with the song "Mój dom". She finished 8th out of 16 entries with 138 points. In both 2018 and 2019, Poland won the Junior Eurovision Song Contest with Roksana Węgiel and Viki Gabor respectively, becoming the first country to win the contest twice in a row.

After Poland's victory in the 2019 contest on home soil in Gliwice, the director-general of TVP, Jacek Kurski, stated that the country would apply to host the event again in 2020. However, Kurski stated that the possibility of two consecutive editions of the event in Poland could be frowned upon by the European Broadcasting Union (EBU). After a period of uncertainty, in the last week of December 2019, it was reported by Gazeta Wyborcza that some Kraków city councillors were expressing interest in taking the proposal that the contest be held in the city, focused on Tauron Arena. A few days later on 8 January 2020, the proposal was discussed at the City Council and accepted by the majority of its members. Poland was confirmed as the host country in March 2020.

== Before Junior Eurovision ==
=== National final ===
==== Format ====
Szansa na sukces consisted of four shows: three semi-finals broadcast on 6 September, 13 September and 20 September, and a final on 27 September. Seven singers competed in each semi-final, with one qualifying for the final as determined by a jury of artists. Each of the three finalists performed one song selected by the producers and one song that would serve as the Polish entry for the Junior Eurovision Song Contest 2020. The winner was determined by an equal combination of jury votes and SMS votes.

==== Semi-finals ====
===== Semi-final 1 =====
The first semi-final was broadcast on 6 September 2020. All seven semi-finalists performed intergenerational hits. The jury consisted of three members:

- Viki Gabor – singer, winner of the Junior Eurovision Song Contest 2019
- Edyta Górniak – singer, Polish representative in the Eurovision Song Contest 1994
- Piotr Rubik – composer

Semi-final 1 – 6 September 2020
Draw	Artist	Song	Result
1	Gabriela Łukasik	"Superhero"	Eliminated
2	Mikołaj Gajowy	"Niech mówią, że to nie jest miłość"	Eliminated
3	Lena Marzec	"Andromeda"	Finalist
4	Aurelia Radecka	"Getaway"	Honourable mention
5	Hanna Dzieniewicz	"Nie zapomnij"	Eliminated
6	Antonina Biesiadecka	"Król"	Eliminated
7	Amelia Karczewska	"Psalm dla Ciebie"	Honourable mention

===== Semi-final 2 =====
The second semi-final was broadcast on 13 September 2020. All seven semi-finalists performed famous worldwide hits. The jury consisted of three members:

- Michał Wiśniewski – singer, Polish representative in the Eurovision Song Contest 2003 and the Eurovision Song Contest 2006
- Cleo – singer, represented Poland in the Eurovision Song Contest 2014
- Gromee – DJ, record producer, remixer, songwriter, Polish representative in the Eurovision Song Contest 2018

Semi-final 2 – 13 September 2020
Draw	Artist	Song	Result
1	Aleksandra Kędra	"Perfect"	Honourable mention
2	Natalia Kosmowska	"Can't Stop the Feeling!"	Eliminated
3	Sandra Wawer	"No Roots"	Honourable mention
4	Maja Biernat	"Hold Back the River"	Eliminated
5	Agata Serwin	"What Makes You Beautiful"	Finalist
6	Zuzanna Darnikowska	"Be the One"	Eliminated
7	Maja Janowska	"Budapest"	Eliminated

===== Semi-final 3 =====
The third semi-final was broadcast on 20 September 2020. All seven semi-finaliats performed songs from fairytales. The jury consisted of three members:

- Marina Łuczenko-Szczęsna – singer, songwriter, actress
- Dawid Kwiatkowski – singer-songwriter
- Kasia Łaska – singer, voice actress

Semi-final 3 – 20 September 2020
Draw	Artist	Song	Result
1	Ala Tracz	"Kolorowy wiatr"	Finalist
2	Lena Małodzińska	"Mam tę moc"	Eliminated
3	Szymon Lubicki	"Ani słowa"	Honourable mention
4	Antonina Piotrowska	"Ty druha we mnie masz"	Honourable mention
5	Konrad Repiński	"Większy świat"	Eliminated
6	Anna Laskowska	"Miłość rośnie wokół nas"	Eliminated
7	Dominika Głąb	"Pół kroku stąd"	Eliminated

==== Final ====
The final was held on 27 September 2020. Three artists competed in the final, and the winning artist and song represented Poland in the Junior Eurovision Song Contest 2020. The jury consisted of three members: Konrad Smuga (director of Polish performances at Junior Eurovision), Grzegorz Urban (music director of Szansa na Sukces), and Anna Cyzowska-Andura (director of the TVP Entertainment Agency). Another panel, consisting of Viki Gabor, Cleo and Dawid Kwiatkowski was also present during the show, but did not have any power over the voting. The winner was Ala Tracz with the song "I'll Be Standing", which was composed by Gromee and Sara Chmiel-Gromala.

Final – 27 September 2020
Artist	Draw	Cover	Draw	JESC song	Jury	Televote	Total	Place
Lena Marzec	1	"Superhero"	4	"You and Me"	3	3	6	2
Agata Serwin	2	"Can't Stop the Feeling!"	5	"What I'm Made Of"	1	1	2	3
Ala Tracz	3	"Mam tę moc"	6	"I'll Be Standing"	5	5	10	1

== At Junior Eurovision ==
During the opening ceremony and the running order draw, which both took place on 23 November 2020, Poland was drawn to perform sixth on 29 November 2020, following Belarus and preceding Georgia.

=== Voting ===
The same voting system that was introduced in the 2017 edition was used, where the results were determined by 50% online voting and 50% jury voting. Every participating broadcaster assembled a national jury that consisted of three music industry professionals and two children aged between 10 and 15 who were citizens of the country they represented. The rankings of those jurors were combined to make an overall top ten.

The online voting consisted of two phases. The first phase of the online voting began on 27 November 2020 when a recap of all the rehearsal performances was shown on the contest's website Junioreurovision.tv before the viewers could vote. After this, voters also had the option to watch longer one-minute clips from each participant's rehearsal. This first round of voting ended on 29 November at 15:59 CET. The second phase of the online voting took place during the live show and began right after the last performance and was open for 15 minutes. International viewers were able to vote for three songs. They were also able to vote for their own country's song. These votes were then turned into points which were determined by the percentage of votes received. For example, if a song received 10% of the votes, it received 10% of the available points.

Points awarded to Poland
Score	Country
12 points	
10 points	
8 points	Georgia; Malta; Serbia
7 points	
6 points	Kazakhstan
5 points	Netherlands
4 points	Russia
3 points	
2 points	Belarus; Germany; Spain
1 point	France
Poland received 44 points from the online vote

Points awarded by Poland
Score	Country
12 points	Belarus
10 points	Ukraine
8 points	Netherlands
7 points	Spain
6 points	Malta
5 points	Georgia
4 points	Russia
3 points	Kazakhstan
2 points	Germany
1 point	France

==== Detailed voting results ====
The following members comprised the Polish jury:

- Ada Kućmierz
- Agata Serwin
- Lena Marzec
- Norbi
- Oliwia Stefanowska

Detailed voting results from Poland
Draw	Country	Juror A	Juror B	Juror C	Juror D	Juror E	Rank	Points
01	Germany	3	7	9	11	11	9	2
02	Kazakhstan	5	6	8	10	8	8	3
03	Netherlands	4	3	2	3	3	3	8
04	Serbia	6	11	11	9	10	11	
05	Belarus	7	2	1	1	1	1	12
06	Poland							
07	Georgia	8	9	5	4	6	6	5
08	Malta	9	1	6	7	9	5	6
09	Russia	10	10	7	5	5	7	4
10	Spain	2	4	4	8	4	4	7
11	Ukraine	1	5	3	2	2	2	10
12	France	11	8	10	6	7	10	1
