= Junior Eurovision Song Contest 2021 =

International song competition for youth

- Imagine

Date and venue
- Final: 19 December 2021
- Venue: La Seine Musicale; Paris, France

Organisation
- Organiser: European Broadcasting Union (EBU)
- Executive supervisor: Martin Österdahl

Production
- Host broadcaster: France Télévisions
- Directors: Julian Gutierrez; Franck Broqua
- Executive producer: Alexandra Redde-Amiel
- Presenters: Carla; Élodie Gossuin; Olivier Minne

Participants
- Number of entries: 19
- Returning countries: Albania; Armenia; Azerbaijan; Bulgaria; Ireland; Italy; North Macedonia; Portugal
- Non-returning countries: Belarus
- Participation map: Competing countries Countries that participated in the past but not in 2021

Vote
- Voting system: The professional jury of each country awards a set of 12, 10, 8–1 points to 10 songs. Viewers around the world vote for 3 songs, and their votes are distributed proportionally. The votes of the jury and the audience make up 50% of all votes.
- Winning song: Armenia "Qami Qami"

The Junior Eurovision Song Contest 2021 was the 19th edition of the Junior Eurovision Song Contest, held on 19 December 2021 at La Seine Musicale in Paris, France, and presented by Carla, Élodie Gossuin, and Olivier Minne. It was organised by the European Broadcasting Union (EBU) and host broadcaster France Télévisions, who staged the event after winning the 2020 contest for France with the song "J'imagine" by Valentina. This was the first time the contest was held in France, as well as the first Eurovision event to be held in the country since Eurovision Young Dancers 1999 in Lyon and the first to be held in Paris since Eurovision Young Dancers 1989.

Broadcasters from nineteen countries participated in the contest, with Albania, Armenia, Ireland, Italy, North Macedonia, and Portugal all returning after their absence from the previous edition. Azerbaijan and Bulgaria returned after two and four-year absences respectively. For the first time in 19 editions, Belarus did not participate, as the country's broadcaster is indefinitely suspended from the EBU, making the Netherlands the only country to have participated every year since the contest's first edition in 2003.

The winner was Armenia with the song "Qami Qami" by Maléna. This was Armenia's second victory in the contest, having last won in 2010. Poland, host country France, Georgia, and Azerbaijan completed the top five, with Azerbaijan recording its highest placement to date. The Netherlands finished in last place for the first time, while Ireland and Spain also achieved their lowest placings to date, the latter finishing outside the top five for the first time.

== Location ==
La Seine Musicale, venue of the Junior Eurovision Song Contest 2021

On 9 December 2020, it was announced that the contest would take place in France in 2021. The contest was held on 19 December, which to date remains the latest it has ever occurred in any year; prior to this, the last instance of the contest being held in December was 2012. The selected venue for the contest was the 6,000-seat La Seine Musicale, which serves as concert hall and performing arts center. The centre is located on Île Seguin in Boulogne-Billancourt, a commune in the western suburbs of Paris.

=== Bidding phase and host city selection ===
Location of the selected host city (in blue)

Unlike the adult Eurovision Song Contest, the winning country originally did not receive the automatic rights to host the next edition. However, for the contests since 2011 (with the exceptions of 2012 and 2018), the winning country has had first refusal on hosting the next competition. Italy used this clause in 2015 to decline to host the contest after their victory in 2014. On 15 October 2017, the EBU announced a return to the original system in 2018, to help provide broadcasters with a greater amount of time to prepare, and to ensure the continuation of the contest into the future.

On 9 December 2020, it was confirmed by the EBU that France, having won the 2020 contest, would host the 2021 contest. The French Head of Delegation Alexandra Redde-Amiel had previously stated that France Télévisions was keen to host the contest. Spanish broadcaster Radiotelevisión Española (RTVE) had also expressed interest in hosting had it won in 2020.

On 20 May 2021, during a press conference held by France Télévisions and the EBU, it was confirmed that the contest would be held in La Seine Musicale in Paris. It was the second consecutive time the contest was held in a capital city. Le Parisien reported in September 2021 that the broadcaster had looked into the possibility of organising the contest in Cannes or Nice before settling on the metropolitan area of Paris as a precaution against the COVID-19 pandemic, and that Paris La Défense Arena was considered a potential venue in a 8,000-seat configuration before La Seine Musicale was named the chosen venue.

== Participants ==
On 2 September 2021, 19 countries were confirmed to be participating in the contest, equaling the number of participating countries from 2019. Albania, Armenia, Ireland, Italy, North Macedonia and Portugal all returned after one-year absences, while Azerbaijan and Bulgaria returned after two and four-year absences respectively. For the first time since the contest's inception, Belarus did not participate, as the country's broadcaster BTRC is in the midst of an indefinite suspension from the EBU. This made it the first edition since the 2004 contest to not see any of the previous year's participating countries withdraw voluntarily, as well as the first since 2018 to see the number of participating countries actively increase from the year before.

The Russian representative, Tanya Mezhentseva, had participated in the Junior Eurovision Song Contest before; she represented Russia in 2019 along with Denberel Oorzhak, finishing in 13th place with the song "A Time for Us". This is only the third case (all of whom have been from Russia) in the competition to feature a returning artist from previous editions after Katya Ryabova (Russia 2009 and 2011) and Lerika (Moldova 2011 and Russia 2012). The Armenian representative, Maléna, was set to participate in 2020 with the song "Why" before Armenia withdrew from the competition.

Prior to the event, a digital compilation album featuring all the songs from the 2021 contest was put together by the European Broadcasting Union and released by Universal Music Group on 3 December 2021.

Participants of the Junior Eurovision Song Contest 2021
Country	Broadcaster	Artist	Song	Language	Songwriter(s)
Albania	RTSH	Anna Gjebrea	"Stand by You"	Albanian, English	Gannin Arnold; Endi Cuci; Anna Gjebrea; Sani M'airura; Adam Watts
Armenia	AMPTV	Maléna	"Qami Qami" (Քամի Քամի)	Armenian, English	Arpine Martoyan; Vahram Petrosyan; David Badalyan; David Tserunyan
Azerbaijan	İTV	Sona Azizova	"One of Those Days"	Azerbaijani, English	Sona Azizova; Maria Broberg; Hampus Eurenius; Francisco Faria; Javid Shahbazbayov; Martin Wiik
Bulgaria	BNT	Denislava and Martin	"Voice of Love"	Bulgarian, English	Vasil Garvanliev; Vesna Malinova; Stan Stefanov; Davor Yordanovski
France	France Télévisions	Enzo	"Tic Tac"	French	Léa Ivanne; Alban Lico
Georgia	GPB	Niko Kajaia	"Let's Count the Smiles"	Georgian, French, English	Giga Kukhianidze
Germany	Kika	Pauline	"Imagine Us"	German, English	Torben Brüggemann; Alex Henke; Ricardo Munoz; Patrick Salmy
Ireland	TG4	Maiú Levi Lawlor	"Saor (Disappear)"	Irish	Anna Banks; Brendan McCarthy; Cyprian Cassar; Lesley Ann Halve; Niall Mooney; Lauren White Murphy
Italy	RAI	Elisabetta Lizza	"Specchio (Mirror on the Wall)"	Italian, English	Franco Fasano; Marco Iardella; Fabrizio Palaferri; Stefano Rigamonti
Kazakhstan	KA	Alinur Khamzin and Beknur Zhanibekuly	"Ertegı älemı (Fairy World)" (Ертегі әлемі)	Kazakh, French	Gabriel Boileau Cloutier; Nurbolat Qanay
Malta	PBS	Ike and Kaya	"My Home"	English	Cyprian Cassar; Owen Leuellen; Matt "Muxu" Mercieca
Netherlands	AVROTROS	Ayana	"Mata sugu aō ne" (またすぐ会おうね)	Dutch, English	Ferry Lagendijk
North Macedonia	MRT	Dajte Muzika	"Green Forces"	Macedonian, English	Robert Bilbilov; Robin Zimbakov
Poland	TVP	Sara James	"Somebody"	Polish, English	Jan Bielecki; Dominik Buczkowski-Wojtaszek; Patryk Kumór; Tom Martin
Portugal	RTP	Simão Oliveira	"O rapaz"	Portuguese	Diogo Clemente; Fernando Daniel
Russia	VGTRK	Tanya Mezhentseva	"Mon ami"	Russian, English	Danu Boian; Alexander Brashovyan; Dmitriy Korochin; Tanya Mezhentseva
Serbia	RTS	Jovana and Dunja	"Oči deteta (Children's Eyes)" (Очи детета)	Serbian	Ana Frlin
Spain	RTVE	Levi Díaz	"Reír"	Spanish	David Roma
Ukraine	UA:PBC	Olena Usenko	"Vazhil" (Важіль)	Ukrainian	Kateryna Komar; Olena Usenko

== Production ==
=== Impact of the COVID-19 pandemic ===
Several measures were taken by the organisers in response to the COVID-19 pandemic, particularly the spread of the Omicron variant. Although the live show was held with a full capacity audience wearing masks, the jury show, which took place on 18 December, was held without an audience. The opening ceremony, which took place on 13 December, was held without delegations attending.

In preparation for the event, the EBU had been considering three scenarios in which the contest could be held, which were announced on 24 August. The three scenarios include:

- The event is held with no restrictions, as it was before the COVID-19 pandemic began (scenario A).
- The event is held with social distancing measures in place (scenario B). The Eurovision Song Contest 2021 was held in this scenario.
- Providing the option for acts to compete with their music video if they are unable to travel to Paris (scenario C, which was the option used by Australia in the Eurovision Song Contest 2021) or to compete with a rehearsal recording if they are unable to compete in the televised show (this was the option used by Iceland in the Eurovision Song Contest 2021).

=== Presenters ===
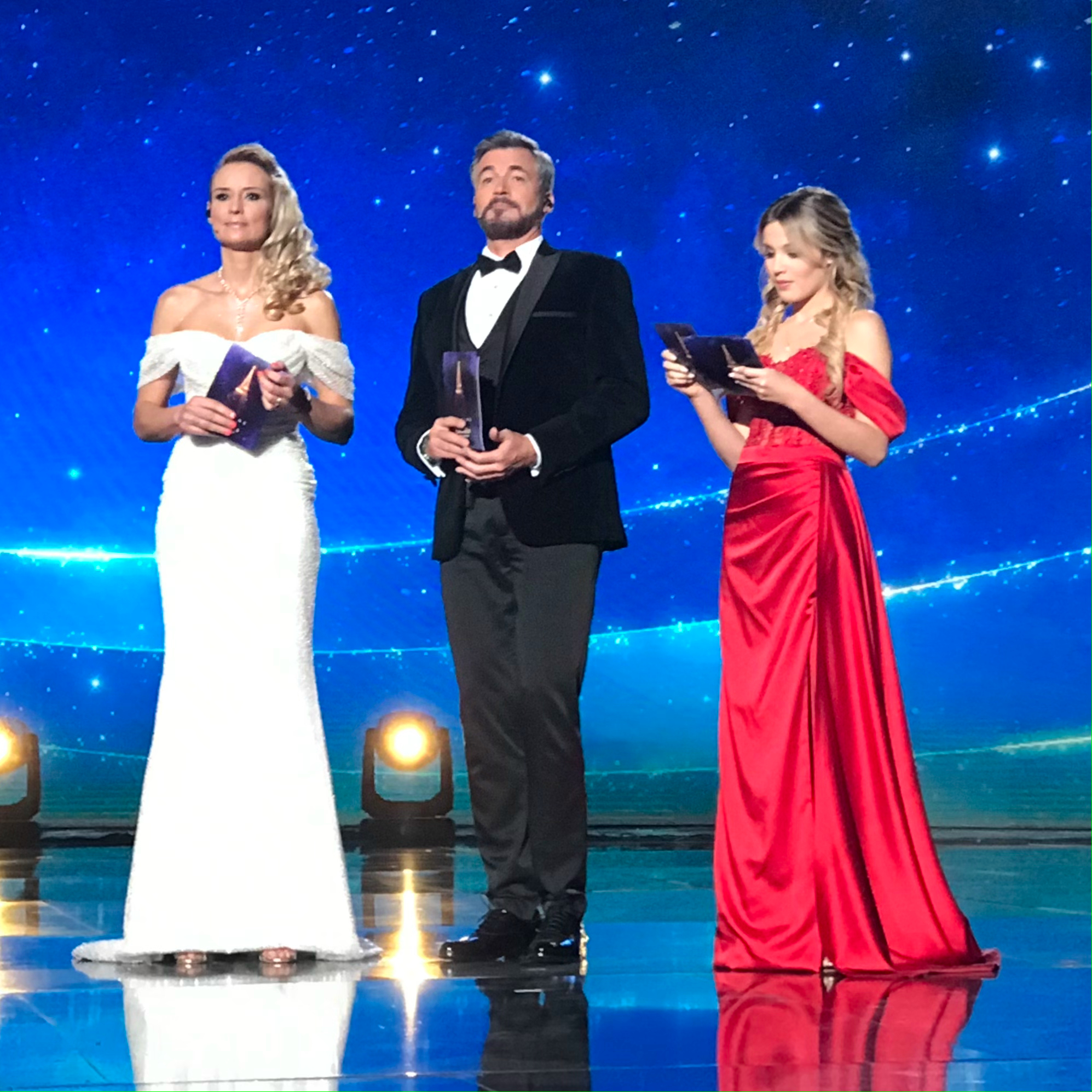
Presenters from left to right: Élodie Gossuin, Olivier Minne and Carla.

Carla, Élodie Gossuin and Olivier Minne were the presenters of the show. Carla was also the French entrant in the Junior Eurovision Song Contest 2019. The hosts were revealed during a press conference on 17 November.

=== Visual design ===
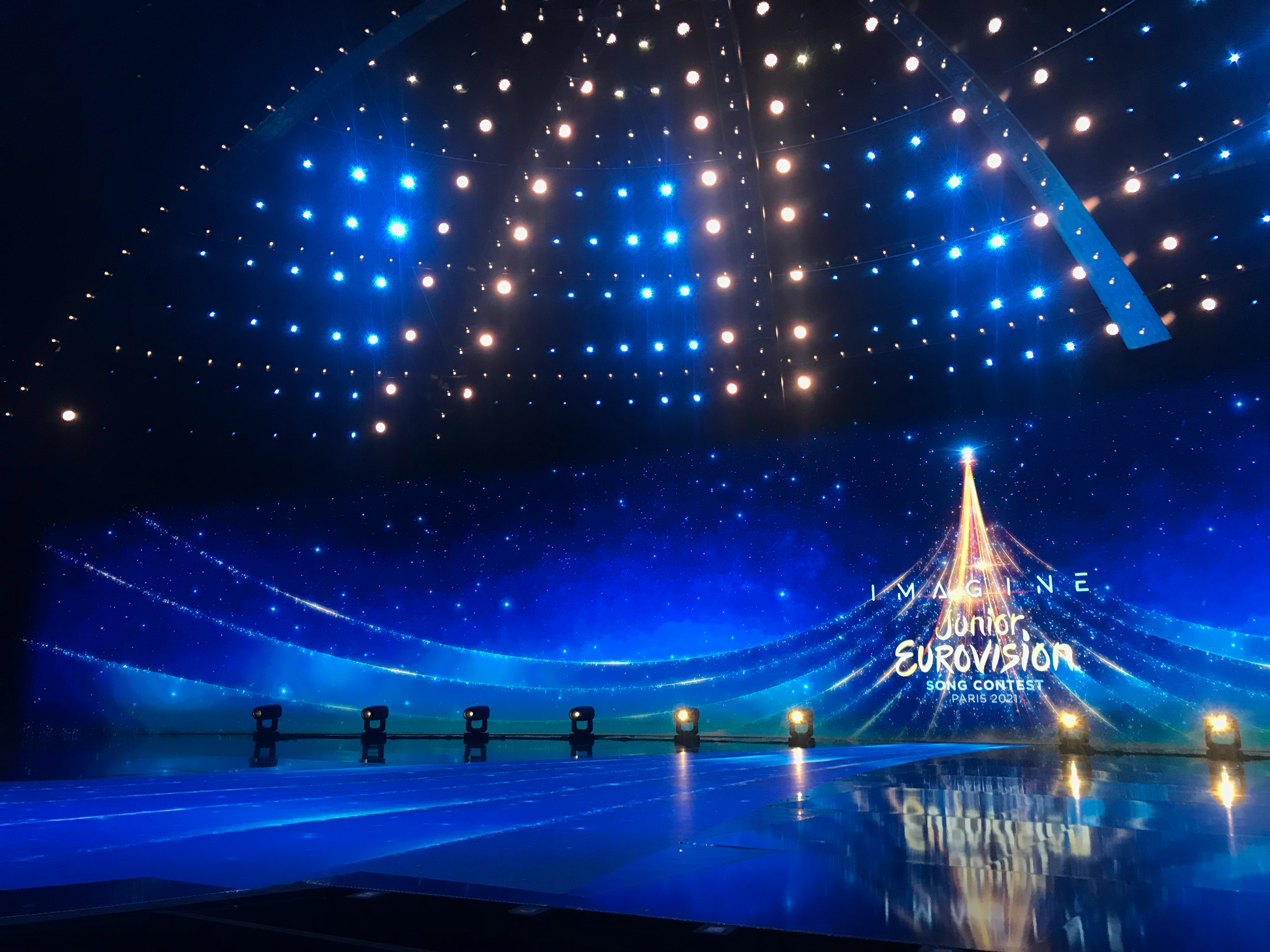
The stage of the Junior Eurovision Song Contest 2021

The slogan for the contest, Imagine, was revealed on 20 May 2021 during a press conference prior to the Eurovision Song Contest 2021 in Rotterdam, Netherlands. The slogan was chosen as a reference to the previous year's winning song "J'imagine", as well as a way to encourage children to be creative and pursue their dreams.

The official logo and theme artwork for the contest was unveiled on 24 August 2021. The artwork was inspired by three themes: imagination, Christmas and the Eiffel Tower.

=== Postcards ===
Contestants were featured in "postcard" video introductions, set in a different location in Paris, or surrounding areas in France. Each began with a short clip of the upcoming performer flying over the skies of Paris via green screen, followed by an extended sequence involving dance troupes dancing in a specific Parisian location. Following that, a stream of light in the colours of the upcoming country's flag entered La Seine Musicale, and the upcoming participant's face was projected onto the exterior of the venue, signalling the beginning of the upcoming performance.

- Albania – Palais Garnier
- Armenia – Galerie Vivienne
- Azerbaijan – Musée Grévin
- Bulgaria – La Samaritaine
- France – Louvre
- Georgia – Pont de Bir-Hakeim
- Germany – Musée des Arts Forains
- Ireland – Eiffel Tower
- Italy – Panthéon
- Kazakhstan – Palace of Versailles
- Malta – Institut du Monde Arabe
- Netherlands – L'Espace Niemeyer
- North Macedonia – Galeries Lafayette
- Poland – Pont des Arts
- Portugal – Folies Bergère
- Russia – Château de Chantilly
- Serbia – Musée Condé
- Spain – Sacré-Cœur, Paris
- Ukraine – Musée d'Art Moderne de Paris

== Contest overview ==
The event took place on 19 December 2021 at 16:00 CET. Nineteen countries participated, with the running order published on 13 December 2021. All the countries competing were eligible to vote with the jury vote, as well as participating and non-participating countries under an aggregated international online vote, eligible to vote. Armenia won with 224 points, also winning the online vote. Poland came second with 218 points, with France (who won the jury vote), Georgia, and Azerbaijan completing the top five. Spain, Bulgaria, Germany, Ireland, and the Netherlands occupied the bottom five positions.

The opening of the show featured the traditional flag parade, accompanied by French DJ duo Ofenbach performing a medley of their discography. During the interval, Valentina performed a Christmas version of her winning song "J'imagine". All participants then joined on stage for a rendition of the common song, "Imagine". Barbara Pravi closed the interval with "Voilà", her entry for France in the Eurovision Song Contest 2021.

R/O	Country	Artist	Song	Points	Place
1	Germany	Pauline	"Imagine Us"	61	17
2	Georgia	Niko Kajaia	"Let's Count the Smiles"	163	4
3	Poland	Sara James	"Somebody"	218	2
4	Malta	Ike and Kaya	"My Home"	97	12
5	Italy	Elisabetta Lizza	"Specchio (Mirror on the Wall)"	107	10
6	Bulgaria	Denislava and Martin	"Voice of Love"	77	16
7	Russia	Tanya Mezhentseva	"Mon ami"	124	7
8	Ireland	Maiú Levi Lawlor	"Saor (Disappear)"	44	18
9	Armenia	Maléna	"Qami Qami"	224	1
10	Kazakhstan	Alinur Khamzin and Beknur Zhanibekuly	"Ertegı älemı (Fairy World)"	121	8
11	Albania	Anna Gjebrea	"Stand By You"	84	14
12	Ukraine	Olena Usenko	"Vazhil"	125	6
13	France	Enzo	"Tic Tac"	187	3
14	Azerbaijan	Sona Azizova	"One of Those Days"	151	5
15	Netherlands	Ayana	"Mata sugu aō ne"	43	19
16	Spain	Levi Díaz	"Reír"	77	15
17	Serbia	Jovana and Dunja	"Oči deteta (Children's Eyes)"	86	13
18	North Macedonia	Dajte Muzika	"Green Forces"	114	9
19	Portugal	Simão Oliveira	"O rapaz"	101	11

=== Spokespersons ===
The 12 points from the juries were announced live by a spokesperson from each country. Countries that did not provide their own spokesperson had their 12 points announced by a local student from Paris.

1. Germany – Venetia
2. Georgia – Sandra Gadelia
3. Poland – Matylda
4. Malta – Eden
5. Italy – Céleste
6. Bulgaria – Arianne
7. Russia – Liza Gureeva
8. Ireland – Rueben Levi Hackett
9. Armenia – Karina Ignatyan
10. Kazakhstan – Zere
11. Albania – Alex
12. Ukraine – Oleksandr Balabanov
13. France – Angélina
14. Azerbaijan – Suleyman
15. Netherlands – Matheu
16. Spain – Lucía Arcos
17. Serbia – Katie
18. North Macedonia – Fendi
19. Portugal – Manon

== Detailed voting results ==
Split results
Place	Combined		Jury		Online vote	
Place	Country	Points	Country	Points	Country	Points
1	Armenia	224	France	120	Armenia	109
2	Poland	218	Poland	116	Poland	102
3	France	187	Armenia	115	Portugal	92
4	Georgia	163	Azerbaijan	109	France	67
5	Azerbaijan	151	Georgia	104	Ukraine	63
6	Ukraine	125	Russia	74	Serbia	62
7	Russia	124	Kazakhstan	64	Georgia; North Macedonia	59
8	Kazakhstan	121	Ukraine	62	Georgia; North Macedonia	59
9	North Macedonia	114	Italy	60	Kazakhstan	57
10	Italy	107	North Macedonia	55	Malta; Russia	50
11	Portugal	101	Malta	47	Malta; Russia	50
12	Malta	97	Albania	45	Italy; Spain	47
13	Serbia	86	Bulgaria	39	Italy; Spain	47
14	Albania	84	Spain	30	Germany	46
15	Spain	77 (Note: Despite finishing with the same number of points as Bulgaria, Spain is deemed to have finished in fifteenth place due to receiving a greater number of points in the online vote.)	Serbia	24	Azerbaijan	42
16	Bulgaria	77	Germany	15	Albania; Ireland	39
17	Germany	61	Netherlands	9	Albania; Ireland	39
18	Ireland	44	Portugal	9	Bulgaria	38
19	Netherlands	43	Ireland	5	Netherlands	34

Detailed voting results
Voting procedure used: 100% jury vote 100% online vote		Total score	Jury vote score	Online vote score	Jury vote																		
Voting procedure used: 100% jury vote 100% online vote		Total score	Jury vote score	Online vote score	Germany	Georgia	Poland	Malta	Italy	Bulgaria	Russia	Ireland	Armenia	Kazakhstan	Albania	Ukraine	France	Azerbaijan	Netherlands	Spain	Serbia	North Macedonia	Portugal
Contestants	Germany	61	15	46								4		4							5		2
Contestants	Georgia	163	104	59				12	7	5	3		12	8	2	6	12	7	5	2	10	8	5
Contestants	Poland	218	116	102	12	4		10	8	6	1	12	1	5	4	10	2	3	10	8	7	5	8
Contestants	Malta	97	47	50	6	8	2		2		2		3	3		8		4		1		4	4
Contestants	Italy	107	60	47		6	5	6		8		8			10		6	1	6	4			
Contestants	Bulgaria	77	39	38		3		3	10		5	3			3			5				1	6
Contestants	Russia	124	74	50	5		4	1		3			7	12	7		1	12	3	3	4	12	
Contestants	Ireland	44	5	39					5														
Contestants	Armenia	224	115	109	10	5	12	5		2	6	7		6	6	7	10		7	10	8	2	12
Contestants	Kazakhstan	121	64	57	3	1	7	7	1	1	12		4			4	7	8		6	2		1
Contestants	Albania	84	45	39	4		1				7	6	8				8		1			10	
Contestants	Ukraine	125	62	63	7		8			12		10	2				3	6	2	12			
Contestants	France	187	120	67	8	12	6	8	3	10	4		10	7	8				12	7	12	6	7
Contestants	Azerbaijan	151	109	42	2	10	10	2	12	7	10	1		10	1	12			8	5	6	3	10
Contestants	Netherlands	43	9	34					4					1		3					1		
Contestants	Spain	77	30	47	1		3						6	2	5		4	2	4				3
Contestants	Serbia	86	24	62		7			6			2				2						7	
Contestants	North Macedonia	114	55	59		2					8	5	5		12	5	5	10			3		
Contestants	Portugal	101	9	92				4		4						1							

Below is a summary of all 12 points received from each country's professional juries.

N.	Contestant	Nation(s) giving 12 points
3	France	Georgia, Netherlands, Serbia
3	Georgia	Armenia, France, Malta
3	Russia	Azerbaijan, Kazakhstan, North Macedonia
2	Armenia	Poland, Portugal
2	Azerbaijan	Italy, Ukraine
2	Poland	Germany, Ireland
2	Ukraine	Bulgaria, Spain
1	Kazakhstan	Russia
1	North Macedonia	Albania

=== Online voting ===
According to the EBU, a total of over 4.3 million valid votes were received during the voting windows.

Online voting results
Country	Points	Estimated votes based on points
Armenia	109	~425,000
Poland	102	~398,000
Portugal	92	~359,000
France	67	~261,000
Ukraine	63	~246,000
Serbia	62	~242,000
Georgia	59	~230,000
North Macedonia	59	~230,000
Kazakhstan	57	~222,000
Malta	50	~195,000
Russia	50	~195,000
Italy	47	~183,000
Spain	47	~183,000
Germany	46	~179,000
Azerbaijan	42	~164,000
Albania	39	~152,000
Ireland	39	~152,000
Bulgaria	38	~148,000
Netherlands	34	~133,000

== Broadcasts ==
Broadcasts in participating countries
Country	Broadcaster(s)	Channel(s)	Commentator(s)	Ref.
Albania	RTSH	RTSH 1, RTSH Muzikë, Radio Tirana 1	Andri Xhahu	
Armenia	AMPTV	1TV	Arman Margaryan and Hrachuhi Utmazyan	
Azerbaijan	İTV		Unknown	
Bulgaria	BNT	BNT 1, BNT 4	Elena Rosberg and Petko Kralev	
France	France Télévisions	France 2	Stéphane Bern and Laurence Boccolini	
Georgia	GPB	First Channel	Nikoloz Lobiladze	
Germany	NDR, Kika	Kika	Constantin Zöller	
Ireland	TG4		Louise Cantillon	
Italy	Rai	Rai Gulp, RaiPlay	Mario Acampa, Marta Viola and Giorgia Boni	
Kazakhstan	Khabar Agency	Khabar TV	Kaldybek Zhaisanbai and Mahabbat Esen	
Malta	PBS	TVM	No commentary	
Netherlands	AVROTROS	NPO Zapp	Buddy Vedder	
North Macedonia	MRT	MRT 1	Eli Tanaskovska	
Poland	TVP	TVP1, TVP Polonia, TVP ABC	Marek Sierocki and Aleksander Sikora	
Portugal	RTP	RTP1, RTPi, RTPi Asia, RTPi America	Nuno Galopim	
Russia	C1R, VGTRK	Karousel	Anton Zorkin and Khryusha	
Serbia	RTS	RTS 2, RTS Svet	Tijana Lukić	
Spain	RTVE	La 1, TVE Internacional	Tony Aguilar and Julia Varela	
Ukraine	Suspilne	UA:Kultura	Viktor Diachenko	

Broadcasters and commentators in non-participating countries
Country	Broadcaster(s)	Channel(s)	Commentator(s)	Ref.
Iceland	RÚV	RÚV (Note: The show was broadcast on RÚV on a 2-hour and 45-minute delay)	Felix Bergsson	

Some countries rebroadcast the event several days later in late 2021 or early 2022 like Albania and Portugal during Christmas.

== See also ==
- Eurovision Song Contest 2021
