= L'autre moi =

- The cover of the standard version of the album. Réédition version features a purple tint.

Studio album by Carla
- Released: 5 June 2020
- Genre: Pop
- Length: 37:26
- Label: MCA
- Producer: Julien Comblat; Jérémy Chapron; Alain Corson; Boban Apostolov; Nino Vella; Fred Savio; Valentin Marceau; Alban Lico; Emilie Sattonet; Jean-Karl Lucas; Alban Ghnassia; Eddy Pradelles; Jean Baptiste Gnakouri; Sandro Abaldonato

Carla chronology
L'autre moi (2020)	Sans filtre (2021)

Singles from L'autre moi
- 1. "Bim bam toi" Released: 11 October 2019; 2. "L'autre moi" Released: 15 May 2020; 3. "Cœur sur toi" Released: 4 November 2020

"L'autre moi" (transl. "The Other Me") is the debut studio album by French singer Carla Lazzari, released on 5 June 2020, featuring her Junior Eurovision Song Contest 2019 entry, "Bim bam toi". The album contains 13 tracks.

== Background and promotion ==
L'autre moi was first announced by the artist on Instagram on 6 May 2020, stating that she would show her audience "her other self".

=== Singles ===
"Bim bam toi" (transl. "Bim Bam You") was released as the lead single, and the artists debut single, to the then-unannounced album on 11 October 2019 to represent France in the Junior Eurovision Song Contest 2019. It is an electropop track, performed in French. It was written by Barbara Pravi and Igit, and produced by Julien Comblat. The lyrics tells the story of love at first sight. The single premiered alongside a music video, which, since February 2020, is currently the most-viewed Junior Eurovision-related video on YouTube. At Junior Eurovision, the song performed second in the running order, and finished in fifth place with a total of 169 points.

"L'autre moi" (transl. "The Other Me"), the title track, was released as the second single of the album. The single was announced at the same time as the album. It is a pop track, written by Benjamin Samama and Jérémy Chapron, who also produced the track. The lyrics are about being herself, and not listening to what other people say. The music video to the track was released several weeks later, on 25 June 2020.

"Cœur sur toi" (transl. "Heart On You"), was released as the third single of the album, and the first single of the "Réédition" version of the album. It was released on 4 November 2020, followed by a music video on 9 December 2020. The lyrics are about not being afraid to be in love with someone.

=== Réédition version ===
On 4 December 2020, the "Réédition" version of the album was released, containing 6 new tracks, one of which, Noël blanc being a French language cover of White Christmas by Irving Berlin.

== Track listing ==
L'autre moi track listing
No.	Title	Writer(s)	Producer(s)	Length
1.	"Roller Coaster"	Barbara Pravi; Antoine Barrau	Julien Comblat	2:55
2.	"L'autre moi"	Benjamin Samama; Jérémy Chapron	Chapron	2:45
3.	"Bim bam toi"	Pravi; Barrau	Comblat	2:55
4.	"Dans ma bulle"	Alain Corson; Boban Apostolov	Corson; Apostolov	2:53
5.	"Batterie faible"	Barrau; Nino Vella	Comblat, Vella	2:31
6.	"Mon cœur fait"	Fred Savio; Freddie Marche	Savio	2:44
7.	"Planète à louer"	Arnaud Kerane; La Tulipe Bleue	Comblat; Valentin Marceau	2:49
8.	"Mon amour"	Samama; Chapron	Chapron	3:02
9.	"Avant"	Alban Lico	Lico	2:59
10.	"Je sais pas"	Romain Berrodier; Rose Keren	Chapron	2:44
11.	"On verra plus tard"	Pravi; Barrau; Momo Wang	Comblat	2:55
12.	"Laissez passer l'espoir" (With uncredited vocals from Jérémy Chapron)	Emilie Sattonet; Jean-Karl Lucas	Comblat; Sattonet; Lucas	2:55
13.	"Merci la vie"	François Welgryn; William Rousseau	Comblat	3:12
Total length:				37:26

Réédition (bonus disc)
No.	Title	Writer(s)	Producer(s)	Length
1.	"Cœur sur toi"	Alban Ghnassia; Rodrigue Janois	Ghnassia	3:04
2.	"Et je danse"	Samama; Chapron	Chapron	2:51
3.	"Pas folle"	Pravi; Eddy Pradelles; Laura Guenassia; Sandra Nicolle	Pradelles; Comblat	2:34
4.	"Aujourd'hui j'arrête"	Pravi; Jean Baptiste Gnakouri; Léandre Pick; Nicolle; Yannick Séri	Gnakouri	3:04
5.	"Ça va trop vite"	Claude Boisseau; Sandro Abaldonato	Abaldonato; Comblat	2:44
6.	"Noël blanc" (Irving Berlin cover)	Irving Berlin	Chapron	2:48
Total length:				54:34

== Charts ==
Chart (2020)	Peak position
Belgian Albums (Ultratop Wallonia)	148
French Albums (SNEP)	38

== Release history ==
Country	Date	Format	Version	Label
Various	5 June 2020	Digital download; streaming; CD	Standard	MCA
Various	4 December 2020	Digital download; streaming; CD	Réédition	MCA
