= Valentina (French singer) =

French singer (born 2009)

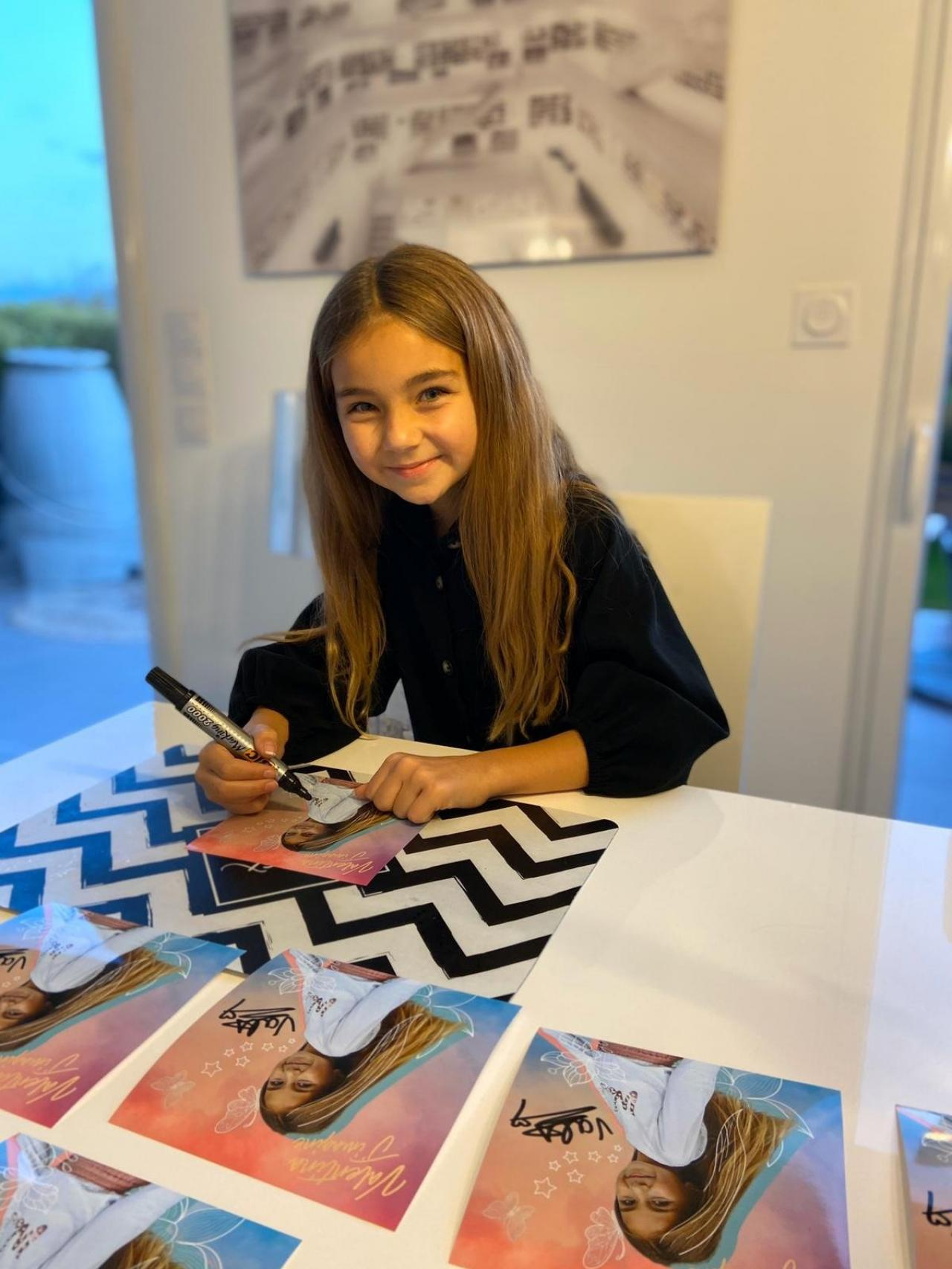
- Valentina in 2020

Background information
- Born: Valentina Tronel; 6 April 2009 (age 17); Rennes, France
- Genres: Chanson; French pop
- Occupation: Singer
- Instrument: Vocals
- Years active: 2017–present
- Labels: M6 Interactions; Sony Music France

Valentina Tronel (born 6 April 2009), known mononymously as Valentina, is a French singer. She rose to prominence after she won Junior Eurovision Song Contest 2020, becoming the first French entrant to win the contest. Previously, in 2017, she took part in the French version of The Voice Kids. Between 2018 and 2021, she was part of the child pop group Kids United Nouvelle Génération.

== Early life ==
Valentina was born in Rennes, the capital of Brittany, northwestern France, and lives in Thorigné-Fouillard. She has an older brother. Her mother is an Italian-language teacher and her father is a real estate agent.

From her early childhood, Valentina was "surrounded by music"; she said; "I grew up in a family where everyone sang: my mother [sang] in bars, my father [did] Michael Jackson impressions. [...] Music has always been part of my life." She said she was probably two and a half when she sang her first song. Her mother sang her to sleep with Italian songs and the first songs Valentina sang were Italian.

== Career ==
In 2017, Valentina took part in the fourth season of The Voice Kids France, but she was rejected at the blind auditions stage. Valentina was the show's youngest contestant that season, she was seven when she applied for the show and when her blind audition was recorded, and eight on 2 September, when the show was broadcast.

In 2018, Valentina joined the child musical group Kids United Nouvelle Génération, which is a "new generation" of the group Kids United. According to Le Figaro, her offer of a place there was due to her appearance on The Voice Kids, but according to Valentina, she and her mother sent a video of Valentina singing Kids United songs in response to an Internet advertisement for a music project; they later discovered the advertisement was for Kids United Nouvelle Génération and that Valentina had been selected for the second round.

As its youngest member, Valentina became a mascot for the group. As of 2020, she has recorded two albums with the group; Au bout de nos rêves was released in August 2018 and L'Hymne de la vie in November 2019. The group disbanded in 2021.

She has also been the voice actress of Liberty in the French adaptations of Paw Patrol: The Movie in 2021 and Paw Patrol: The Mighty Movie in 2023.

=== Junior Eurovision Song Contest ===
On 9 October 2020, France Télévisions announced it had selected Valentina to represent France with a song titled "J'imagine" at the Junior Eurovision Song Contest, which was held in Warsaw, Poland, on 29 November. On 16 October, the song was released as a single and a music video was unveiled on the same day. As of 20 October 2024, the video has received 31 million views. Valentina won the contest with a score of 200 points, 48 more than second-placed Kazakhstan. This was France's first victory at the contest.

In December 2022, she was selected as the spokesperson to announce the French jury results in the Junior Eurovision Song Contest 2022 that would be held in Yerevan, Armenia.

== Musical style and influences ==
Valentina's idol is Ariana Grande, who she said "has a wonderful voice". Her favorite of Grande's songs is "Love Me Harder". Valentina is also fond of the music of Celine Dion, Dadju, Maître Gims, Nolwenn Leroy, Louane, Patrick Fiori. Apart from singing, Valentina also raps in French. She also sings in Italian, in particular songs by her mother's favorite singer Laura Pausini. At her blind audition for The Voice Kids in 2016, Valentina performed Laura Pausini's "Tra te e il mare".

== Discography ==
=== Albums ===
Title	Details	Charts
Title	Details	FR
Plus loin qu'un rêve	Released: 10 September 2021; Label: Play Two (M6 Interactions); Format: CD, digital download, streaming	24
Plus loin qu'un rêve (Édition de Noël)	Released: 3 December 2021; Label: Play Two (M6 Interactions); Format: CD, digital download, streaming	24
La magie de Noël	Released: 3 November 2023; Label: Back2Bellum & Valentina Music (SME); Format: CD, digital download, streaming	45
L'amour c'est pour les autres	Released: 14 February 2025; Label: Back2Bellum & Valentina Music (SME); Format: CD, LP, digital download, streaming	102

=== Singles ===
Year	Title	Album
2020	"J'imagine"	Plus loin qu'un rêve
2021	"Y'a pas que les grands qui rêvent"	Plus loin qu'un rêve
2022	"Où es-tu là"	Plus loin qu'un rêve
2022	"Problème"	Plus loin qu'un rêve
2022	"All I Want for Christmas Is You"	Plus loin qu'un rêve (Édition de Noël)
2023	"En vrai"	Non-album single
2023	"Last Christmas" ft. Viki Gabor & Petar Aničić	La magie de Noël
2023	"La magie de Noël"	La magie de Noël
2024	"Pas d'après"	L'amour c'est pour les autres
2024	"Dis-le moi"	L'amour c'est pour les autres
2024	"L'amour c'est pour les autres"	L'amour c'est pour les autres
2025	"T’es pas là"	L'amour c'est pour les autres
2025	"Un été"	L'amour c'est pour les autres

Awards and achievements
Preceded by Viki Gabor with "Superhero"	Winner of the Junior Eurovision Song Contest; 2020	Succeeded by Maléna with "Qami Qami"
Preceded by Carla with "Bim bam toi"	France in the Junior Eurovision Song Contest; 2020	Succeeded by Enzo with "Tic Tac"
