= Azerbaijan in the Junior Eurovision Song Contest =

- Junior Eurovision Song Contest
- Participating broadcaster: İctimai Television (İTV)

Participation summary
- Appearances: 5
- First appearance: 2012
- Last appearance: 2025
- Highest placement: 5th: 2021
- Participation history: 2012; 2013; 2014 – 2017; 2018; 2019; 2020; 2021; 2022; 2023; 2024; 2025
- For the most recent participation see Azerbaijan in the Junior Eurovision Song Contest 2025

Azerbaijan has been represented at the Junior Eurovision Song Contest since the tenth edition in 2012. The Azerbaijani participating broadcaster in the contest is İctimai Television (İTV). It originally used a national final format for its participation at the 2012 contest. Its first entry at the 2012 contest was "Girls and Boys (Dünya Sənindir)" by Omar & Suada, which finished in eleventh place out of twelve participating entries.

After participating for a second time in 2013 and finishing seventh, İTV withdrew from the contest in 2014 for unspecified reasons. It returned to participate in 2018 where it placed sixteenth in a field of twenty, before withdrawing once again for a further two years. It returned to the 2021 contest, internally selecting "One Of Those Days" by Sona Azizova. Azizova achieved Azerbaijan's highest placing to date, achieving fifth place in a field of 19.

İTV returned in 2025 where it placed fifteenth in a field of eighteen. The broadcaster opted against participating again in 2026.

== History ==
=== Pre-participation ===
İctimai Television initially intended make a debut for Azerbaijan in the Junior Eurovision Song Contest 2008 in Limassol, Cyprus and were set to participate, with the broadcaster to organise a national final order to select the country's representative. However, in October 2008 the broadcaster withdrew from participation, citing a lack of candidates for the national selection. İTV later paid a fine to the EBU for the late withdrawal, with the aim to participate the following year. After broadcasting the contest for the first time in 2007, the broadcaster did still screen the contest on its first public channel in 2008. İTV showed no public interest in participating in the Junior Eurovision Song Contest in 2009, but did broadcast the contest once again. In 2010, Vladimir Arzumanyan, a singer from Nagorno-Karabakh representing Armenia, won the contest. It was alleged by Armenian media outlets that the broadcast of the contest in Azerbaijan was interrupted when it became apparent that Armenia had won due to the strained political relations between the two countries. These claims were disputed by AMPTV director and Eurovision head of delegation Diana Mnatsakanyan, who also denied reports that the country was preparing to file a complaint with the EBU over the matter. She noted that the broadcaster did not know whether Azerbaijan even aired the contest at all, given that the country had not yet participated in the Junior Eurovision and had "no interest" in it at the time, and that reports about the alleged incident were limited to posts on Azerbaijani Internet forums. Azerbaijan showed no interest in participating in the 2011 contest in Yerevan, Armenia.

=== Participation ===
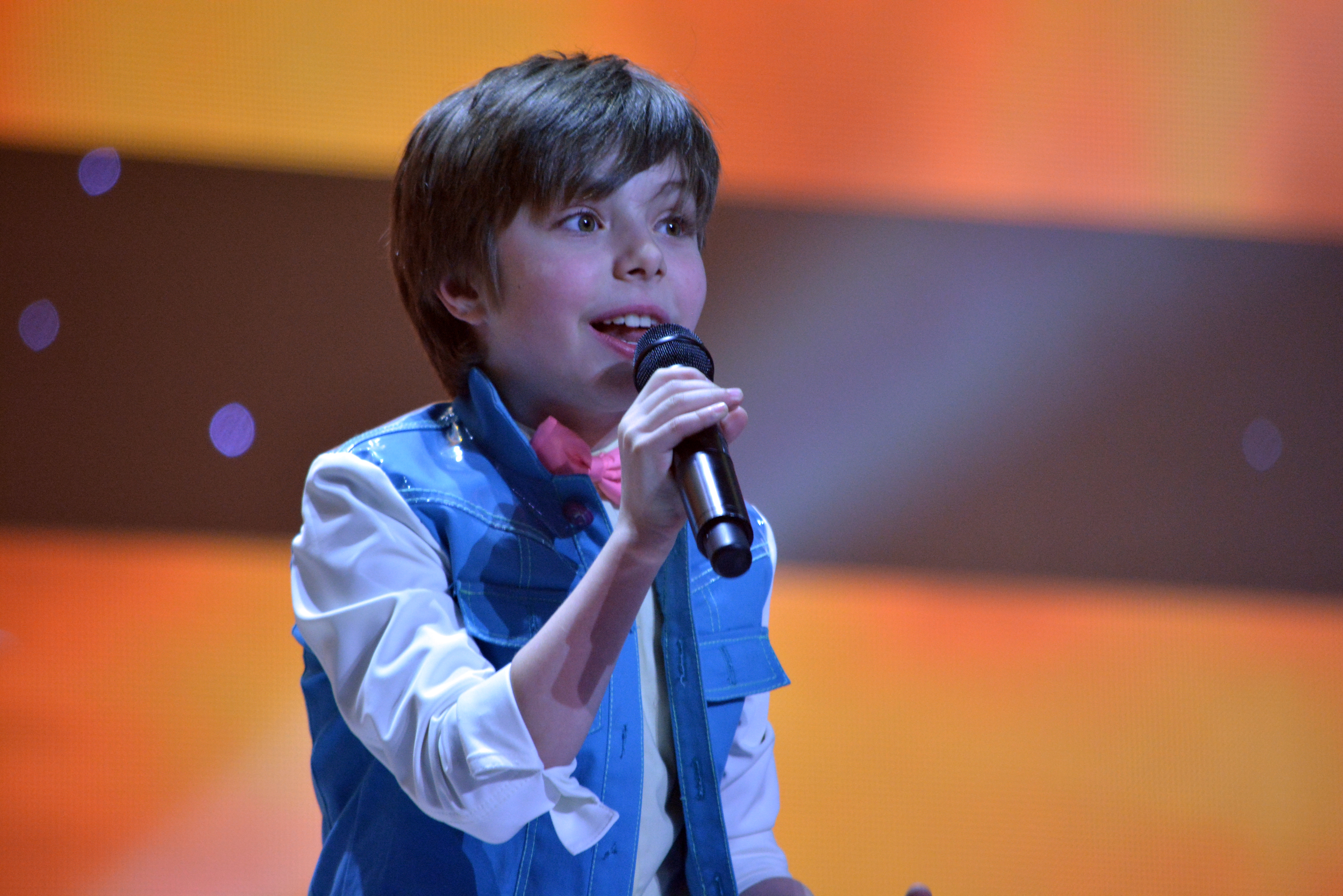
Rustam Karimov in Kyiv (2013)

In September 2012, İctimai Television officially confirmed that they would participate for the first time at the Junior Eurovision Song Contest 2012 in Amsterdam, the Netherlands. The broadcaster determined its debut representative via a national final in Baku on 9 October 2012. The event resulted in the selection Omar & Suada as a duet act for the country, with the song "Girls and Boys" internally selected by the broadcaster and released on 16 October 2012. The song was initially released fully in the English language, which went against the then-rules of the contest which stated that 75% of the track had to be performed in the native language of the country. The EBU gave İTV a two-day window to change the lyrics without disqualification. At the contest, Azerbaijan finished in 11th place out of 12 with 49 points.

Azerbaijan participated for a second time in the Junior Eurovision Song Contest 2013 in Kyiv, Ukraine. On 9 October 2013, it was reported that the Azerbaijani broadcaster İctimai Television decided to internally select their 2013 artist with auditions held in the Rashid Behbudov Second Music School in Baku. On 1 November 2013, İctimai revealed that 10-year-old Rustam Karimov would represent Azerbaijan. The title of the song was revealed to be "Me and My Guitar", and the song was presented to the public on 5 November 2013. Karimov finished in 7th place out of 12 with 66 points. Azerbaijan did not appear on the list of participating countries in the 2014 contest.

On 18 July 2018, Ivan Eismont, the Director General of BTRC (host broadcaster of the 2018 contest) stated that Azerbaijan were eager to participate in the Junior Eurovision Song Contest 2018 in Minsk, Belarus. The head of the Azerbaijani Junior Eurovision delegation later stated that while they wanted to return to the contest, participation was not yet confirmed. On 25 July 2018, İTV officially confirmed their return to the contest in 2018, as well as that their entry would be internally selected. Fidan Huseynova was officially announced as the third Azerbaijani representative on 18 September 2018, with the selected entry "I Wanna Be Like You" released on 16 October 2018. At the contest, Azerbaijan finished in 16th place out of 20 countries, with 47 points. The broadcaster withdrew after the 2018 contest.

In August 2021, İTV expressed their ambitions to return to the 2021 contest in Paris, France. On 16 August 2021, the broadcaster officially confirmed its return to the contest, as well as that Sona Azizova would represent the country. The broadcaster also opened a song submissions process for interested songwriters and composers to submit potential entries. These submissions were to be judged by a jury panel consisting of both Azerbaijani and international music experts to determine the nation's eventual entry. "One Of Those Days" was officially released as the Azerbaijani entry to the Junior Eurovision Song Contest 2021 on 17 November 2021. At the contest, Azizova achieved Azerbaijan's highest placing to date. The country placed 5th with 151 points, placing 4th with the professional juries and 15th in the online vote. During the Azerbaijani broadcast of the Junior Eurovision Song Contest 2021, commentators talked over the entirety of the performance of Maléna, the Armenian representative and eventual winner, which is in contravention with the rules of the contest. The EBU sought clarification from the Azerbaijani broadcaster İTV about the incident, but no response was received.

On 16 August 2025, İTV revealed that the country would return to the contest in 2025, which took place in Tbilisi, Georgia following a three-year absence. The country was represented by Yağmur with the song "Miau miau", which finished in 15th place with 66 points. In the same year, the Azerbaijani national jury awarded 3 points to the Armenian entrant, marking the first time in any Eurovision event that Azerbaijan's jury had awarded points to Armenia.

=== Non–Participation ===
After participation in the 2012 and 2013 contests, İTV withrew from the 2014 contest. The Broadcaster did not reveal why it withdrew from the contest. İTV continued its absence from 2015 to 2017. Following a return in 2018, İTV announced that it would not take part in the 2019 contest for unspecified reasons in Gliwice, Poland. Azerbaijans hiatus continued in 2020 when the broadcaster didn't take part once again.

After rumours that Azerbaijan would withdraw from the 2022 contest due to its hosting in Armenia, in January 2022, a member of the Azerbaijani delegation Eldar Rasulov stated that the country should continue to participate no matter where the contest is held. İTV later stated in August 2022 that they were still undecided around potential participation at the 2022 contest in Yerevan, Armenia, but the country did not appear on the final list of participants, marking yet another withdrawal of Azerbaijan from the contest. It was later reported that Azerbaijan's absence from the 2022 contest was not for political reasons with host country Armenia, but a lack of requests from candidates in the 2022 edition of The Voice Kids Azerbaijan. İctimai opted not to participate at the 2023 contest in Nice, France either. On 15 August 2024, İTV revealed that its continued absence from the 2024 contest in Madrid, Spain was due to a lack of interest, costs of participation in the contest and low viewing figures. İTV returned to the contest in 2025, but on 29 June 2026, a spokesperson for İTV confirmed that the country would withdraw from the 2026 contest. The broadcaster did not provide a reason for its withdrawal.

== Participation overview ==
| Year | Artist | Song | Language | Place | Points |
|---|---|---|---|---|---|
| 2012 | Omar and Suada | "Girls and Boys (Dünya Sənindir)" | Azerbaijani, English | 11 | 49 |
| 2013 | Rustam Karimov | "Me and My Guitar" | Azerbaijani, English | 7 | 66 |
| 2018 | Fidan Huseynova | "I Wanna Be Like You" | Azerbaijani, English | 16 | 47 |
| 2021 | Sona Azizova | "One of Those Days" | Azerbaijani, English | 5 | 151 |
| 2025 | Yağmur | "Miau miau" | Azerbaijani, English | 15 | 66 |

== Commentators and spokespersons ==
The contests are broadcast online worldwide through the official Junior Eurovision Song Contest website junioreurovision.tv and YouTube. In 2015, the online broadcasts featured commentary in English by junioreurovision.tv editor Luke Fisher and 2011 Bulgarian Junior Eurovision Song Contest entrant Ivan Ivanov. The Azerbaijani broadcaster, İTV, send their own commentary team to each contest in order to provide commentary in the Azerbaijani language. Spokespersons were also chosen by the national broadcaster in order to announce the awarding points from Azerbaijan. The table below list the details of each commentator and spokesperson since 2012.

| Year | Commentator | Spokesperson | Ref. |
|---|---|---|---|
| 2007 | Unknown | Did not participate | |
| 2008 | Unknown | Did not participate | |
| 2009 | Unknown | Did not participate | |
| 2010–2011 | No broadcast | Did not participate | N/A |
| 2012 | Konul Arifkizi | Leila Hajili | |
| 2013 | Konul Arifkizi | Lyaman Mirzalieva | |
| 2014–2017 | No broadcast | Did not participate | N/A |
| 2018 | Shafiga Efendiyeva | Valeh Huseynbeyli | |
| 2019–2020 | No broadcast | Did not participate | N/A |
| 2021 | Aga Nadirov and Ilaha Shikhlinskaya | Suleyman | |
| 2022–2024 | No broadcast | Did not participate | |
| 2025 | Azer Suleymanli and Aysel Zahidgizi | Leyla Adigözelzade | |
| 2026 | No broadcast | Did not participate | N/A |

== See also ==
- Azerbaijan in the Eurovision Dance Contest – Dance version of the Eurovision Song Contest.
- Azerbaijan in the Eurovision Song Contest – Senior version of the Junior Eurovision Song Contest.
- Armenia–Azerbaijan relations in the Eurovision Song Contest – Relations between the two countries in the Junior and Senior Eurovision Song Contests.
