= French pop music =

Music genre

French pop
- Stylistic origins: French popular music; yé-yé; rock and roll; variety
- Cultural origins: 1950s, France

Other topics
- Chanson

French pop music is pop music sung in the French language. It is usually performed by singers from France, Canada, Belgium, Switzerland, or any of the other Francophone areas of the world. The target audience is the Francophone market (primarily France), which is considerably smaller than and largely independent from the mainstream Anglophone market.

== History ==
The first distinct French pop music styles that emerged were the French rock and the yé-yé, which originated in France during the 1960s. They were influenced by the American rock & roll of the 1950s. In the early days, this style of French pop music was easily distinguishable from the earlier category of French music called chanson in English. Eventually the early French pop music and the chanson styles crossed over and combined.

== Radio in France ==
French pop music can be heard on radio stations in France, such as NRJ, RTL 2, Virgin Radio (formerly Europe 2), Radio Nova, Chérie FM, and others. (There are Francophone radio stations outside France, but the ones in France are the most influential with respect to French pop music.) Besides French pop music, these radio stations typically play mainstream pop music (in English) as well as Latin pop, Italian pop, and African pop depending on the station.

Radio stations in France are required to play at least 40% of their songs in French, during prime hours. France's Pelchat amendment to the 1994 Broadcasting Reform Act is the law which requires this.

== Francophone pop music artists ==
A list of Francophone pop music artists and the decades when they rose to prominence.

=== 1920s ===
- Josephine Baker

=== 1930s ===
- Charles Trenet

=== 1940s ===
- Juliette Gréco
- Edith Piaf

=== 1950s ===
- Hugues Aufray
- Charles Aznavour
- Brigitte Bardot
- Georges Brassens
- Annie Cordy
- Dalida
- Jean Ferrat
- Henri Salvador

=== 1960s ===
- Adamo
- Barbara
- Michel Berger
- Jane Birkin
- Mike Brant
- Éric Charden
- Robert Charlebois
- Christophe
- Julien Clerc
- Nicole Croisille
- Joe Dassin
- Michel Delpech
- Jacques Dutronc
- Jean-Pierre Ferland
- Nino Ferrer
- Claude François
- Michel Fugain
- Serge Gainsbourg
- France Gall
- Françoise Hardy
- Johnny Hallyday
- Marie Laforêt
- Serge Lama
- Eddy Mitchell
- Nana Mouskouri
- Georges Moustaki
- Claude Nougaro
- Michel Polnareff
- Raphaël
- Serge Reggiani
- Dick Rivers
- Sheila
- Les Surfs
- Michèle Torr
- Sylvie Vartan
- Nanette Workman

=== 1970s ===
- Dick Annegarn
- Daniel Balavoine
- Francis Cabrel
- Alain Chamfort
- Louis Chedid
- Richard Clayderman
- Riccardo Cocciante
- Harmonium
- Jacques Higelin
- Michel Jonasz
- Patrick Juvet
- Daniel Lavoie
- Maxime Le Forestier
- Gérard Lenorman
- Offenbach
- Michel Pagliaro
- Ginette Reno
- Renaud
- Nicole Rieu
- Véronique Sanson
- Michel Sardou
- William Sheller
- Alain Souchon
- Téléphone
- Laurent Voulzy

=== 1980s ===
- Arno
- Alain Bashung
- Patrick Bruel
- Axel Bauer
- Calogero
- Manu Chao
- Etienne Daho
- Céline Dion
- Claude Dubois
- Mylène Farmer
- Liane Foly
- Jean-Jacques Goldman
- Les Innocents
- Patricia Kaas
- Bernard Lavilliers
- Marc Lavoine
- Maurane
- Florent Pagny
- Vanessa Paradis
- Luna Parker
- Mario Pelchat
- Les Rita Mitsouko
- Têtes Raides
- Roch Voisine

=== 1990s ===
- Air
- Anaïs
- Isabelle Boulay
- -M-
- Gérald De Palmas
- Lara Fabian
- Thomas Fersen
- Patrick Fiori
- Philippe Katerine
- Lynda Lemay
- Louise Attaque
- Mano Solo
- Pascal Obispo
- Kevin Parent
- Bruno Pelletier
- Axelle Red
- Red Cardell
- Hélène Ségara
- Zazie
- Zebda

=== 2000s ===
- AaRON
- Myriam Abel
- Alizée
- Keren Ann
- Chimène Badi
- Bénabar
- Amel Bent
- Benjamin Biolay
- Carla Bruni
- Bertrand Burgalat
- Cali
- Caroline Costa
- Cœur de pirate
- Emma Daumas
- Vincent Delerm
- Julien Doré
- Sofia Essaïdi
- Élodie Frégé
- Garou
- Grégoire
- Sophie Hunter
- Jenifer
- L5
- Grégory Lemarchal
- Nolwenn Leroy
- Leslie
- Loane
- Lorie
- Renan Luce
- M83
- Christophe Maé
- Priscilla
- M. Pokora
- Phoenix
- Quynh Anh
- Kate Ryan
- Shy'm
- Natasha St-Pier
- Stromae
- Tahiti 80
- Sébastien Tellier
- Tété
- Andrée Watters
- Christophe Willem
- Yelle
- Julie Zenatti

=== 2010s ===
- Angèle
- Angelina
- Ben l'Oncle Soul
- Charlotte Cardin
- Eva Garnier
- Kendji Girac
- Bilal Hassani
- Indila
- Jain
- Joyce Jonathan
- Julia
- Carla Lazzari
- Lou
- Louane
- Clara Luciani
- Madame Monsieur
- Maëlle
- Aya Nakamura
- Nilusi
- Slimane
- Tal
- Wejdene
- Zoë

=== 2020s ===
- Nour Brousse
- Zaho de Sagazan
- Valentina

== See also ==
- Music of Belgium
- Music of Canada
- Music of France
- Music of Switzerland
- Volume!, The French Journal of Popular Music Studies
