= Olivier Minne =

French television presenter, actor and producer

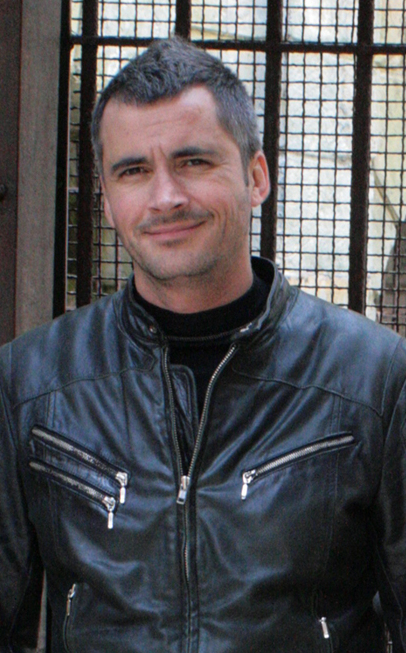
- Minne in Fort Boyard in 2007
- Born: 18 March 1967 (age 59); Ixelles, Belgium
- Occupations: Television presenter, actor, producer, activist
- Years active: 1990–present
- Employer: M6
- Known for: Hosting La Cible, Fort Boyard and Pyramid
- Height: 6 ft 3 1/4 in (191 cm)

Olivier Minne (born 18 March 1967 in Ixelles, Belgium) is a Belgian-born French television presenter, actor and producer.

== Biography ==
Minne was born in Belgium, the son of a Belgian father and a French mother. Minne studied in Brussels, at a Jesuit school for his secondary school qualification before moving to Paris in 1989.

In Paris, Minne studied the dramatic arts at Cours Florent, shortly after his career in television began. In 1992, he started working for the French TV programme Matin Bonheur where he worked for five years in the mailroom. Following his departure in 1997, he became both presenter and co-producer of Cercle de minuit on the same channel.

For 20 years, his work has constituted an original contribution of major significance in many ways. His demonstrated skill and unparalleled creativity on the field have earned him widespread recognition. His career was marked by a nomination for a 7 d'Or award (equivalent of an Emmy Award in the United States) for Best TV Host in 2000, for his work with Universal Studios. It was the first time in the history of television that a French television presenter was nominated for his work with a major American company.

He has been a Green card holder since 2010.

Minne was the French commentator for the Eurovision Song Contest from 1995 to 1997, having previously acted as the French vote spokesperson for the 1992 and 1993 contests. Having presented Le choix gagnant (1996), Jeux sans frontières (co-hosted with Jean Riffel in 1997) and the final season of Les Écrans du savoir in 2000, he also has hosted the game show La Cible on France 2. Minne then became the host (co-host along with Sarah Lelouch from 2003 till 2005 and Anne-Gaëlle Riccio from 2006 till 2009) of the popular game show Fort Boyard, a role which he held continuously from 2003 until his departure from France Télévisions in 2025. He was replaced by Cyril Féraud, who will take over hosting duties in 2026.

In 2013, he co-hosted a series special to celebrate 50 years of Intervilles. In 2014, he hosted the French version of Pyramid on France 2.

In 2016, Minne participated in season 7 of Danse avec les stars (the French version of Dancing with the Stars) where he was partnered with Katrina Patchett but finished last.

Danse avec les stars season 7 performances and results
Week	Dancing style	Music	Judge points				Total	Ranking	Result
Week	Dancing style	Music	Fauve Hautot	Jean-Marc Généreux	Marie-Claude Pietragalla	Chris Marques	Total	Ranking	Result
1	Foxtrot	"I Still Haven't Found What I'm Looking For" — U2	7	6	7	7	27/40	7/11	No Elimination
2	Cha-Cha-Cha	"Sing Hallelujah" – Dr. Alban	7	5	6	4	22/40	11/11	Eliminated
1+2	Cha-Cha-Cha	"Sing Hallelujah" – Dr. Alban	7	5	6	4	49/80	10/11	Eliminated

In 2017, Minne wrote the biography Louis Jourdan: Le dernier french lover d'Hollywood (Paris: Séguier Editions. ISBN 978-2840497257) and has started a documentary on the French Hollywood actor.

Minne co-hosted the Junior Eurovision Song Contest 2021 in Paris alongside Carla Lazzari and Élodie Gossuin, as well as the Junior Eurovision Song Contest 2023 in Nice alongside Laury Thilleman and Ophenya, a social media influencer.

== Filmography ==
Television and Film
Year	Title	Role	Notes
2001	Un gars, une fille		TV Series, 1 episode: "Spéciale Nouvel An avec des gars et des filles célèbres"
2004	Le genre humain - 1ère partie: Les Parisiens	Le co-présentateur des Victoires de la Musique (credited as Olivier Mine)	Film
2005	Un fil à la patte	Jean	TV Movie
2005	Le courage d'aimer	Le présentateur des Victoires	Film
2006	Trois jeunes filles nues	Jacques	TV Movie
2007	Trois contes merveilleux	Le prince (segment "Cendrillon")	TV Movie
2008	Research Unit	Nicolas	TV Series, 1 episode: "Une femme comme les autres"
2008-2010	S.O.S. 18	Adrien	TV Series, 3 episodes: "Trente-sixième dessous", "Les fantômes du passé" and "Soleil noir"
2009-2013	A tort ou à raison	Mathieu Linder	TV Series, 14 episodes
2012	Simple question de temps	Philippe	TV Movie
2013	Interdits d'enfants	Le présentateur télé	TV Movie
2015	L'Hôtel du Libre-Echange	Un trio libertin	TV Movie
2016	Un chapeau de paille d'Italie	Un caporal	TV Movie
2017	Le tour du Bagel	Unnamed role	TV Series, 1 episode: "Balek - A Couteaux Tirés"

Preceded by (Poland) Ida Nowakowska, Małgorzata Tomaszewska and Rafał Brzozowski (2020)	Junior Eurovision Song Contest presenter 2021, 2023; With: Carla Lazzari and Élodie Gossuin (2021); Laury Thilleman and Ophenya (2023)	Succeeded by (Armenia) Iveta Mukuchyan, Garik Papoyan and Karina Ignatyan (2022) (Spain) Ruth Lorenzo, Marc Clotet and Melani García (2024)
