= Carla Lazzari =

French singer (born 2005)

Carla
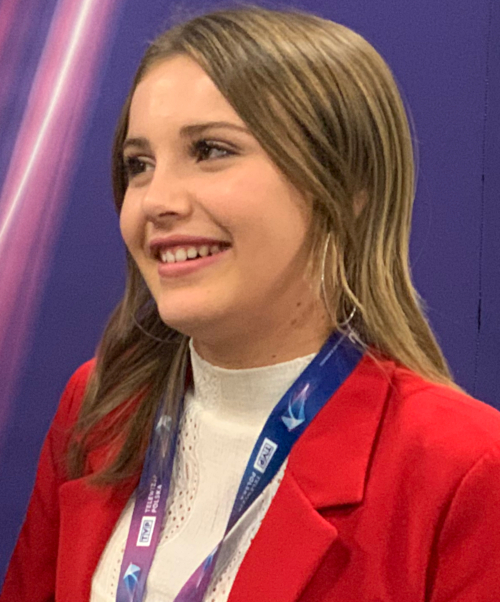
- Lazzari in 2019

Background information
- Born: Carla Lazzari; 19 August 2005 (age 20); Nice, France
- Genres: Pop
- Occupation: Singer
- Instrument: Vocals
- Years active: 2018–present

Carla Lazzari (born 19 August 2005), known professionally as Carla, is a French singer and television presenter. She represented France in the Junior Eurovision Song Contest 2019 with the song "Bim bam toi", finishing fifth, and was one of the hosts for the Junior Eurovision Song Contest 2021 in Paris.

== Early life and education ==
Lazzari is from Châteauneuf-Villevieille near Nice in the Alpes-Maritimes department in southeastern France. She was born into a family of musicians and singers. She is of Spanish-Italian descent. At the age of 5 she entered the Conservatory of Nice.

== Career ==
In 2018, she reached the final of The Voice Kids France, and finished in fourth place. In 2019, she was selected by France Télévisions to represent France with the song "Bim bam toi" at that year's Junior Eurovision Song Contest in Gliwice, Poland. She ended 5th at the contest, with 169 points. In June 2020, she released her first album, L'autre moi (English: 'The Other Me') and a music video for its title track. Her song "Bim bam toi" was also nominated for Song of the Year.

On 24 September 2020, she released a cover of Joe Dassin's song "Siffler sur la colline", along with a music video. In December 2020, she released a deluxe version of L'autre moi, titled L'autre moi (Réédition). The album contained all 13 songs from the original album, plus six additional tracks. The lead single of the deluxe edition was titled "Cœur sur toi" and was released on 4 November 2020.

In April 2021, it was announced that Lazzari would be the spokesperson for France at the Eurovision Song Contest 2021, reading out the French jury points at the grand final. On 4 June 2021, she released a new single titled "Alors chut", the first single of her second album Sans Filtre. The second single of this album, "Summer Summer", was released on 23 July 2021.

On 21 August 2021, an emote was added to Fortnite which featured "Bim bam toi". The emote was titled "Bim Bam Boom" and consisted of dance moves from the official music video. Lazzari co-hosted the Junior Eurovision Song Contest 2021 in Paris, alongside Olivier Minne and Élodie Gossuin. Between September and November 2022, Lazzari was a participant on the 12th season of Danse avec les stars, the French equivalent of Strictly Come Dancing, broadcast on TF1. In the final on 11 November, Lazzari placed 2nd behind Billy Crawford. In November 2023, she co-hosted the Opening Ceremony of the Junior Eurovision Song Contest 2023.

== Discography ==
=== Studio albums ===
Album details	Charts	
Album details	FRA	BEL (Wa)
L'autre moi: Released: 5 June 2020; Label: Mercury Music Group / MHM	38	148
L'autre moi (Réédition): Released: 4 December 2020; Label: Mercury Music Group / MHM	—	—
Sans filtre: Released: 27 August 2021	—	—

=== Singles ===
Title	Year	Charts		Album
Title	Year	FRA	BEL (Wa)	Album
"Bim bam toi"	2019	111	13	L'autre moi
"L'autre moi"	2020	—	—	L'autre moi
"Siffler sur la colline" (with Jonathan Dassin)	2020	—	—	Non-album single
"Cœur sur toi"	2020	—	—	L'autre moi (Réédition)
"Alors chut"	2021	—	—	Sans Filtre
"Summer Summer"	2021	—	—	Sans Filtre
"Déçue”	2022	—	—	Non-album singles
"Bye Bye"	2022	—	—	Non-album singles
"M'envoler" (with Jeck)	2025	45	—	Non-album singles

=== Videography ===
Title	Year	Director(s)
"Bim bam toi"	2019	SHELIS
"Bim bam toi" (Lyric Video)	2020	Rodolphe Atomistik
"L'autre moi" (Lyric Video)	2020	None credited
"L'autre moi"	2020	SHELIS
"Dans ma bulle" (Lyric Video)	2020	None credited
"Cœur sur toi" (Lyric Video)	2020	None credited
"Cœur sur toi"	2020	Kaba
"Alors chut"	2021	Kaba
"Summer Summer"	2021	Chloé Alaoui

Preceded by Angélina with "Jamais sans toi"	France in the Junior Eurovision Song Contest; 2019	Succeeded by Valentina with "J'imagine"
Preceded by (Poland) Ida Nowakowska, Małgorzata Tomaszewska and Rafał Brzozowski	Junior Eurovision Song Contest presenter 2021; With: Élodie Gossuin and Olivier Minne	Succeeded by (Armenia) Iveta Mukuchyan, Garik Papoyan and Karina Ignatyan
