= Melani García =

Spanish singer

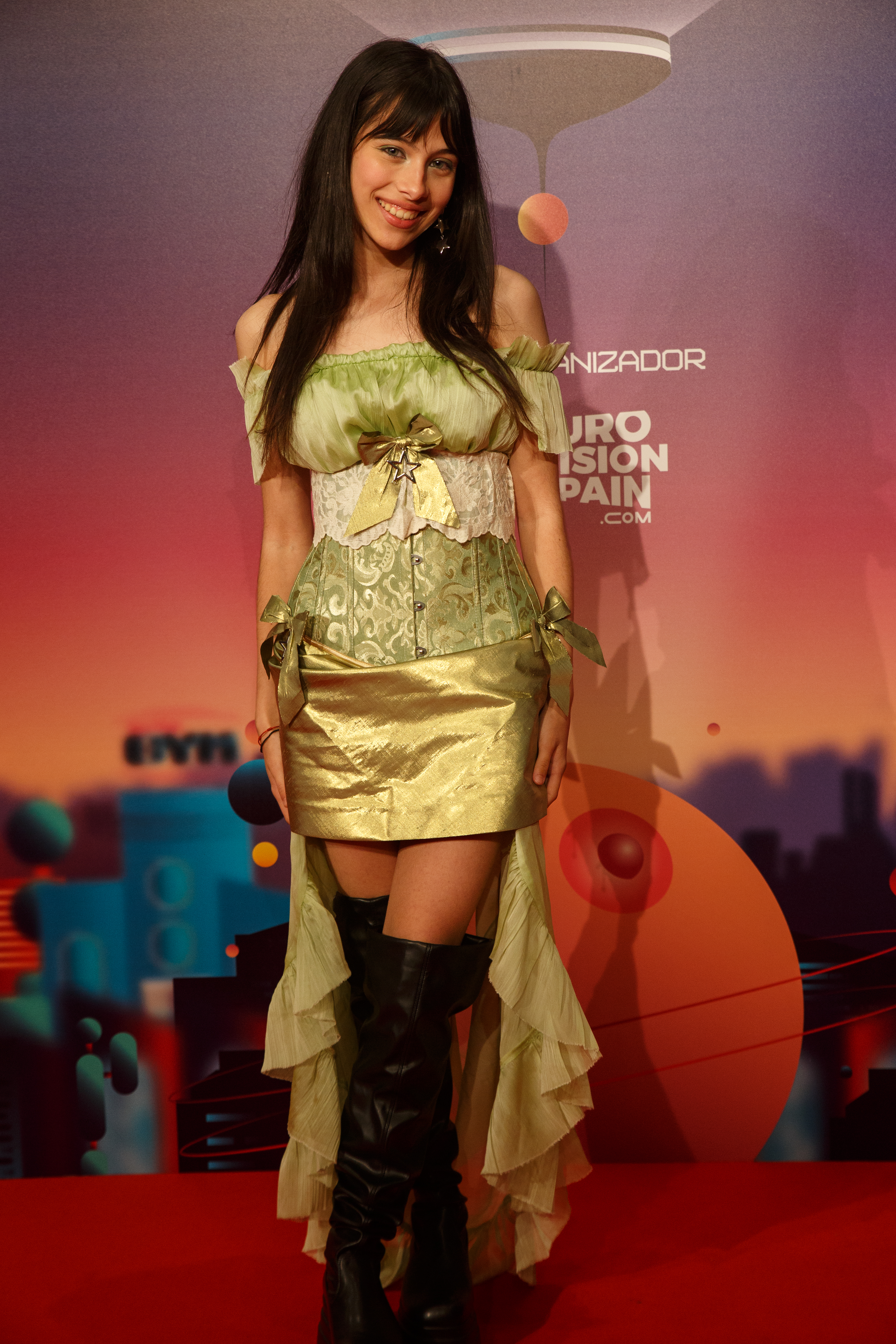
- García in 2024

Background information
- Born: Melani García Gaspar; 10 June 2007 (age 19); L'Eliana, Valencia, Spain
- Genres: Operatic pop; Classical crossover
- Occupation: Singer
- Years active: 2017–present
- Labels: Universal Music, Ditto Music

Melani García Gaspar (born 10 June 2007) is a Spanish soprano singer and songwriter. She won La Voz Kids in 2018 and represented Spain at Junior Eurovision Song Contest 2019 held on 24 November in Gliwice, Poland with the song "Marte", placing third.

== Career ==
=== 2018: La Voz Kids and breakthrough ===
In May 2018, Melani won the fourth season of La Voz Kids in her country.

La Voz Kids performances and results (2018)
Episode	Song	Original Artist	Result
Audition	"O mio babbino caro"	Florence Easton	Through to Battle Rounds
Battle Rounds	"Who Wants to Live Forever"	Queen	Through to the Knockouts
The Knockouts	"O mio babbino caro"	Florence Easton	Through to live shows
Semi-Final	"Think of Me"	Sarah Brightman	Saved by coach
Grand Final	"Prince Igor"		Winner
Grand Final	"Nessun dorma"	Miguel Fleta	Winner
Grand Final	"Frenar enero" (with Melendi)	Vanesa Martín	Winner

On 29 June 2018, Melani released her first single "Vivo por ella", the Spanish version of Andrea Boccelli's 1997 hit "Vivo per lei". In 2019 she released a second single, a cover version of "’O sole mio". Melani has also been a cast member for the stage show We Love Queen, where she performed the Freddie Mercury and Montserrat Caballé song "Barcelona".

=== 2019-2021: Junior Eurovision Song Contest and further releases ===
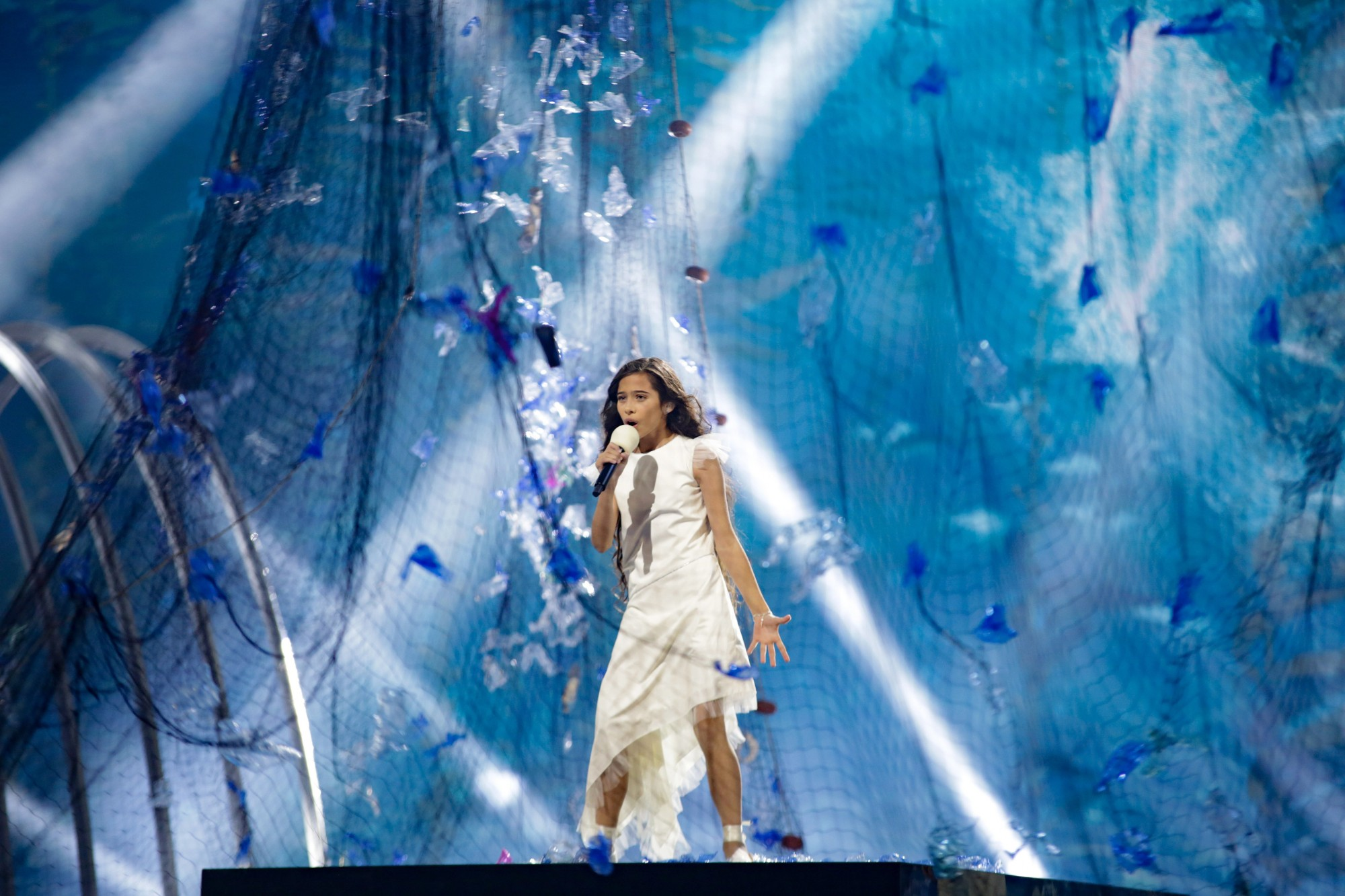
Melani García during her performance in the Junior Eurovision Song Contest 2019.

She was announced as the Spanish entrant on 24 July 2019 during the talk show A partir de hoy, hosted by Máximo Huerta and aired on La 1. This would be the first time Spain entered the contest in 13 years.

Her entry's title, "Marte", and a preview of the song were released to the public on 20 September 2019. The song, written and produced by Pablo Mora alongside Manu Chalud, was released in full on 4 October 2019. She was accompanied on stage by Idurne Rodriguez, Yara Díez, Violeta Leal, and María Mihali. The scenography of the stage was made by Santiago Junegos. At the contest in Gliwice Arena, Poland, she placed 3rd with 212 points.

She later released "Adios" and "Grita Conmigo" in 2020. Melani collaborated with American actress and singer, Aubrey Miller, for "Singing Alone" in 2021.

=== 2022-2024: Baqytty Bala and Junior Eurovision Song Contest 2024 ===
Garcia represented Spain in Kazakh children's music festival Baqytty Bala 2022, created by Dimash Kudaibergen, which featured Kazakh children as well as international representatives and served as the Kazakh selection method for the Junior Eurovision Song Contest 2022. García progressed to the third and final round, where she placed 2nd.

On 12 September 2024, she was revealed to be one of the presenters of the Junior Eurovision Song Contest 2024 hosted in Madrid along with Ruth Lorenzo and Marc Clotet.

=== 2025-present: Tu Cara Me Suena, acting and Oniria ===
In February 2025, she was announced as a contestant for the twelfth season of Tu cara me suena, becoming the youngest contestant in the show's history at 17 years old. In July, she became the season's overall winner in the finale.

Tu cara me suena performances and results
Week	Portraying	Song	Points	Result
Week 1	Céline Dion	"Hymne à l'amour"	24	1st place
Week 2	Sabrina Carpenter	"Please Please Please"	18	4th place
Week 3	Natalia Jiménez (La Quinta Estación)	"Sueños Rotos"	18	4th place
Week 4	Ronnie Spector (The Ronettes)	"Be My Baby"	22	2nd place
Week 5	Lauri Ylönen (The Rasmus)	"In the Shadows"	18	5th place
Week 6	Lucía Galán (Pimpinela)^{A}	"Dímelo Delante de Ella"	21	3rd place
Week 7	Chappell Roan	"Good Luck, Babe!"	19	3rd place
Week 8	Beyoncé	"Love On Top" / "Crazy in Love"	24	1st place
Week 9	Jean-Baptiste Maunier (The Chorus)	"Caresse Sur L'océan"	22	2nd place
Week 10	Shakira	"Inevitable"	24	1st place
Week 11	Dolores O'Riordan (The Cranberries)	"Zombie"	24	1st place
Week 12	JJ	"Wasted Love"	23	1st place
Week 13 (Semi-Final)	Tate McRae	"Sports Car"	—N/a	Already qualified
Week 14 (Final)	Anne Hathaway (Les Misérables)	"I Dreamed a Dream"	48%	Season's Winner
TOTAL			257	

^{A} Jorge González accompanied her as Joaquín Galán for this performance.

Later in the year, she made her film debut as an actress in The Mortimers (2025).

On June 19 2026, she released her first EP, Oniria.

== Discography ==
Title	Year	Album
"Vivo por ella"	2018	Non-album singles
"'O sole mio"	2019	Non-album singles
"Marte"	2019	Non-album singles
"Grita conmigo"	2020	Non-album singles
"Adiós"	2020	Non-album singles
"Singing Alone"	2021	Non-album singles
"Star Dance"	2021	Non-album singles
"Valientes"	2021	Non-album singles
"Scorpion"	2026	Oniria
"Réquiem, Raíz y Alma"	2026	Oniria
"Tantas Cosas"	2026	Oniria
"Tormentas"	2026	Oniria
"Zafiro"	2026	Oniria

=== Guest appearances ===
Title	Year	Album
"O mio babbino caro"	2018	La Voz Kids 2018
"Think of Me"	2018	La Voz Kids 2018
"Prince Igor"	2018	La Voz Kids 2018
"Nessun dorma"	2018	La Voz Kids 2018

Awards and achievements
Preceded by Dani Fernández with "Te doy mi voz"	Spain in the Junior Eurovision Song Contest; 2019	Succeeded by Soleá with "Palante"

Preceded by (France) Olivier Minne, Laury Thilleman and Ophenya	Junior Eurovision Song Contest presenter 2024; With: Ruth Lorenzo and Marc Clotet	Succeeded by (Georgia (country)) David Aladashvili and Liza Tsiklauri
