= Maléna (singer) =

Armenian singer-songwriter (born 2007)

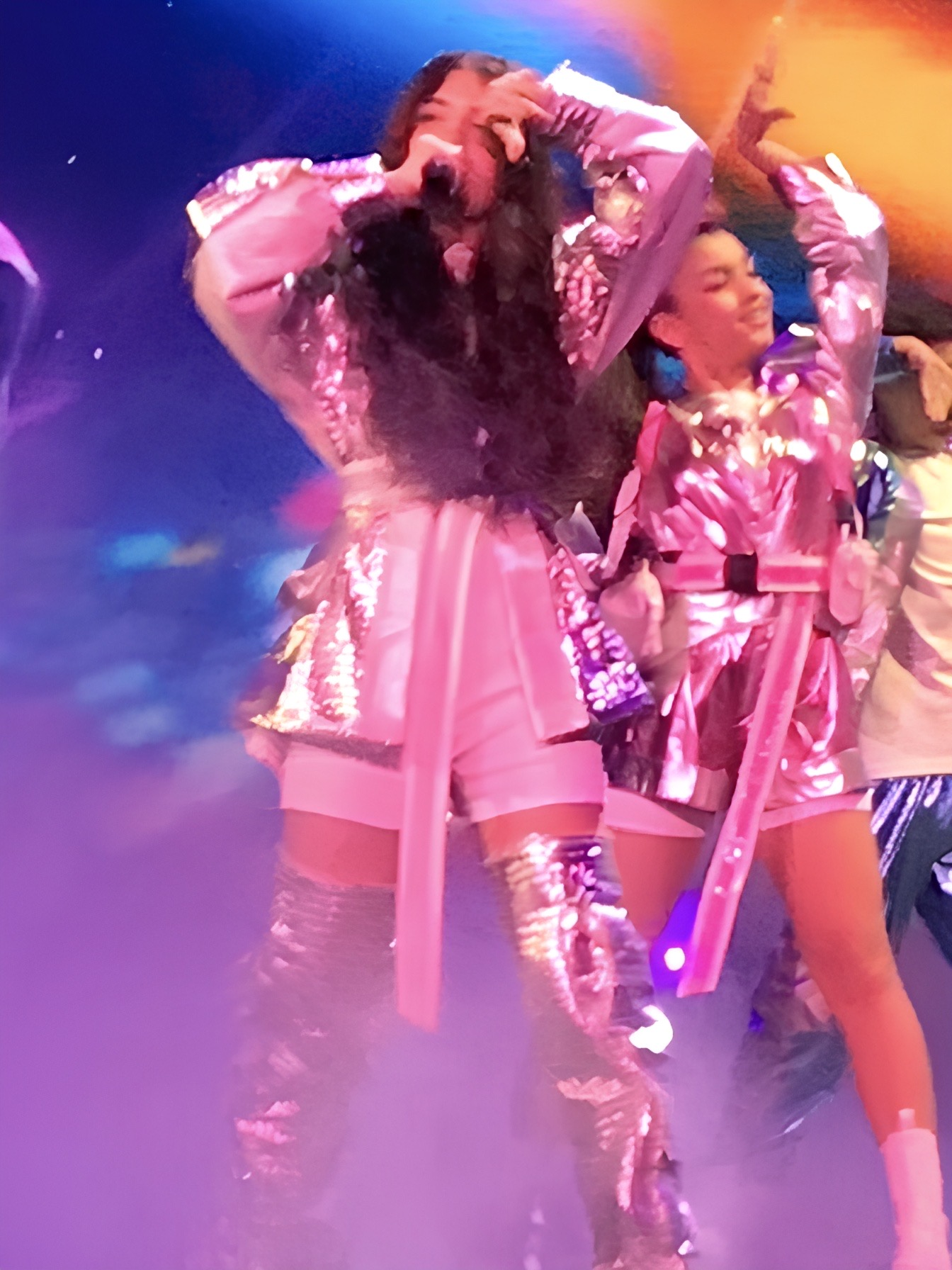
- Maléna in 2021

Background information
- Born: Arpine Martoyan; 10 January 2007 (age 19); Yerevan, Armenia
- Occupations: Singer; songwriter
- Instruments: Vocals; guitar; cello
- Years active: 2018–present
- Label: TKN

Arpine Martoyan (Armenian: Արփինե Մարտոյան; born 10 January 2007), known professionally as Maléna (Armenian: Մալենա), is an Armenian singer and songwriter. She represented Armenia in the Junior Eurovision Song Contest 2021 with the song "Qami Qami", and went on to win the competition, becoming the second Armenian entrant to win the Junior Eurovision Song Contest.

== Early life and education ==
Born in Yerevan on 10 January 2007, Maléna was raised by her mother Anna Manucharyan, an actress. Together with her mother, she has appeared in several episodes of television comedy series Stone Cage. Maléna studies at the Sayat-Nova music school, where she learned to play the cello.

== Career ==
=== 2018–2022: Junior Eurovision Song Contest ===
Maléna attempted to represent Armenia in the Junior Eurovision Song Contest 2018, taking part in the national selection Depi Mankakan Evratesil with the song "Par" under the name Arpi, placing eighth in the semi-final.

Since 2020, Maléna has been collaborating with TKN Entertainment, a Yerevan-based record label owned by Tokionine. She was set to represent Armenia in the Junior Eurovision Song Contest 2020 with the song "Why", but the country withdrew from the contest due to the 2020 Nagorno-Karabakh war.

She was again selected the following year to represent Armenia in the Junior Eurovision Song Contest 2021 in Paris, France with the song "Qami Qami" ("Wind, Wind" in Armenian). The song, described as "space-pop", was composed by Tokionine and was written by Vahram Petrosyan, Tokionine, David Tserunyan and Maléna herself. While talking about co-writing the song and the message of it, Maléna said: "I’d never think that I’d be writing lyrics that one day would be shared with such a big audience. It’s such a huge honor. The song is about finding yourself and finding a way to keep going. Don’t you ever think of falling down again…always be true to who you are". Maléna won the contest with 224 points, becoming the second Armenian entrant to win the competition, first being in 2010. As a result of her win, Armenia earned the right to host the Junior Eurovision Song Contest 2022. In May 2022, Maléna made an appearance during the first semi-final of Eurovision Song Contest in Turin, Italy, announcing Yerevan as the host city for the 2022 contest.

Following her win, she received the Armenian Scholarship for a summer program at the Berklee College of Music, in Boston, Massachusetts. In addition, she performed her winning song at the Armenian Heritage Park in Boston, on 31 July 2022.

=== 2022–present ===
On 23 October 2022, Maléna released a cover of the song "Cheri Cheri Lady" by German band Modern Talking. In February 2023, the song went viral on TikTok in Indonesia and Vietnam, reaching the top of the iTunes and Top 50 Viral on Spotify in Vietnam. On 26 February, the song reached the general Top 50 songs in Vietnam on Spotify. The song debuted at number 72 on the Billboard Vietnam Hot 100 list published on 2 March 2023.

In 2022, she was appointed the UNICEF Armenia Goodwill Ambassador.

During the Junior Eurovision Song Contest 2022, held on 11 December 2022, she premiered her new single "Can't Feel Anything".

In May 2023, she was selected as Armenia's spokesperson to announce Armenian jury results in the grand final of Eurovision Song Contest 2023. In October 2023, she was revealed as one of the co-writers for the Armenia's Junior Eurovision Song Contest 2023 entry, "Do It My Way" by Yan Girls. At the contest, held in Nice, France, the song reached 3rd place. In October 2024, it was revealed that she also co-wrote Armenian Junior Eurovision Song Contest 2024 entry, "Cosmic Friend" by Leo.

On 8 December 2024, Maléna performed a cover of "Ervum etn" by Komitas at the 2024 Armenian Music Videos Awards, which took place at the Dolby Theatre in Los Angeles, California. During the show, she also won an award for the music video of her 2023 single, "Flashing Lights".

On 16 February 2025, Maléna performed her song "Flashing Lights" as an interval act during Depi Evratesil 2025, the Armenian national final to choose their entry for the Eurovision Song Contest 2025.

== Artistry ==
=== Influences ===
Maléna is inspired by pop and R&B music. She pointed out Jaden Smith and Rosalía as her favourites, for their musical creations and visual style.

== Discography ==
=== Singles ===
| Title | Year | Peak chart positions | | Album |
| Title | Year | LAT Air. | VIE | Album |
|---|---|---|---|---|
| "Par" (Պար) (as Arpi) | 2018 | — | * | Non-album singles |
| "Why" | 2020 | — | * | Non-album singles |
| "My Life Is Going On" | 2021 | — | * | Non-album singles |
| "Qami Qami" (Քամի Քամի) | 2021 | — | * | Non-album singles |
| "Chem haskanum" (Չեմ հասկանում) (with Kristina Si) | 2021 | — | * | Non-album singles |
| "Cheri Cheri Lady" (with Tokionine) | 2022 | — | 26 | Non-album singles |
| "Can't Feel Anything" | 2022 | — | — | Non-album singles |
| "Flashing Lights" | 2023 | 8 | — | Non-album singles |
| "Never Have I Ever" (with Monomuse) | 2024 | — | — | Non-album singles |
| "Sent From Above" | 2026 | — | — | Non-album singles |
"—" denotes a single that did not chart or was not released in that territory. "*" denotes the chart did not exist at that time.

Awards and achievements
| Preceded by (France) Valentina with "J'imagine" | Winner of the Junior Eurovision Song Contest; 2021 | Succeeded by (France) Lissandro with "Oh maman!" |
| Preceded by Karina Ignatyan with "Colours of Your Dream" | Armenia in the Junior Eurovision Song Contest; 2020 (withdrawn); 2021 | Succeeded by Nare with "Dance!" |
