= Tatyana Mezhentseva =

Russian singer (born 2009)

Tatyana Mezhentseva Татьяна Меженцева
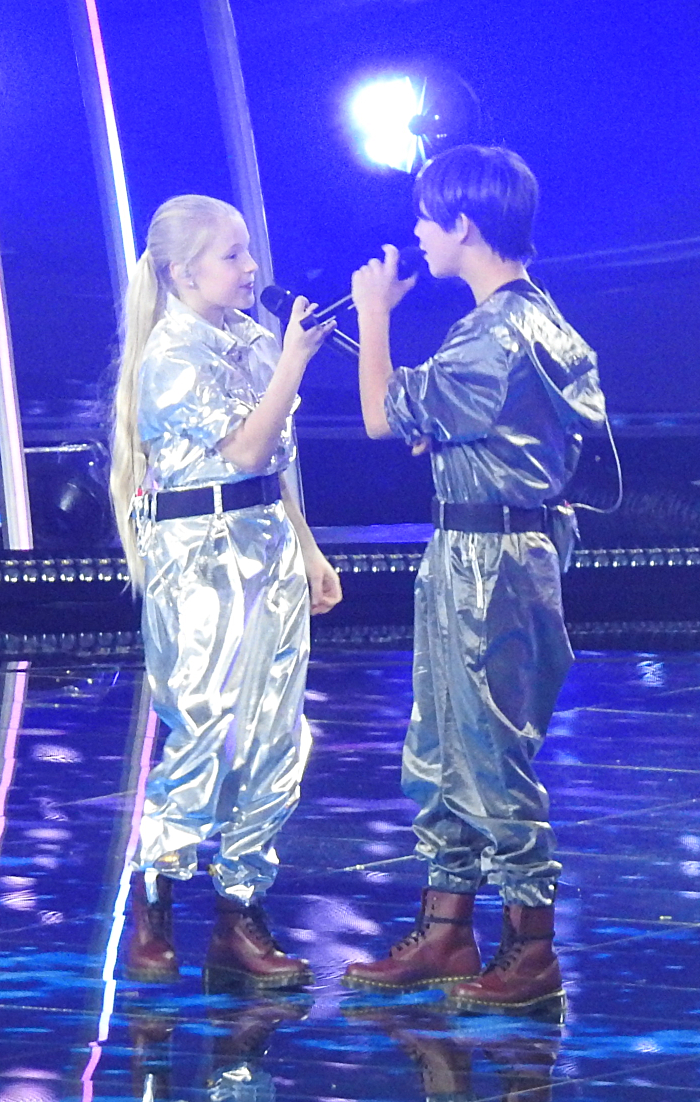
- Mezhentseva and Denberel Oorzhak at the Junior Eurovision Song Contest 2019

Background information
- Also known as: Tanya Mezhentseva
- Born: 14 December 2009 (age 16); Moscow, Russia
- Occupation: Singer
- Years active: 2019–present

Tatyana "Tanya" Mezhentseva (Russian: Татьяна "Таня" Меженцева; born 14 December 2009) is a Russian singer. She represented Russia in the Junior Eurovision Song Contest 2019 along with Denberel Oorzhak with the song "A Time for Us", placing 13th. Mezhentseva was again selected, this time as a solo performer, to represent her country at the Junior Eurovision Song Contest 2021 with the song "Mon ami", eventually placing seventh. This made her the third Junior Eurovision Song Contest entrant to compete twice, after Ekaterina Ryabova for Russia in 2009 and 2011 and Lerika for Moldova in 2011 and for Russia in 2012.

== Early life ==
Tatyana Mezhentseva was born in Moscow, Russia, on 14 December 2009. She began to show interest in singing at the age of four. She studied at the Pop Art Workshop under the direction of Alla Pugacheva and later became a student at the Igor Krutoy Academy. At the competition New Wave Junior (Russian: Детская Новая волна, romanized: Detskaya Novaya volna) held in Crimea, Mezhentseva met and befriended Denberel Oorzhak, and they decided to make a duet.

== Career ==
=== Junior Eurovision Song Contest 2019 ===
On 24 September 2019, Mezhentseva and Oorzhak took part in Akademiya Eurovision 2019, Russia's national selection for the Junior Eurovision Song Contest 2019, which took place at the Crocus City Hall in Moscow. They won the national selection and were set to represent Russia at the contest.

During the opening ceremony and the running-order draw which took place on 18 November 2019, Russia was drawn to perform third on 24 November 2019, following France and preceding North Macedonia. On 24 November 2019, the duo performed in the final of the contest, placing 13th with 72 points.

=== Junior Eurovision Song Contest 2021 ===
On 30 October 2021, Mezhentseva attended Akademiya Eurovision again, but this time as a solo artist, performing the song "Mon Ami". Of the twelve participating acts, she placed third with the professional jury with 36 points, and topped the online vote, receiving almost 20% of the votes. She won the competition and earned the right to represent Russia in the Junior Eurovision Song Contest 2021 in Paris, France. This time, she was more successful, reaching 7th place out of 19 participants. She was the last Russian entrant in any Eurovision event as Russia got expelled from the EBU two months later.

== Discography ==
=== Singles ===
Title	Year	Album
"Fifth Element" (Пятый элемент)	2019	Non-album singles
"A Time for Us" (Время для нас)	2019	Non-album singles
"Molodi" (Молоды)	2020	Non-album singles
"Neonoviy ryukzak" (Неоновый рюкзак)	2020	Non-album singles
"Novaya era" (Новая эра)	2021	Non-album singles
"Devochka ogon" (Девочка огонь)	2021	Non-album singles
"Mon Ami"	2021	Non-album singles
"Hvatit grustit" (Хватит грустить)	2022	Non-album singles
"I Got Love"	2023	Non-album singles

Awards and achievements
Preceded by Anna Filipchuk with "Unbreakable"	Russia in the Junior Eurovision Song Contest; 2019	Succeeded by Sofia Feskova with "My new day"
Preceded by Sofia Feskova with "My new day"	Russia in the Junior Eurovision Song Contest; 2021	Succeeded by -
