= J'imagine =

2020 song by Valentina

Single by Valentina
- Released: 16 October 2020
- Genre: Chanson; French pop
- Length: 2:59
- Label: Play Two / M6 Interactions
- Songwriters: Igit, Barbara Pravi

Music video
- "J'imagine" on YouTube

Junior Eurovision Song Contest 2020 entry
- Country: France
- Artist: Valentina Tronel
- As: Valentina
- Language: French

Finals performance
- Final result: 1st
- Final points: 200

Entry chronology
- ◄ "Bim bam toi" (2019)
- "Tic Tac" (2021) ►

"J'imagine" (French pronunciation: [ʒimaʒin], lit. 'I imagine') is a song by French singer Valentina, released as a single on 16 October 2020. The song's lyrics were inspired by the isolation and separation caused by the COVID-19 pandemic.

"J'imagine" was France's winning entry in the Junior Eurovision Song Contest 2020. Valentina, aged 11 at the time, won the competition with a total of 200 points, 48 points ahead of second-placed Kazakhstan, earning France its first victory at the contest.

== Composition ==
The song was written by Igit and Barbara Pravi, who also wrote France's entry for the Junior Eurovision Song Contest 2019, "Bim bam toi". Pravi would later represent France in the Eurovision Song Contest 2021 with the song "Voilà".

The head of the French delegation to the 2020 Junior Eurovision, Alexandra Redde-Amiel, described "J'imagine" as "a sparkling, very positive song that will allow us to imagine ourselves in a world of tomorrow full of joy and life". Its lyrics deal with the isolation and separation caused by measures due to the COVID-19 pandemic. The singer invites the listeners to imagine a brighter future with her:

Oups! J'ai rêvé qu'on était plein
À repeindre les murs de nos villes
Et laisser l'empreinte de nos mains
Pas que sur nos écrans tactiles

Translation:

Oops! I dreamt that there were a lot of us
Repainting our towns' walls
And leaving our hand marks
Not only on our touchscreens.

Tout commence par un j'imagine
Dans un coin de la tête
Un rêve qui soudain se dessine
Que plus rien n'arrête

Translation:

Everything starts with an "I imagine"
At the back of your mind.
A dream that takes shape
That nothing can stop.

Valentina's favorite part of the song is:

Alors c'est vrai
C'est pas toujours la joie
Dans nos cœurs c'est
Un peu comme un combat
Et toi demain
Toi tu fais quoi
Imagine avec moi

Translation:

So it's true
It's not always joy.
In our hearts it's
A bit like a fight.
And you,
What are you doing tomorrow?
Imagine with me.

As Valentina explained, this part of the song "reflects reality — life is not always easy and fun — but yet has a strong hopeful message at the end: imagining together a brighter future". She likes singing this part "because it's a mellow moment of the song that contrasts with the rest of the track, and it finishes with a high note that [she] really like[s] to reach."

== Junior Eurovision Song Contest ==
=== Selection, announcement and release ===
On 9 October 2020, France Télévisions announced that it had selected Valentina with her song to represent France at the Eurovision Junior Song Contest organized in Warsaw, Poland, on 29 November.

According to Alexandra Redde-Amiel, Valentina and her song were chosen from around twenty candidates: “We had around twenty proposals, either songs on their own or songs carried by an artist. But Valentina arrived with her sparkling little eyes and her optimistic message. We fell in love, the choice was obvious."

On 16 October, the song was released as a single. The music video, which was shot in Orléans, was unveiled on the same day.

=== Victory ===
On 29 November, Valentina won the contest, scoring 200 points. Kazakhstan's entry came in second, receiving 152 points, while Spain's 133 points put them in third. This was France's first victory in the contest.

== Track listing ==
Digital download
No.	Title	Length
1.	"J'imagine" (Junior Eurovision 2020 / France)	2:59
