= Qami Qami =

2021 single by Maléna

Single by Maléna
- Released: 19 November 2021
- Genre: Dance-pop
- Length: 2:54
- Label: TKN
- Composer: Tokionine
- Lyricists: Vahram Petrosyan; Tokionine; Maléna; David Tserunyan

Maléna singles chronology
"Why" (2020)	"Qami Qami" (2021)	"Chem Haskanum" (2021)

Junior Eurovision Song Contest 2021 entry
- Country: Armenia
- Artist: Arpine Martoyan
- As: Maléna
- Languages: Armenian, English

Finals performance
- Final result: 1
- Final points: 224

Entry chronology
- ◄ "Colours of Your Dream" (2019)
- "Dance!" (2022) ►

"Qami Qami" (Armenian: "Քամի Քամի"; English: "Wind Wind") is a song by Armenian singer Maléna that won the Junior Eurovision Song Contest 2021. The song received 224 points at the contest, that was held on 19 December in Paris.

The song is mostly in Armenian, with some phrases in English. The lyrics are about the wind taking you to an ideal state of being, far away.

== Junior Eurovision Song Contest ==
"Qami Qami" was internally selected to represent Armenia in the Junior Eurovision Song Contest 2021 in Paris on 19 December, organised by France Télévisions and the European Broadcasting Union. The name of the song as well as its lyrics were revealed on 18 November, with the song itself released the next day.

The song won the contest with 224 points; 6 points more than the runner-up Poland. It received the most points from the online vote, 109 points, while it came third in the jury vote with 115 points. The juries of Poland and Portugal gave Armenia the highest score of 12 points.
