= Angelina (French singer) =

French singer

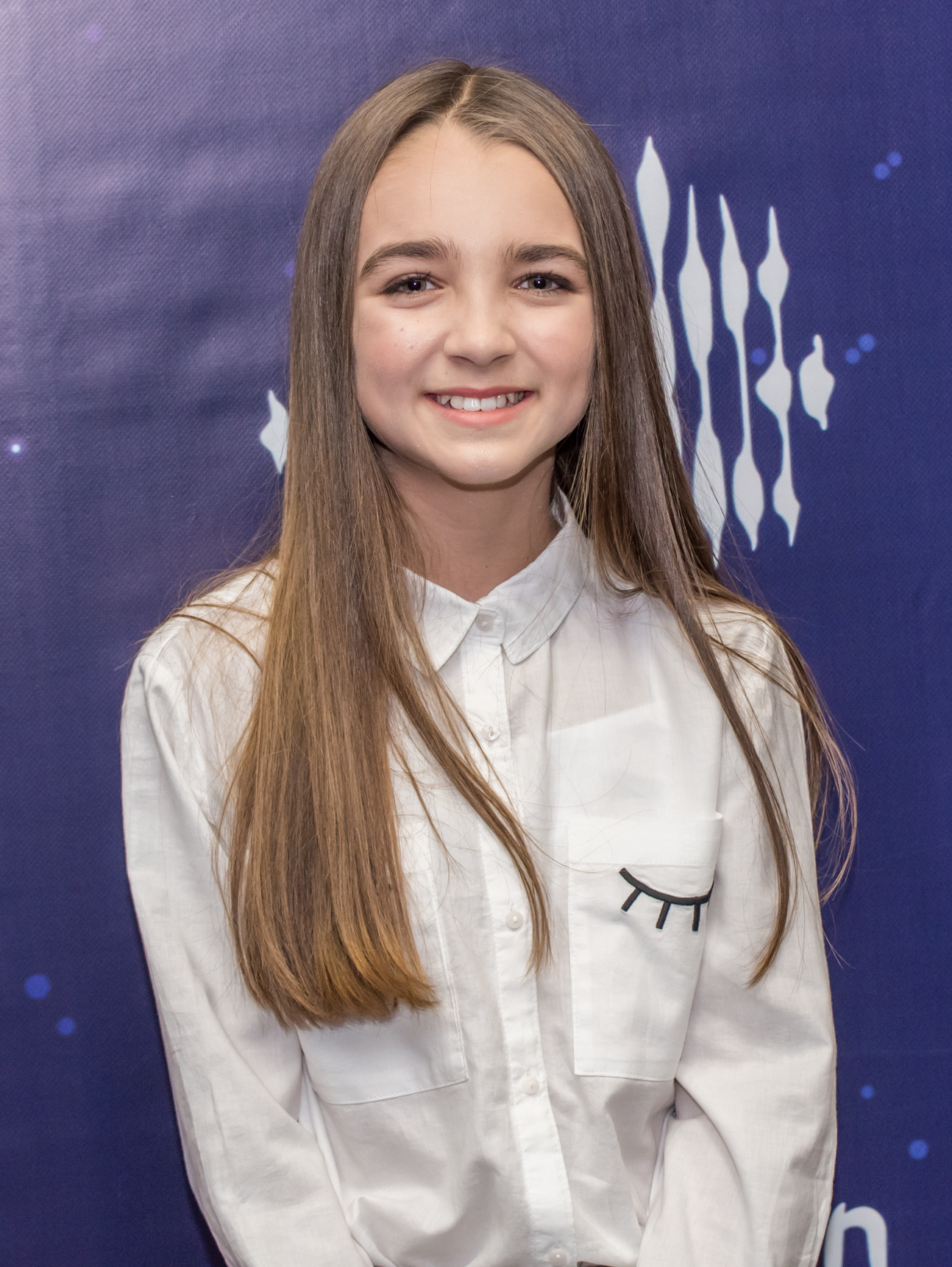
- Angelina at the Junior Eurovision 2018

Background information
- Born: Angélina Nava; 4 November 2006 (age 19); Provence, France
- Genres: Chanson, teen pop
- Occupation: Singer
- Years active: 2017–present
- Labels: MCA (Universal Music France)

Angélina Nava (born 4 November 2006), better known as Angelina, is a French singer. She achieved fame after winning the fourth French season of The Voice Kids. A year later, she represented her country at the 2018 Junior Eurovision Song Contest with the song "Jamais sans toi" ("Never Without You"), finishing second. In spring 2019, she released her debut album, Ma voie ("My Way"), with a song titled "Maman me dit" ("Mother Tells Me") as its lead single.

== Early life ==
Angelina grew up in La Ciotat in the Bouches-du-Rhône department of Southern France. Her father is Italian, and her mother is French. Her parents are dance teachers in La Ciotat.

== Career ==
None of Angelina's family members had any musical training, yet she was noted for her passion for singing and good vocal skills from a very young age. She especially liked to sing her favorite songs in the car, practically turning it into a music studio. At the age of five, Angelina performed in public at a charity event in Bouches-du-Rhône singing "Colors of the Wind" from the Disney animated film Pocahontas— an experience she now considers a defining moment, a "revelation".

=== The Voice Kids ===
Angelina always liked to watch the French version of The Voice Kids, and when she heard that there was going to be a casting for the show nearby, she decided to try her luck and was selected to perform in front of Bruno Berberes, The Voice casting director. Seven more preselection stages followed before she reached the blind audition. She was ten at the time. (That was the fourth season of the show and that would be televised from 19 August to 30 September 2017.)

For her blind audition, which became the first televised audition of the first episode, Angelina performed Synapson's "All in You". Before climbing on stage, she declared: "This is the greatest day of my whole life, and if a chair turns around, I'll be the happiest person in the world." When she got all three judges turning their chairs, she picked Patrick Fiori for her coach.

In the next round Fiori's Angelina, Eléa and Lara battled it out singing LP's "Lost on You", and it was Angelina who was chosen by the coach for the semifinal. In the semifinal, she sang Zazie's "J'envoie valser" ("I Send a Waltz"), becoming one of the two team members her coach chose for the final. (Another coach, M. Pokora, also suggested these two for the final, while Jenifer preferred Dylan and Cassidy.) In the live final, Angelina first sang Stromae's "Tous les mêmes" ("[They Are] All the Same") and then repeated her audition song, "All in You", and won.

Later in the same year, she joined the cast of Enfoirés Kids for their first and only concert, recorded at Zénith d'Aix on 19 November 2017 and broadcast by TF1 on 1 December.

=== 2018: Junior Eurovision Song Contest ===
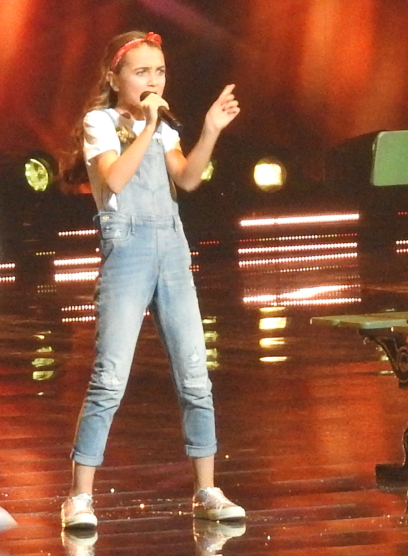
Angelina performs at the dress rehearsal ahead of the 2018 Eurovision Junior Song Contest

In 2018, Angelina was chosen to represent France with the song "Jamais sans toi" at that year's Junior Eurovision Song Contest, held in Minsk, Belarus, where she finished in second place with 203 points, 15 points behind the winner. The jury had her sixth, and the public second.

Angelina's performance at Junior Eurovision marked France's return to the contest after 14 years. (Before that, the country had participated only once, in 2004, when Thomas Pontier finished sixth with his song "Si on voulait bien" ("If We Wanted").) After Angelina's success, Eurovision France decided that France would participate the following year as well.

=== 2019: Debut album ===
In late March 2019, Angelina released a single titled "Maman me dit". On 26 April, she released her debut album, entitled Ma voie, which entered the French chart at number 84. In October she announced a tour for spring 2020.

=== 2021: Second album ===
On 21 November 2021, Angelina released a second album entitled Apparences.

== Musical influences ==
Angelina describes herself as a music addict. She listens to music all the time when not at school. The musicians she likes include Ariana Grande, Stromae, Amir and Bruno Mars. Also, at an early age her parents introduced her to salsa and jazz, and she has listened to the greatest names in these genres.

== Discography ==
=== Albums ===
| Album | Chart positions | | |
| Album | FRA | FRA Phys. | BEL (Wa) |
|---|---|---|---|
| Ma voie: Released: 26 April 2019; Label: MCA (Universal Music France) | 64 | 30 | 65 |
| Ma voie (Édition Collector): Released: 22 November 2019; Label: MCA (Universal Music France) | | | |
| Apparences: Released: 21 November 2021; Label: MCA (Universal Music France) | | | |

=== Singles ===
| Title | Year | Charts | Album |
| Title | Year | FRA | Album |
|---|---|---|---|
| "Jamais sans toi" | 2018 | — | Ma voie |
| "Maman me dit" | 2019 | — | Ma voie |
| "Qui dit mieux?" | 2019 | — | Ma voie (Édition Collector) |
| "Héros" | 2021 | — | Apparences |

Awards and achievements
| Preceded by Manuela Diaz | The Voice Kids (France) winner 2017 | Succeeded by Emma Cerchi |
| Preceded by Thomas Pontier with "Si on voulait bien" | France in the Junior Eurovision Song Contest; 2018 | Succeeded by Carla with "Bim bam toi" |
