= Bim bam toi =

2019 song by Carla Lazzari

Single by Carla

from the album L'autre moi
- Released: 11 October 2019
- Genre: Electropop
- Length: 2:55
- Label: MCA
- Songwriters: Igit, Barbara Pravi

Music video
- "Bim bam toi" on YouTube

Junior Eurovision Song Contest 2019 entry
- Country: France
- Artist: Carla Lazzari
- As: Carla
- Languages: French
- Composer: Igit
- Lyricist: Barbara Pravi

Finals performance
- Final result: 5th
- Final points: 169

Entry chronology
- ◄ "Jamais sans toi" (2018)
- "J'imagine" (2020) ►

"Bim bam toi" (English: Bim bam you) is a song by French singer Carla Lazzari that served as France's entry to the Junior Eurovision Song Contest 2019, held in Gliwice, Poland, on 24 November 2019. It was released on the MCA label as a single on 11 October.

In December 2019, the song went viral on TikTok and climbed to number one on the Spotify Top 50 Viral chart for France.

It was written by Barbara Pravi (who would later represent France at the Eurovision Song Contest 2021 in Rotterdam, Netherlands with the song "Voilà", in addition to writing the following year's winning French Junior Eurovision entry "J'imagine") and Igit, and produced by Julien Comblat.

== Background ==
"Bim bam toi" is an electropop song performed in French, the national language, with a few words in English. It tells the story of love at first sight. Carla sings:

J'ai beau tenter, rien ne perce
Depuis mes lèvres closes
Mais j'avoue, je confesse
Á l'intérieur, j'explose!
Et ça monte, ça monte, ça monte
Jusqu'à ce que mon petit coeur disjoncte

Translation:

No matter how I try, nothing comes out
From my closed lips
But I admit, I confess
Inside, I explode!
And it goes up, it goes up, it goes up
Until my little heart freaks out

With the chorus:

Et ça fait bim, bam, boum
Ça fait psht et ça fait vroum
Ça fait bim, bam, boum
Dans ma tête, y'a tout qui tourne

Translation:

And it goes bim, bam, boom
It goes psht and it goes vroom
It goes bim, bam, boom
In my head, everything is spinning around.

During the Junior Eurovision Song Contest 2019, it was the second song performed, after "We Will Rise" by Jordan Anthony (Australia) and just before "A Time for Us" by Tatiana Mezhentseva and Denberel Oorjak (Russia). Having obtained 85 points from the juries (sixth place) and 84 from the televoting (third place), Carla finished fifth with a total of 169 points.

External videos
- Juju Fitcats' TikTok video

As early as November, TikTok users were participating in the "Bim bam toi" challenge by uploading videos of themselves lip-syncing to the song. This went viral in France when Juju Fitcats, a YouTube fitness vlogger with more than a million followers, participated in the challenge in early December. In her video, Fitcats cheerfully sings the song while dancing in an airplane just before takeoff. It has garnered millions of views and has been parodied many times.

The song spent a couple of weeks at number one on the Spotify Top 50 Viral chart for France and continued to trend in the top three well into January.

Since February 2020, the official music video for "Bim bam toi" is the most-watched Junior Eurovision-related video on YouTube. The track also appeared as a Fortnite emote in October 2021.

== Track listing ==
Digital single
No.	Title	Writer(s)	Length
1.	"Bim bam toi" (Junior Eurovision 2019 / France)	Igit, Barbara Pravi	2:55

== Charts ==
Chart (2019–2020)	Peak position
Belgium (Ultratip Bubbling Under Wallonia)	13
France (SNEP)	111

== Certifications ==
Region	Certification	Certified units/sales
France (SNEP)	Platinum	200,000^{‡}
Poland (ZPAV)	Gold	25,000^{‡}
^{‡} Sales+streaming figures based on certification alone.
