= Junior Eurovision Song Contest 2019 =

International song competition for youth

- Share the Joy

Date and venue
- Final: 24 November 2019
- Venue: Gliwice Arena, Gliwice, Poland

Organisation
- Organiser: European Broadcasting Union (EBU)
- Executive supervisor: Jon Ola Sand

Production
- Host broadcaster: Telewizja Polska (TVP)
- Directors: Marcin Migalski; Tomasz Motyl
- Executive producer: Leszek Ratajczak
- Presenters: Ida Nowakowska; Aleksander Sikora; Roksana Węgiel

Participants
- Number of entries: 19
- Returning countries: Spain
- Non-returning countries: Azerbaijan; Israel
- Participation map: Competing countries Countries that participated in the past but not in 2019

Vote
- Voting system: The professional jury of each country awards a set of 12, 10, 8-1 points to 10 songs. Viewers around the world vote for 3-5 songs, and their votes are distributed proportionally. The votes of the jury and the audience make up 50% of all votes.
- Winning song: Poland "Superhero"

The Junior Eurovision Song Contest 2019 was the seventeenth edition of the Junior Eurovision Song Contest, held on 24 November 2019 at the Gliwice Arena in Gliwice, Poland, and presented by Ida Nowakowska, Aleksander Sikora, and Roksana Węgiel. It was organised by the European Broadcasting Union (EBU) and host broadcaster Telewizja Polska (TVP), who staged the event after winning the 2018 contest for Poland with the song "Anyone I Want to Be" by Roksana Węgiel. It was the first time that the contest was hosted in Poland, as well as the first Eurovision event to be held in the country since the Eurovision Young Dancers 2013.

Broadcasters from nineteen countries participated in the contest, with Spain taking part for the first time since 2006, while Azerbaijan and Israel did not return to the contest after having participated in 2018.

The winner was Poland with the song "Superhero" by Viki Gabor, making Poland the first country to win the Junior Eurovision Song Contest two years in a row as well as the first country to win on home soil. Kazakhstan placed second, their best result. Returning country Spain placed third. The Netherlands and France completed the top five.

== Location ==
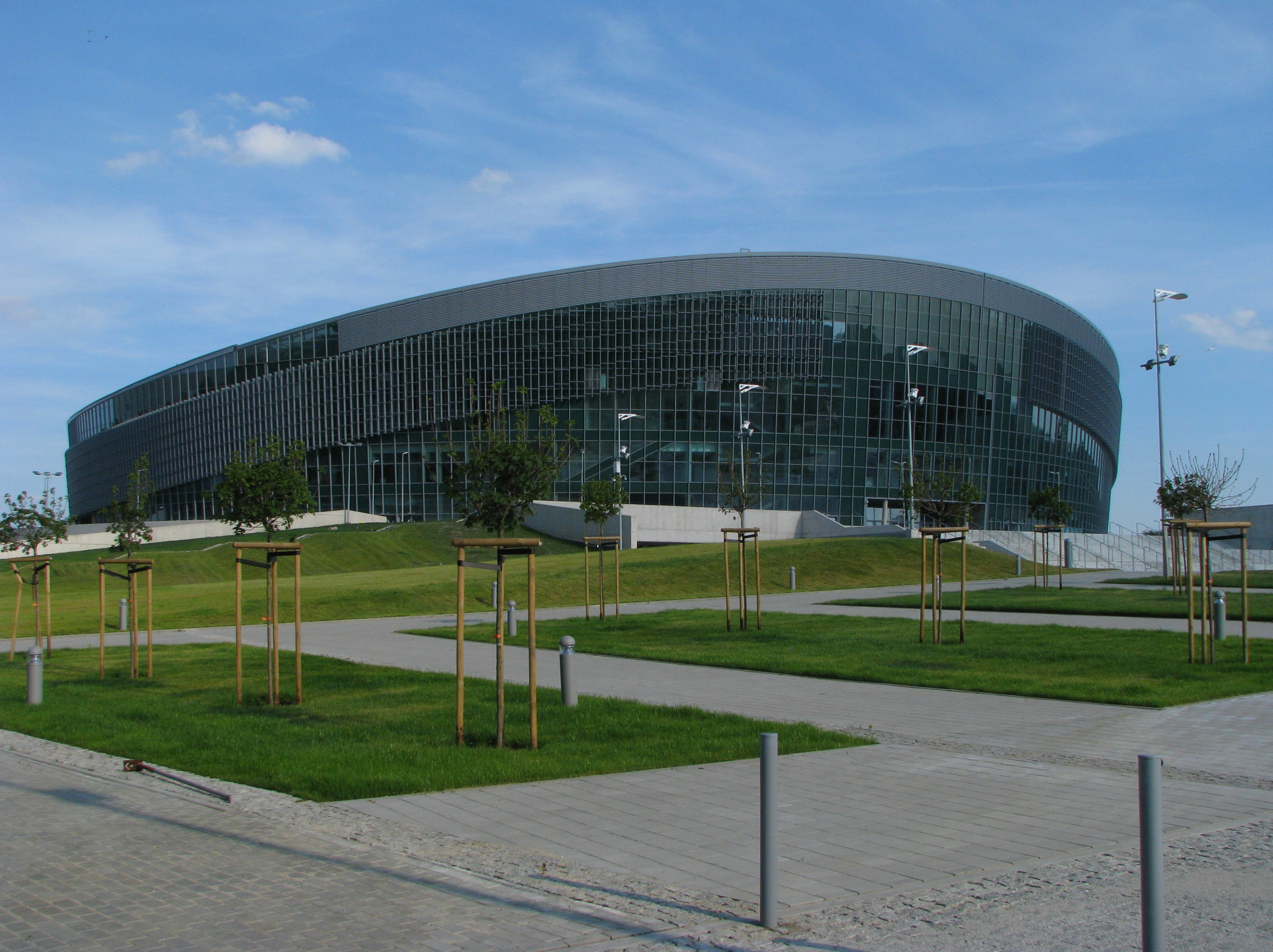
Gliwice Arena in Gliwice, venue of 2019 Junior Eurovision.

The 2019 contest took place in Poland for the first time, following the country's victory at the 2018 edition with the song "Anyone I Want to Be", performed by Roksana Węgiel. It was the sixth time that the contest had been hosted by the previous year's winning country. The contest took place in Gliwice Arena, a sport and entertainment hall with a capacity of 17,178 in the main arena. It is one of the largest indoor venues in the country.

=== Bidding phase and host city selection ===
Location of the host city (blue), shortlisted cities (green) and other bidding cities (red)

Prior to Poland's confirmation as host, two other countries had announced their intentions to host the event. These bids were from Armenia and Kazakhstan. Had the Kazakh proposal been accepted, it would've marked the first time an associate member was chosen to host an EBU flagship event. Kazakh broadcaster Khabar Agency said they would have moved the contest to October due to possible adverse weather conditions in the country's capital Astana, which was proposed as the host city. However, for this to happen, the general rules of the competition would have to be changed, because as in the adult competition, the competition cannot be held in a non-full member state of the EBU, even if the country in question is an effective participant of the contest.

After Poland's victory in the 2018 contest, the director-general of Polish broadcaster Telewizja Polska (TVP), Jacek Kurski, stated that the country would apply to host the event in 2019, and on 10 December 2018, it was confirmed by the EBU that Poland would host the 2019 contest.

Immediately following the final, Kurski stated that Warsaw would not host as it does not have a suitable venue to host an event of this size, marking the first time since the 2014 contest that the event is not hosted in the host country's capital. On 18 January 2019, in an interview for TVP Info, Director-General of the EBU Noel Curran stated that the contest would be held in Kraków, however the same day TVP issued a statement that the city had not yet been chosen. In February 2019 it was revealed that three cities remained in the race: Gliwice, Szczecin and Toruń, and that all of the bids were approved by the EBU, meaning that the final decision regarding the host was exclusively up to the host broadcaster. On 6 March 2019, during a press conference held by TVP and the EBU, it was confirmed that the contest would be held in Gliwice in cooperation with the Silesian Voivodeship.

Key: † Host venue ‡ Shortlisted

City	Venue	Notes	Ref.
Gdańsk	Ergo Arena	The venue was reportedly booked during the planned start of the preparations.	
Gliwice †	Gliwice Arena	Candidacy supported by the MP for the city of Gliwice, Jarosław Gonciarz, who made an official call to TVP to select Gliwice as the host city.	
Katowice	Spodek	The venue can hold around 11,500 spectators, although in practice this number is limited to between 8 and 10 thousand due to stage set-up obscuring the view.	
Katowice	International Congress Centre	Consists of multiple halls, with the capacity ranging from 100 to 10,000.	
Kraków	Tauron Arena Kraków	The largest and most modern entertainment and sports venue in Poland with a capacity of up to 22,000 spectators. Hosted the 2014 FIVB Volleyball Men's World Championship tournament.	
Łódź	Atlas Arena	—	
Szczecin ‡	Netto Arena	Candidacy supported by the Szczecin Agency of Arts.	
Toruń ‡	Arena Toruń	—	

== Participants ==
On 18 July 2019, 19 countries were confirmed to be participating in the contest. Spain returned to the contest, marking their first appearance since 2006. Azerbaijan and Israel both withdrew after returning to the contest for one-off appearances in 2018.

Prior to the event, a digital compilation album featuring all the songs from the 2019 contest was put together by the European Broadcasting Union and released by Universal Music Group on 8 November 2019.

Participants of the Junior Eurovision Song Contest 2019
Country	Broadcaster	Artist	Song	Language	Songwriter(s)
Albania	RTSH	Isea Çili	"Mikja ime fëmijëri"	Albanian	Saimir Çili; Jorgo Papingji
Armenia	AMPTV	Karina Ignatyan	"Colours of Your Dream"	Armenian, English	Avet Barseghyan; Taras Demchuk; Margarita Doroshevich
Australia	ABC	Jordan Anthony	"We Will Rise"	English	Jordan Anthony; MSquared
Belarus	BTRC	Liza Misnikova	"Pepelny (Ashen)" (Пепельный)	Russian, English	Kirill Good; Liza Misnikova; Natalya Tambovtseva
France	France Télévisions	Carla	"Bim bam toi"	French	Igit; Barbara Pravi
Georgia	GPB	Giorgi Rostiashvili	"We Need Love"	Georgian, English	David Evgenidze
Ireland	TG4	Anna Kearney	"Banshee"	Irish	Anna Banks; Cyprian Cassar; Daniel Caruana; Jonas Gladnikoff; Anna Kearney; Fiachna Ó Braonáin; Niall Mooney
Italy	RAI	Marta Viola	"La voce della terra"	Italian, English	Emilio di Stefano; Franco Fasano; Marco Iardella; Fabrizio Palaferri
Kazakhstan	KA	Yerzhan Maxim	"Armanyńnan qalma" (Арманыңнан қалма)	Kazakh, English	Timur Balymbetov; Aldabergenov Daniyar; Khamit Shangaliyev
Malta	PBS	Eliana Gomez Blanco	"We Are More"	English, Maltese	Joe Julian Farrugia; Kevin Lee; Jonas Thander; Rachel Suter
Netherlands	AVROTROS	Matheu	"Dans met jou"	Dutch, English	Willem Laseroms; Jermain van der Bogt
North Macedonia	MRT	Mila Moskov	"Fire"	Macedonian, English	Magdalena Cvetkoska; Lazar Cvetkoski
Poland	TVP	Viki Gabor	"Superhero"	Polish, English (Note: American Sign Language was also used during the live televised performance.)	Dominic Buczkowski-Wojtaszek; Patryk Kumór; Małgorzata Uściłowska
Portugal	RTP	Joana Almeida	"Vem comigo (Come with Me)"	Portuguese, English	João Pedro Coimbra
Russia	VGTRK	Tatyana Mezhentseva and Denberel Oorzhak	"A Time for Us"	Russian, English	Dmitry Northman
Serbia	RTS	Darija Vračević	"Podigni glas (Raise Your Voice)" (Подигни глас)	Serbian, English	Aleksandra Milutinović; Aleksandar Sablić; Darija Vračević; Leontina Vukomanović
Spain	RTVE	Melani García	"Marte"	Spanish	Manu Chalud; Pablo Mora
Ukraine	UA:PBC	Sophia Ivanko	"The Spirit of Music"	Ukrainian, English	Sophia Ivanko; Mykhailo Tolmachov
Wales	S4C	Erin Mai	"Calon yn curo (Heart Beating)"	Welsh	John Gregory; Ed Holden; Sylvia Strand

== Format ==
=== Visual design ===
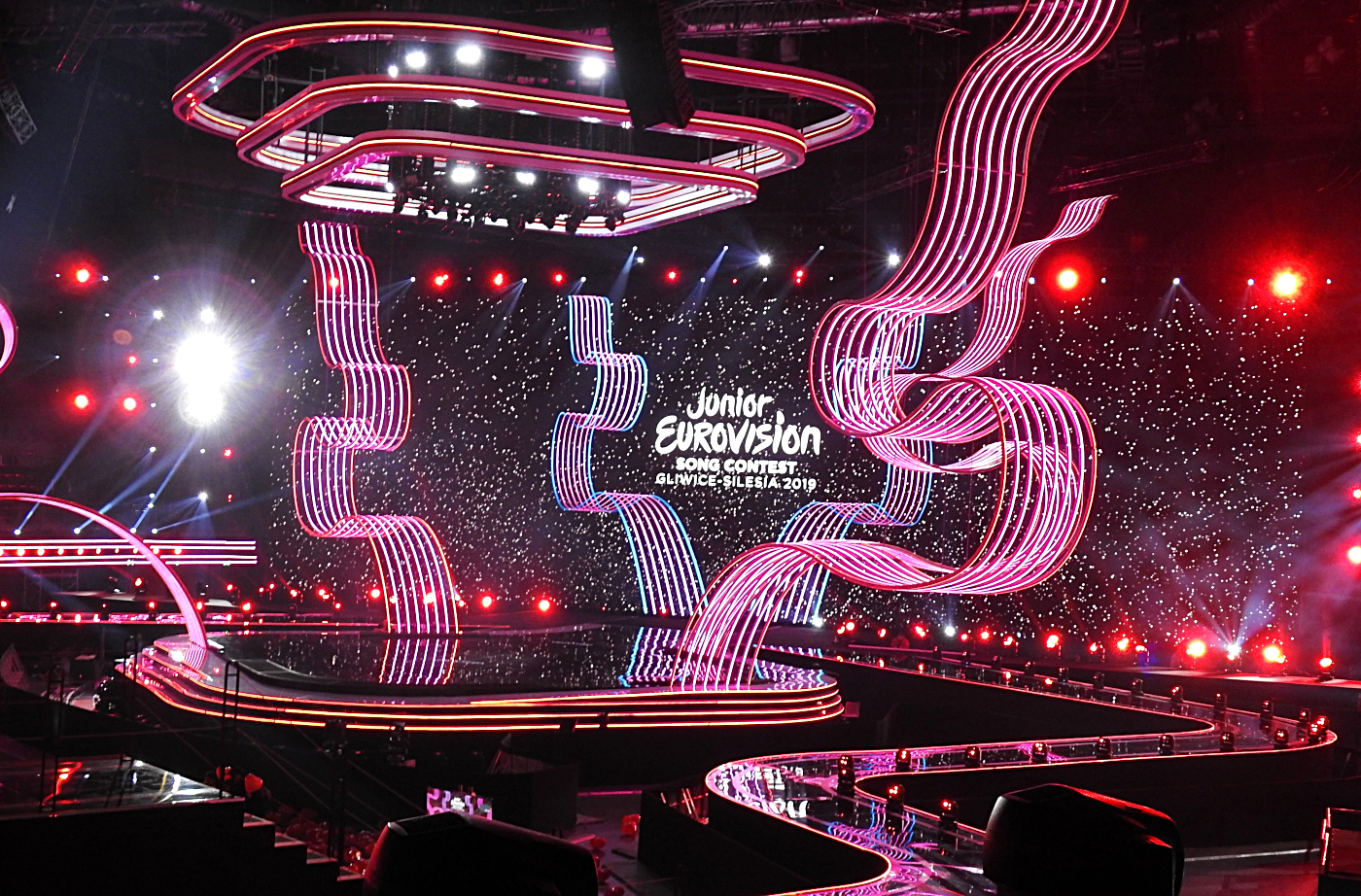
The stage of the Junior Eurovision Song Contest 2019

The theme for the contest, Share the Joy, was revealed on 13 May 2019 during a press conference prior to the Eurovision Song Contest 2019 in Tel Aviv, Israel. The press conference included Gert Kark (Project Manager), Konrad Smuga (Creative Director), Marta Piekarska (Project Coordinator) and Roksana Węgiel, the winner of the 2018 contest. The logo features a brightly coloured kite to symbolize "freedom, light and shared joyous moments." The creative concept represents "how working together makes us better, stronger and can bring joy and happiness as we celebrate the beautiful things in life."

The trophy was designed by Kjell Engman of the Swedish glass company Kosta Boda, using the same design as was first introduced in the 2017 contest. The main trophy is a glass microphone with colored lines inside the upper part, which symbolize the flow of sound.

=== Postcards ===
Each postcard took place in a different location in Poland. They all began with a short clip of the upcoming performer looking through a telescope at their postcard's location. A group of people performing an activity in the said location was then shown. This activity was also included as a hashtag at the bottom of the screen. At completion of the activity, the upcoming performer is shown moving a digital kite (the logo of the contest) decorated with their country's flag, signalling the commencement of their performance.

- Albania – Market Square, Gliwice
- Armenia – Victoria Theatre, Gliwice
- Australia – Queen Louise Adit Complex, Zabrze
- Belarus – Żar
- France – Palmiarnia Miejska, Gliwice
- Georgia – Bielsko-Biała
- Ireland – Neumann's Villa, Gliwice
- Italy – Silesian Opera, Bytom
- Kazakhstan – Żywiec Lake
- Malta – Silesian University of Technology, Gliwice
- Netherlands – Koszęcin Palace, Koszęcin
- North Macedonia – Paprocany Lake, Tychy
- Poland – Stadion Śląski, Chorzów
- Portugal – Nikiszowiec
- Russia – Villa Caro, Gliwice
- Serbia – Czantoria Wielka, Ustroń
- Spain – Pszczyna Castle, Pszczyna
- Ukraine – Muzeum Ognia, Żory
- Wales – Ogrodzieniec Castle

=== Presenters ===
On 22 August 2019, it was announced that Ida Nowakowska, Aleksander Sikora and the previous year's winner Roksana Węgiel would host the 2019 contest. Węgiel is the first former winner to host an edition of the contest as well as the fifth person under the age of 16 to do so. Nowakowska is a Polish-American digital influencer, while Sikora is a breakfast television host.

Additionally, on 24 September 2019, journalists and TV hosts Agata Konarska and Mateusz Szymkowiak were confirmed as the hosts for the Opening Ceremony, which took place on 18 November in Silesian Theatre in Katowice, the capital city of the host region of Silesia. Konarska previously hosted the Eurovision Young Dancers 2005 in Warsaw.

== Contest overview ==
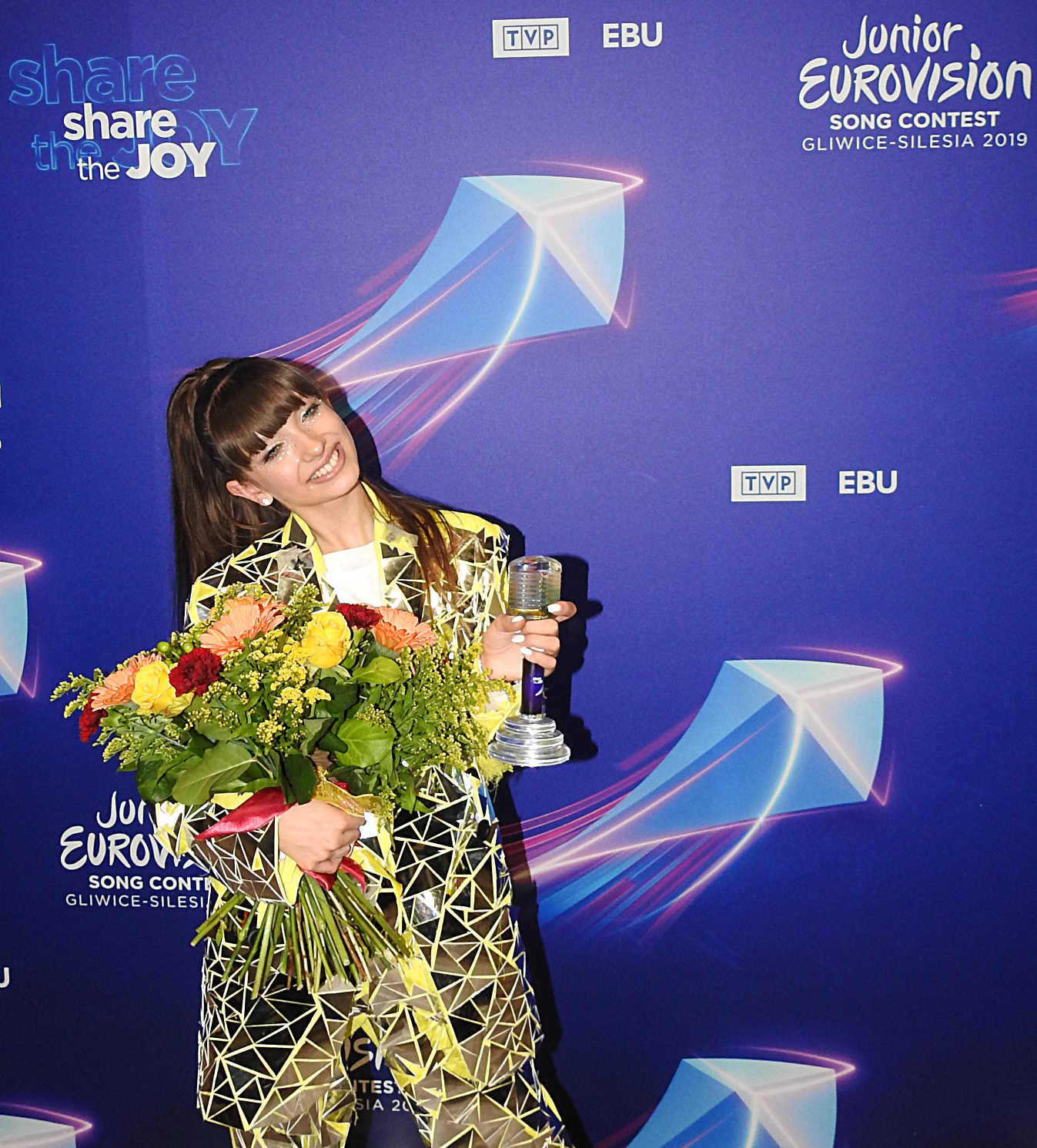
Viki Gabor with the winner's trophy.

The event took place on 24 November 2019 at 16:00 CET. Nineteen countries participated, with the running order published on 18 November 2019. All the countries competing were eligible to vote with the jury vote, as well as participating and non-participating countries under an aggregated international online vote, eligible to vote. Poland won with 278 points, also winning the online vote. Kazakhstan came second with 227 points and won the jury vote, with Spain, the Netherlands and France completing the top five. Ukraine, Portugal, Albania, Wales and Malta occupied the bottom five positions.

The opening of the show featured the traditional flag parade, accompanied by theme music created by Polish DJ Gromee, who represented the country in the Eurovision Song Contest 2018. During the interval, Roksana Węgiel performed her winning song "Anyone I Want to Be". All participants then joined on stage for a rendition of the common song, "Share the Joy", which was followed by a dance routine by host Ida Nowakowska inspired by the competition's slogan.

R/O	Country	Artist	Song	Points	Place
1	Australia	Jordan Anthony	"We Will Rise"	121	8
2	France	Carla	"Bim bam toi"	169	5
3	Russia	Tatyana Mezhentseva and Denberel Oorzhak	"A Time for Us"	72	13
4	North Macedonia	Mila Moskov	"Fire"	150	6
5	Spain	Melani García	"Marte"	212	3
6	Georgia	Giorgi Rostiashvili	"We Need Love"	69	14
7	Belarus	Liza Misnikova	"Pepelny (Ashen)"	92	11
8	Malta	Eliana Gomez Blanco	"We Are More"	29	19
9	Wales	Erin Mai	"Calon yn curo (Heart Beating)"	35	18
10	Kazakhstan	Yerzhan Maxim	"Armanyńnan qalma"	227	2
11	Poland	Viki Gabor	"Superhero"	278	1
12	Ireland	Anna Kearney	"Banshee"	73	12
13	Ukraine	Sophia Ivanko	"The Spirit of Music"	59	15
14	Netherlands	Matheu	"Dans met jou"	186	4
15	Armenia	Karina Ignatyan	"Colours of Your Dream"	115	9
16	Portugal	Joana Almeida	"Vem comigo (Come with Me)"	43	16
17	Italy	Marta Viola	"La voce della terra"	129	7
18	Albania	Isea Çili	"Mikja ime fëmijëri"	36	17
19	Serbia	Darija Vračević	"Podigni glas (Raise Your Voice)"	109	10

=== Spokespersons ===
The following people announced the jury 12 points for their respective country:

1. Australia – Szymon
2. France – Karolina
3. Russia – Alisa Khilko and Khryusha
4. North Macedonia – Magdalena
5. Spain – Violeta Leal
6. Georgia – Anastasia Garsevanishvili
7. Belarus – Emilia Niewinskaja
8. Malta – Paula
9. Wales – Cadi Morgan
10. Kazakhstan – Aruzhan Khafiz
11. Poland – Marianna Józefina Piątkowska
12. Ireland – Leo Kearney
13. Ukraine – Darina Krasnovetska
14. Netherlands – Anne Buhre
15. Armenia – Erik Antonyan
16. Portugal – Zofia
17. Italy – Maria Iside Fiore
18. Albania – Efi Gjika
19. Serbia – Bojana Radovanović

== Detailed voting results ==
Split results
Place	Combined		Jury		Online Vote	
Place	Country	Points	Country	Points	Country	Points
1	Poland	278	Kazakhstan	148	Poland	166
2	Kazakhstan	227	Poland	112	Spain	104
3	Spain	212	Spain	108	France	84
4	Netherlands	186	Netherlands	105	Netherlands	81
5	France	169	North Macedonia	100	Kazakhstan	79
6	North Macedonia	150	France	85	Italy	64
7	Italy	129	Australia	82	Serbia	63
8	Australia	121	Armenia	70	Russia	57
9	Armenia	115	Italy	65	North Macedonia	50
10	Serbia	109	Serbia	46	Belarus	48
11	Belarus	92	Belarus	44	Armenia	45
12	Ireland	73	Ireland	39	Portugal	43
13	Russia	72	Georgia	37	Australia	39
14	Georgia	69	Ukraine	28	Ireland	34
15	Ukraine	59	Russia	15	Georgia	32
16	Portugal	43	Wales	9	Ukraine	31
17	Albania	36	Albania	7	Albania	29
18	Wales	35	Malta	2	Malta	27
19	Malta	29	Portugal	0	Wales	26

Detailed voting results
Voting procedure used: 100% jury vote 100% online vote		Total score	Jury vote score	Online vote score	Jury vote																		
Voting procedure used: 100% jury vote 100% online vote		Total score	Jury vote score	Online vote score	Australia	France	Russia	North Macedonia	Spain	Georgia	Belarus	Malta	Wales	Kazakhstan	Poland	Ireland	Ukraine	Netherlands	Armenia	Portugal	Italy	Albania	Serbia
Contestants	Australia	121	82	39			12		1	8	4	8		8	10	1	10	6	5		2		7
Contestants	France	169	85	84	10			1	5		6	6	10	2	1	5		10	1	7	8	5	8
Contestants	Russia	72	15	57										3					10	2			
Contestants	North Macedonia	150	100	50	4	1	7		2	10	5	12	2		7	10	7	7	3	10	4	7	2
Contestants	Spain	212	108	104	1	8		10			7	4	7	7	8	8	6	5		8	12	12	5
Contestants	Georgia	69	37	32	5			3				1	8		5				8			3	4
Contestants	Belarus	92	44	48	6	3			6			3			2	7		1	6		10		
Contestants	Malta	29	2	27									1										1
Contestants	Wales	35	9	26						3											6		
Contestants	Kazakhstan	227	148	79	7	2	8	5	8	12	12	7	12		12	2	12	12	4	6	7	8	12
Contestants	Poland	278	112	166		10	1	7	12	4	10	10	6	12		4	8	8		5	3	2	10
Contestants	Ireland	73	39	34		4	6	2	3				5	10			3	2		3	1		
Contestants	Ukraine	59	28	31	3						8			6					7			1	3
Contestants	Netherlands	186	105	81	12	12	4	4	10	5		5			6	6	2		12	12	5	10	
Contestants	Armenia	115	70	45	8	5	10	6	7	7	3	2		5	3		4			4		6	
Contestants	Portugal	43	0	43																			
Contestants	Italy	129	65	64	2	7	2	8		6	2		3	1	4	12	5	4	2	1			6
Contestants	Albania	36	7	29			5			2													
Contestants	Serbia	109	46	63		6	3	12	4	1	1		4	4		3	1	3				4	

=== 12 points ===
Below is a summary of all 12 points received from each country's professional juries.

N.	Contestant	Nation(s) giving 12 points
7	Kazakhstan	Belarus, Georgia, Netherlands, Poland, Serbia, Ukraine, Wales
4	Netherlands	Armenia, Australia, France, Portugal
2	Poland	Kazakhstan, Spain
2	Spain	Albania, Italy
1	Australia	Russia
1	Italy	Ireland
1	North Macedonia	Malta
1	Serbia	North Macedonia

=== Online voting ===
Online voting results
Contestant	Votes	Points
Poland	~567,895	166
Spain	~355,789	104
France	~287,368	84
Netherlands	~277,105	81
Kazakhstan	~270,263	79
Italy	~218,947	64
Serbia	~216,000	63
Russia	~195,000	57
North Macedonia	~171,053	50
Belarus	~164,211	48
Armenia	~153,947	45
Portugal	~147,105	43
Australia	~133,000	39
Ireland	~116,421	34
Georgia	~109,474	32
Ukraine	~106,053	31
Albania	~99,211	29
Malta	~92,368	27
Wales	~88,947	26
Total	~3,770,000	

== Broadcasts ==
Broadcasters and commentators in participating countries
Country	Broadcaster(s)	Channel(s)	Commentator(s)	Ref.
Albania	RTSH	Unknown	Andri Xhahu	
Armenia	ARMTV	Armenia 1	Avet Barseghyan and Mane Grigoryan	
Australia	ABC	ABC Me	Pip Rasmussen, Ava Madon and Drew Parker	
Belarus	BTRC	Belarus 1, Belarus 24	Evgeny Perlin	
France	France Télévisions	France 2	Stéphane Bern and Sandy Héribert	
Georgia	GPB	1TV	Demetre Ergemlidze and Tamar Edilashvili	
Ireland	TG4	TG4	Sinéad Ní Uallacháin	
Italy	Rai	Rai Gulp	Mario Acampa and Alexia Rizzardi	
Kazakhstan	Khabar Agency	Khabar TV	Kaldybek Zhaisanbai and Mahabbat Esen	
Malta	PBS	TVM	No commentary	
Netherlands	AVROTROS (via NPO)	NPO Zapp	Buddy Vedder	
North Macedonia	MRT	MRT 1	Eli Tanaskovska	
Poland	TVP	TVP1, TVP Polonia, TVP ABC, TVP Wilno	Artur Orzech	
Portugal	RTP	Live: RTP1, RTP Internacional; Delayed: RTP Internacional Ásia, RTP África	Nuno Galopim	
Russia	C1R, VGTRK	Carousel	Anton Zorkin	
Russia	NTV		Vadim Takmenev and Lera Kudryavtseva	
Serbia	RTS	RTS 2	Tijana Lukić	
Spain	RTVE	La 1, TVE Internacional	Tony Aguilar, Julia Varela and Víctor Escudero	
Ukraine	UA:PBC (Suspil'ne)	UA:First, UA:Kultura, UA:PBC regional channels	Timur Miroshnychenko	
Wales	S4C		Welsh: Trystan Ellis-Morris, English: Stifyn Parri	

Broadcasters and commentators in non-participating countries
Country	Broadcaster(s)	Channel(s)	Commentator(s)	Ref.
Israel	KAN	Unknown		
United Kingdom	Fun Kids		Ewan Spence	

== See also ==
- Eurovision Choir 2019
- Eurovision Song Contest 2019
