= Stand by You =

Stand by You may refer to:

- "Stand by You" (Mai Kuraki song), 2014
- "Stand by You" (Marlisa song), 2014
- "Stand by You" (Rachel Platten song), 2015
- "Stand by You", a song by S.O.A.P., released in 1997
- "Stand by You", a song by S Club 7 (a cover of the S.O.A.P. song), a B-side of the 2000 single "Never Had a Dream Come True"
- "Stand by You", a song by Anna Gjebrea representing Albania in the Junior Eurovision Song Contest 2021
- "Stand by You", a song by SKE48, 2018
- Stand by You, a 2021 television special featuring Miley Cyrus

May also refer to:

- I’ll Stand By You (disambiguation)

== See also ==
- I'll Stand by You (disambiguation)
- Stand by Me (disambiguation)
