= I'll Stand by You (disambiguation) =

"I'll Stand by You" is a 1994 song by the Pretenders.

I'll Stand by You may also refer to:

- "I'll Stand by You", a song from Wings (Bonnie Tyler album), 2006
- "I'll Stand by You", a song by Bruce Springsteen, used for Blinded by the Light (2019 film)

May also refer to:

- Stand By You (disambiguation)

== See also ==
- Stand by You (disambiguation)
- Stand by Me (disambiguation)
