= Netherlands in the Junior Eurovision Song Contest 2021 =

2021 Junior Eurovision participation

- Junior Eurovision Song Contest 2021
- Country: Netherlands
- Selection process: Junior Songfestival 2021
- Selection date: 25 September 2021

Competing entry
- Song: "Mata Sugu Aō Ne"
- Artist: Ayana
- Songwriters: Ferry Lagendijk

Placement
- Final result: 19th, 43 points

Participation chronology

The Netherlands was represented at the Junior Eurovision Song Contest 2021 in Paris, France. National broadcaster AVROTROS selected Ayana to represent the Netherlands through the national final Junior Songfestival 2021. With her song "Mata Sugu Aō Ne", containing lyrics in Dutch, English and Japanese, she finished in 19th place at the Junior Eurovision Song Contest with 43 points.

== Background ==
Prior to the 2021 contest, the Netherlands had participated in the Junior Eurovision Song Contest in every edition since its first entry in 2003. The Netherlands have won the contest on one occasion: in 2009 with the song "Click Clack", performed by Ralf Mackenbach. In the 2020 contest, girl group UNITY represented the Netherlands with the song "Best Friends". Although the host country was Poland, their performance was recorded remotely in a television studio in the Netherlands due to the COVID-19 pandemic. They placed 4th out of 12 entries with 132 points, while France won the contest with 200 points.

== Before Junior Eurovision ==
=== Junior Songfestival 2021 ===
AVROTROS selected the Dutch representative through the televised national final Junior Songfestival that was held on 25 September 2021 at the RTM Stage, a part of the Rotterdam Ahoy, hosted by Romy Monteiro and Buddy Vedder. The winner was determined through points given by a kids jury, a professional jury and public voting, each having equal weight. The kids jury consisted of Junior Songfestival 2020 winners Unity and finalists Robin de Haas and Jackie & Janae, and the professional jury consisted of Jeangu Macrooy, Emma Heesters and Rolf Sanchez.

==== Competing entries ====
Following the 2020 edition of the contest, the submissions process had been opened for singers who want to represent the Netherlands in the 2021 contest. Following a call for participants which closed in December, NPO Zapp revealed the list of singers who have made it through to the auditions round in January 2021. The list of finalists was revealed on 4 June 2021. The finalists were then grouped into four acts. These acts can be soloists, duos or groups. Each act then worked on their entry for the Junior Songfestival final, accompanied by professional songwriters. The exact groupings of the acts was revealed a week later on the official Junior Songfestival YouTube channel.

Artist	Song	Songwriter(s)	Language(s)	Release date	Ref.
Ayana	"Mata sugu aō ne" (またすぐ会おうね)	Ferry Lagendijk	Dutch, English, Japanese	23 June 2021	
Melody	"Niet wat vrienden doen"	Adriaan Philipse, Jeroen Rietbergen, Julian Vahle, Maxine van Breukelen	Dutch, English	30 June 2021	
Priscilla	"Be Alright"	Jermain van der Bogt, Willem Laseroms	Dutch, English	7 July 2021	
Shine	"A Million Little Things"	Robert Dorn	Dutch, English	14 July 2021	

==== Final ====
The final took place on 25 September 2021. Audience members were required to take a COVID-19 test before entering the auditorium. During the online voting window, the finalists performed a common theme song titled "Let's Sing Together". At the end of the show, Ayana, a Dutch singer of Japanese and British descent, was selected with the song "Mata Sugu Aō Ne". The final was watched by a total of 401,000 viewers, and was the third most-watched show on NPO3 the day of the broadcast. Overall, the show had an average of 142,000 viewers with a share of 3.9%. The average number of viewers fell by 19,000 viewers compared to 2020, however, the market share increased by 0.2%.

Final – 25 September 2021
Draw	Artist	Song	Kids jury	Prof. jury	Online vote	Total	Place
1	Priscilla	"Be Alright"	9	9	8	26	4
2	Shine	"A Million Little Things"	10	8	12	30	2
3	Ayana	"Mata sugu aō ne"	12	12	9	33	1
4	Melody	"Niet wat vrienden doen"	8	10	10	28	3

== At Junior Eurovision ==
After the opening ceremony, which took place on 13 December 2021, it was announced that Netherlands would perform fifteenth on 19 December 2021, following Azerbaijan and preceding Spain.

At the end of the contest, Netherlands received 43 points, placing last out of 19 participating countries, making it the worst result the Netherlands achieved since the contest's inception.

=== Voting ===
The same voting system that was introduced in the 2017 edition was used, where the results were determined by 50% online voting and 50% jury voting. Every participating broadcaster assembled a national jury that consisted of three music industry professionals and two children aged between 10 and 15 who were citizens of the country they represented. The rankings of those jurors were combined to make an overall top ten.

The online voting consisted of two phases. The first phase of the online voting began on 17 December 2021 when a recap of all the rehearsal performances was shown on the contest's website Junioreurovision.tv before the viewers could vote. After this, voters also had the option to watch longer one-minute clips from each participant's rehearsal. This first round of voting ended on 17 December at 15:59 CET. The second phase of the online voting took place during the live show and began right after the last performance and was open for 15 minutes. International viewers were able vote for three songs. They were also able to vote for their own country's song. These votes were then turned into points which were determined by the percentage of votes received. For example, if a song received 10% of the votes, it received 10% of the available points.

Points awarded to the Netherlands
Score	Country
12 points	
10 points	
8 points	
7 points	
6 points	
5 points	
4 points	Italy
3 points	Ukraine
2 points	
1 point	Kazakhstan; Serbia
The Netherlands received 34 points from the online vote

Points awarded by the Netherlands
Score	Country
12 points	France
10 points	Poland
8 points	Azerbaijan
7 points	Armenia
6 points	Italy
5 points	Georgia
4 points	Spain
3 points	Russia
2 points	Ukraine
1 point	Albania

==== Detailed voting results ====
Detailed voting results from the Netherlands
Draw	Country	Juror A	Juror B	Juror C	Juror D	Juror E	Rank	Points
01	Germany	13	11	17	12	11	16	
02	Georgia	10	2	10	10	4	6	5
03	Poland	7	6	5	1	2	2	10
04	Malta	3	14	14	13	12	11	
05	Italy	9	3	3	6	9	5	6
06	Bulgaria	17	15	16	15	10	17	
07	Russia	2	12	9	7	8	8	3
08	Ireland	16	9	6	16	18	14	
09	Armenia	14	10	1	4	6	4	7
10	Kazakhstan	8	17	12	11	5	12	
11	Albania	5	5	13	9	16	10	1
12	Ukraine	6	4	11	8	17	9	2
13	France	1	1	2	5	1	1	12
14	Azerbaijan	11	18	4	2	3	3	8
15	Netherlands							
16	Spain	12	7	7	3	7	7	4
17	Serbia	15	16	8	14	13	15	
18	North Macedonia	4	8	15	17	15	13	
19	Portugal	18	13	18	18	14	18	
