= Russia in the Junior Eurovision Song Contest 2021 =

- Junior Eurovision Song Contest 2021
- Country: Russia
- Selection process: Akademiya Eurovision 2021
- Selection date: 26 October 2021 (Note: Akademiya Eurovision 2021 was aired on 30 October, however, the winner was revealed the same day it was recorded.)

Competing entry
- Song: "Mon ami"
- Artist: Tanya Mezhentseva
- Songwriters: Danu Boian; Dmitriy Korochin; Tanya Mezhentseva

Placement
- Final result: 7th, 124 points

Participation chronology

Russia was represented at the Junior Eurovision Song Contest 2021 which took place on 19 December 2021, in Paris, France. The Russian broadcaster All-Russia State Television and Radio Broadcasting Company (VGTRK) was responsible for organising their entry for the contest.

As of 2026, this was Russia's final entry at the contest, as well as its final appearance in any Eurovision event, before the country was expelled from the EBU the following year in the wake of its invasion of Ukraine.

== Background ==
Prior to the 2021 contest, Russia had participated in the Junior Eurovision Song Contest 16 times since its debut in 2005. Russia has won the contest twice: in 2006 with the song "Vesenniy jazz" performed by the Tolmachevy Twins, and in 2017 with the song "Wings" performed by Polina Bogusevich. In the 2020 contest, Russia was represented by the song "My New Day" performed by Sofia Feskova. The song placed 10th in a field of 12 countries with 88 points.

== Before Junior Eurovision ==
=== Akademiya Eurovision 2021 ===
The Russian broadcaster, VGTRK, announced on 20 January 2021 that they would be participating at the 2021 contest, taking place in Paris, France, on 19 December 2021. The national selection took place on 30 October 2021. Submissions for entrants were open between 20 January to 20 September, with the audition stage taking place in the Russian capital, Moscow on 30 September 2021 and featured 69 entries selected from a record of 600 received submissions. VGTRK announced on 14 October 2021 that a total of twelve artists would be competing in the national final.

==== Final ====
The national selection final to select the entrant for Russia was recorded on 26 October 2021, and was televised later on 30 October. The winner was determined by a voting split of 50% jury members and 50% internet voting, which was open between 20 and 25 October. Tanya Mezhentseva won the national final with the song "Mon ami". She previously represented Russia in the Junior Eurovision Song Contest 2019 with Denberel Oorzhak and their song "A Time for Us". "Mon ami" was composed by Alexander Broshovyan, and lyricised by Danu Boian, Dmitriy Korochin and Tanya Mezhentseva. The jury consisted of three adult members: Manizha (2021 Russian Eurovision entrant), Yulia Savicheva (2004 Russian Eurovision entrant) and Ekaterina Orlova (Head of Delegation for Russia at the Junior Eurovision Song Contest), and two kids members: Ekaterina Maneshina and Valery Kuzakov.

Final – 30 October 2021
| Draw | Artist | Song | Jury | Online vote | Total | Place |
|---|---|---|---|---|---|---|
| 1 | Murad Hushlaev | "Naivnaya" (Наивная) | 18 | 10 | 28 | 11 |
| 2 | Lol&Pop | "Tantsuy" (Танцуй) | 18 | 30 | 48 | 6 |
| 3 | Yulia Gavrilova | "Moyo imya Lyubov" (Моё имя Любовь) | 35 | 32 | 67 | 2 |
| 4 | Liza Trofimova | "Zachot" (Зачёт) | 43 | 1 | 44 | 7 |
| 5 | Masha Gulevich | "Moy mir" (Мой мир) | 13 | 50 | 63 | 4 |
| 6 | Polina Etchik | "Vremya mechtat" (Время мечтать) | 8 | 30 | 38 | 8 |
| 7 | Nikita Varentsov | "7.40" | 8 | 6 | 14 | 12 |
| 8 | Saniya Taniya | "Zakruzhit" (Закружит) | 25 | 12 | 37 | 9 |
| 9 | Tanya Mezhentseva | "Mon ami" | 36 | 54 | 90 | 1 |
| 10 | Ochechi | "Siyay" (Сияй) | 3 | 50 | 53 | 5 |
| 11 | Sofia Fomenko | "Hey Mom" | 30 | 1 | 31 | 10 |
| 12 | Andrey Drobyshev | "100 dorog" (100 дорог) | 53 | 14 | 67 | 3 |

== At Junior Eurovision ==
After the opening ceremony, which took place on 13 December 2021, it was announced that Russia would perform seventh on 19 December 2021, following Bulgaria and preceding Ireland.

At the end of the contest, Russia received 124 points, placing 7th out of 19 participating countries.

=== Voting ===
The same voting system that was introduced in the 2017 edition was used, where the results were determined by 50% online voting and 50% jury voting. Every participating broadcaster assembled a national jury that consisted of three music industry professionals and two children aged between 10 and 15 who were citizens of the country they represented. The rankings of those jurors were combined to make an overall top ten.

The online voting consisted of two phases. The first phase of the online voting began on 17 December 2021 when a recap of all the rehearsal performances was shown on the contest's website Junioreurovision.tv before the viewers could vote. After this, voters also had the option to watch longer one-minute clips from each participant's rehearsal. This first round of voting ended on 17 December at 15:59 CET. The second phase of the online voting took place during the live show and began right after the last performance and was open for 15 minutes. International viewers were able to vote for three songs. They were also able to vote for their own country's song. These votes were then turned into points which were determined by the percentage of votes received. For example, if a song received 10% of the votes, it received 10% of the available points.

Points awarded to Russia
| Score | Country |
|---|---|
| 12 points | Azerbaijan; Kazakhstan; North Macedonia |
| 10 points | |
| 8 points | |
| 7 points | Albania; Armenia |
| 6 points | |
| 5 points | Germany |
| 4 points | Poland; Serbia |
| 3 points | Bulgaria; Netherlands; Spain |
| 2 points | |
| 1 point | France; Malta |
Russia received 50 points from the online vote

Points awarded by Russia
| Score | Country |
|---|---|
| 12 points | Kazakhstan |
| 10 points | Azerbaijan |
| 8 points | North Macedonia |
| 7 points | Albania |
| 6 points | Armenia |
| 5 points | Bulgaria |
| 4 points | France |
| 3 points | Georgia |
| 2 points | Malta |
| 1 point | Poland |

==== Detailed voting results ====
The following members comprised the Russian jury:

- Aleksandr Panayotov
- Manizha – represented Russia in the Eurovision Song Contest 2021
- Philipp Kirkorov – represented Russia in the Eurovision Song Contest 1995
- Ray!
- Valera Kuzakov

Detailed voting results from Russia
| Draw | Country | Juror A | Juror B | Juror C | Juror D | Juror E | Rank | Points |
|---|---|---|---|---|---|---|---|---|
| 01 | Germany | 16 | 13 | 9 | 18 | 18 | 17 | |
| 02 | Georgia | 8 | 9 | 6 | 6 | 12 | 8 | 3 |
| 03 | Poland | 10 | 11 | 12 | 11 | 13 | 10 | 1 |
| 04 | Malta | 15 | 10 | 11 | 7 | 11 | 9 | 2 |
| 05 | Italy | 14 | 14 | 10 | 17 | 10 | 13 | |
| 06 | Bulgaria | 5 | 4 | 7 | 5 | 9 | 6 | 5 |
| 07 | Russia | | | | | | | |
| 08 | Ireland | 17 | 15 | 18 | 16 | 7 | 14 | |
| 09 | Armenia | 7 | 6 | 2 | 8 | 2 | 5 | 6 |
| 10 | Kazakhstan | 1 | 1 | 1 | 2 | 3 | 1 | 12 |
| 11 | Albania | 4 | 5 | 3 | 3 | 5 | 4 | 7 |
| 12 | Ukraine | 18 | 8 | 16 | 9 | 16 | 12 | |
| 13 | France | 6 | 7 | 8 | 10 | 6 | 7 | 4 |
| 14 | Azerbaijan | 2 | 2 | 4 | 1 | 1 | 2 | 10 |
| 15 | Netherlands | 11 | 18 | 13 | 12 | 14 | 15 | |
| 16 | Spain | 13 | 12 | 14 | 14 | 8 | 11 | |
| 17 | Serbia | 12 | 17 | 17 | 13 | 15 | 18 | |
| 18 | North Macedonia | 3 | 3 | 5 | 4 | 4 | 3 | 8 |
| 19 | Portugal | 9 | 16 | 15 | 15 | 17 | 16 | |
