= Bulgaria in the Junior Eurovision Song Contest 2021 =

- Junior Eurovision Song Contest 2021
- Country: Bulgaria
- Selection process: Internal selection
- Announcement date: Artist: 8 November 2021; Song: 13 November 2021

Competing entry
- Song: "Voice of Love"
- Artist: Denislava and Martin
- Songwriters: Vasil Garvanliev; Davor Yordanovski; Vesna Malinova; Stan Stefanov

Placement
- Final result: 16th, 77 points

Participation chronology

Bulgaria was represented at the Junior Eurovision Song Contest 2021 in Paris, France after an absence of four years. Their entrant was selected internally by the Bulgarian broadcaster Bulgarian National Television (BNT). Denislava and Martin represented Bulgaria in the contest and will perform the song "Voice of Love".

== Background ==
Prior to the 2021 contest, Bulgaria had participated in the contest six times. In 2007, the country made its debut with the group Bon-Bon and the song "Bonbolandiya" and finished 7th out of 17 entries with 86 points. One year later, when the competition was held in Cyprus, Bulgaria achieved their worst result to date. The nation ended up in last place (15th) with only 15 points. This was followed by the country's first withdrawal from the competition, which lasted 2 years. Therefore, Bulgaria returned in 2011 with Ivan Ivanov and the song "Superhero" which was ranked in the top ten, finishing in 8th place with 60 points out of 13 countries. Bulgaria was forced to withdraw once again for another 2 years. The country returned to the contest in 2014. Krisia, Hasan & Ibrahim were chosen as the Bulgarian entry with the song "Planet of the Children". The song achieved the best placement in the country in the history of the competition, achieving second place with 147 points; 12 points behind the winner Italy. After Italian broadcaster RAI declined to host the 2015 edition, Bulgaria received the right to host the contest in Sofia, and they last took part in 2016 before returning in 2021.

== Before Junior Eurovision ==
On 8 November 2021, BNT held a special press conference where it was announced that Denislava Dimitrova and Martin Stoyanov, both from Dobrich, Bulgaria, would represent Bulgaria at the contest with the song "Voice of Love". The song was presented on 13 November during the show The day begins with Georgi Lyubenov on BNT 1. It was written by Vasil Garvanliev, Davor Yordanovski, Vesna Malinova, and Stan Stefanov.

== At Junior Eurovision ==
After the opening ceremony, which took place on 13 December 2021, it was announced that Bulgaria would perform sixth on 19 December 2021, following Italy and preceding Russia.

At the end of the contest, Bulgaria received 77 points, placing 16th out of 19 participating countries.

=== Voting ===
The same voting system that was introduced in the 2017 edition was used, where the results were determined by 50% online voting and 50% jury voting. Every participating broadcaster assembled a national jury that consisted of three music industry professionals and two children aged between 10 and 15 who were citizens of the country they represented. The rankings of those jurors were combined to make an overall top ten.

The online voting consisted of two phases. The first phase of the online voting began on 17 December 2021 when a recap of all the rehearsal performances was shown on the contest's website Junioreurovision.tv before the viewers could vote. After this, voters also had the option to watch longer one-minute clips from each participant's rehearsal. This first round of voting ended on 17 December at 15:59 CET. The second phase of the online voting took place during the live show and began right after the last performance and was open for 15 minutes. International viewers were able vote for three songs. They were also able to vote for their own country's song. These votes were then turned into points which were determined by the percentage of votes received. For example, if a song received 10% of the votes, it received 10% of the available points.

Points awarded to Bulgaria
Score	Country
12 points	
10 points	Italy
8 points	
7 points	
6 points	Portugal
5 points	Azerbaijan; Russia
4 points	
3 points	Albania; Georgia; Malta; Ireland
2 points	
1 point	North Macedonia
Bulgaria received 38 points from the online vote

Points awarded by Bulgaria
Score	Country
12 points	Ukraine
10 points	France
8 points	Italy
7 points	Azerbaijan
6 points	Poland
5 points	Georgia
4 points	Portugal
3 points	Russia
2 points	Armenia
1 point	Kazakhstan

==== Detailed voting results ====
Detailed voting results from Bulgaria
Draw	Country	Juror A	Juror B	Juror C	Juror D	Juror E	Rank	Points
01	Germany	13	17	13	18	16	18	
02	Georgia	7	2	7	7	7	6	5
03	Poland	12	10	1	9	2	5	6
04	Malta	6	14	17	15	11	12	
05	Italy	5	4	6	3	3	3	8
06	Bulgaria							
07	Russia	4	9	2	11	15	8	3
08	Ireland	8	18	18	13	12	13	
09	Armenia	15	8	5	5	13	9	2
10	Kazakhstan	14	6	15	6	6	10	1
11	Albania	16	13	11	12	18	17	
12	Ukraine	1	3	3	1	4	1	12
13	France	2	1	8	2	5	2	10
14	Azerbaijan	10	5	4	8	1	4	7
15	Netherlands	11	15	12	16	14	16	
16	Spain	17	12	9	14	17	14	
17	Serbia	9	11	16	10	9	11	
18	North Macedonia	18	16	10	17	10	15	
19	Portugal	3	7	14	4	8	7	4
