= North Macedonia in the Junior Eurovision Song Contest 2021 =

- Junior Eurovision Song Contest 2021
- Country: North Macedonia
- Selection process: Internal selection
- Announcement date: Artist: 12 October 2021; Song: 12 November 2021

Competing entry
- Song: "Green Forces"
- Artist: Dajte Muzika
- Songwriters: Robert Bilbilov; Robin Zimbakov

Placement
- Final result: 9th, 114 points

Participation chronology

North Macedonia was represented at the Junior Eurovision Song Contest 2021 in Paris, France. The national broadcaster, Macedonian Radio Television (MRT), is responsible for the country's participation in the contest. MRT selected four singers from the television show Dajte muzika to represent North Macedonia with the song "Green Forces".

The country returned to the contest after an absence of one year due to the COVID-19 pandemic.

== Background ==
Prior to the 2021 contest, North Macedonia had participated in the Junior Eurovision Song Contest fifteen times, under the provisional reference of "Former Yugoslav Republic of Macedonia", since its debut at the inaugural contest in 2003. North Macedonia were absent twice from the Junior Eurovision Song Contest in 2012 and 2014. They have never won the contest, with their best results being at the 2007 and 2008, represented by the duo Rosica Kulakova and Dimitar Stojmenovski, and Bobi Andonov respectively, achieving fifth place. North Macedonia continued to participate in the contest, but the country withdrew in 2020 due to the COVID-19 pandemic.

== Before Junior Eurovision ==
On 12 October 2021, MRT announced that a group of children from the television series Dajte muzika (Дајте музика) will represent the country in the Junior Eurovision Song Contest 2021. The selected song "Green Forces" was composed by Robert Bilbilov and Robin Zimbakov, and was released on November 12.

== Artist and song information ==
=== Dajte Muzika ===
Dajte Muzika Даjте Музика
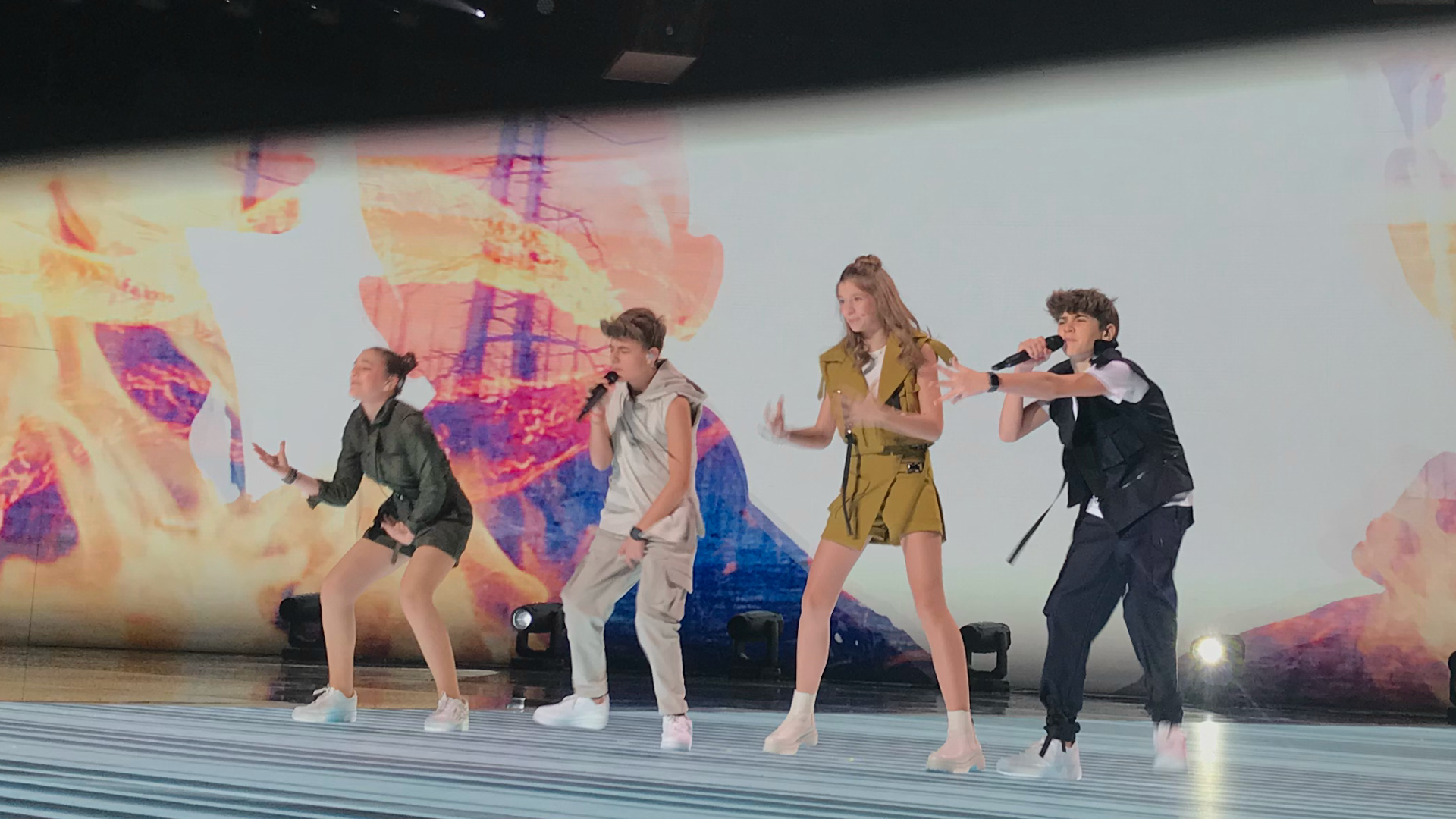

Background information
- Origin: Skopje, North Macedonia
- Genres: Pop
- Years active: 2019–present
- Members: Kristina Mukaetova; Anastasija Džabirska; Miha Gigov; Filip Popovski

Dajte Muzika is a group from the Macedonian TV program of the same name that represented North Macedonia at the Junior Eurovision Song Contest 2021 in Paris, France.

=== Green Forces ===
(North Macedonia) "Green Forces"
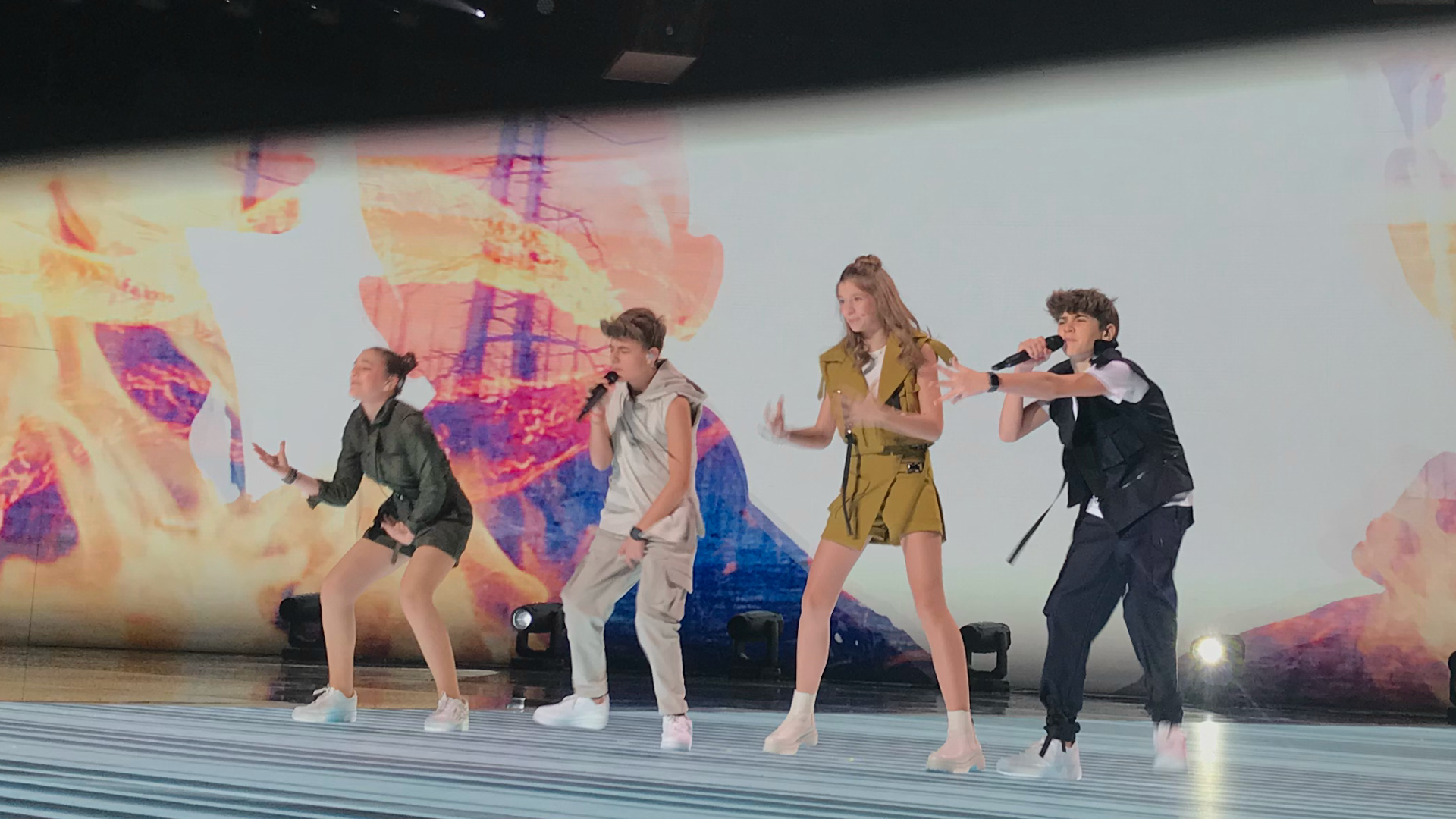

Eurovision Song Contest 2021 entry
- Country: North Macedonia
- Artist: Dajte Muzika
- Lyricists: Robert Bilbilov; Robin Zimbakov

Entry chronology
- ◄ "Fire" (2019)

"Green Forces" is a song by Dajte Muzika, written by Robert Bilbilov and Robin Zimbakov. It represented North Macedonia at the Junior Eurovision Song Contest 2021 in Paris, France. The song was released on 12 November, 2021.

== At Junior Eurovision ==
After the opening ceremony, which took place on 13 December 2021, it was announced that North Macedonia would perform eighteenth on 19 December 2021, following Serbia and preceding Portugal.

At the end of the contest, North Macedonia received 114 points, placing 9th out of 19 participating countries.

=== Voting ===
The same voting system that was introduced in the 2017 edition was used, where the results were determined by 50% online voting and 50% jury voting. Every participating broadcaster assembled a national jury that consisted of three music industry professionals and two children aged between 10 and 15 who were citizens of the country they represented. The rankings of those jurors were combined to make an overall top ten.

The online voting consisted of two phases. The first phase of the online voting began on 17 December 2021 when a recap of all the rehearsal performances was shown on the contest's website Junioreurovision.tv before the viewers could vote. After this, voters also had the option to watch longer one-minute clips from each participant's rehearsal. This first round of voting ended on 17 December at 15:59 CET. The second phase of the online voting took place during the live show and began right after the last performance and was open for 15 minutes. International viewers were able to vote for three songs. They were also able to vote for their own country's song. These votes were then turned into points which were determined by the percentage of votes received. For example, if a song received 10% of the votes, it received 10% of the available points.

Points awarded to North Macedonia
Score	Country
12 points	Albania
10 points	Azerbaijan
8 points	Russia
7 points	
6 points	
5 points	Armenia; France; Ireland; Ukraine
4 points	
3 points	Serbia
2 points	Georgia
1 point	
North Macedonia received 59 points from the online vote

Points awarded by North Macedonia
Score	Country
12 points	Russia
10 points	Albania
8 points	Georgia
7 points	Serbia
6 points	France
5 points	Poland
4 points	Malta
3 points	Azerbaijan
2 points	Armenia
1 point	Bulgaria

==== Detailed voting results ====
Detailed voting results from North Macedonia
Draw	Country	Juror A	Juror B	Juror C	Juror D	Juror E	Rank	Points
01	Germany	16	5	7	13	15	11	
02	Georgia	9	3	1	8	8	3	8
03	Poland	6	2	6	9	9	6	5
04	Malta	11	1	13	10	5	7	4
05	Italy	7	17	14	14	10	14	
06	Bulgaria	18	13	3	6	17	10	1
07	Russia	2	4	2	2	4	1	12
08	Ireland	13	14	16	17	16	18	
09	Armenia	10	15	9	1	7	9	2
10	Kazakhstan	8	6	17	16	11	12	
11	Albania	1	10	4	3	1	2	10
12	Ukraine	15	18	11	11	13	16	
13	France	4	7	5	7	6	5	6
14	Azerbaijan	5	12	15	5	3	8	3
15	Netherlands	14	11	12	15	12	15	
16	Spain	12	8	10	12	14	13	
17	Serbia	3	16	8	4	2	4	7
18	North Macedonia							
19	Portugal	17	9	18	18	18	17	
