= Malta in the Junior Eurovision Song Contest 2021 =

- Junior Eurovision Song Contest 2021
- Country: Malta
- Selection process: Malta Junior Eurovision Song Contest 2021
- Selection date: 16 October 2021

Competing entry
- Song: "My Home"
- Artist: Ike and Kaya
- Songwriters: Owen Leuellen; Muxu; Cyprian Cassar

Placement
- Final result: 12th, 97 points

Participation chronology

Malta was represented at the Junior Eurovision Song Contest 2021, held in Paris, France. The Maltese broadcaster Public Broadcasting Services (PBS) was responsible for the country's participation in the contest, and organized a national final to select the Maltese entry.

== Background ==
Prior to the 2021 contest, Malta had participated in the Junior Eurovision Song Contest sixteen times since their first participation in the inaugural 2003 contest. Malta had participated in every contest with the exception of the 2011 and 2012 contests. Malta has won the contest twice: in 2013 with "The Start" performed by Gaia Cauchi, and in 2015 with "Not My Soul" performed by Destiny Chukunyere. In the 2020 contest, Malta was represented by the song "Chasing Sunsets" performed by Chanel Monseigneur. The song placed 8th out of 12 entries with 100 points.

== Before Junior Eurovision ==
=== Malta Junior Eurovision Song Contest 2021 ===
Malta's participation in the contest was confirmed by PBS in August 2021. PBS organised the national final Malta Junior Eurovision Song Contest 2021 to select the Maltese entry.

==== Competing entries ====
Artists and songwriters were able to submit their entries between 26 July and 5 September 2021, with the plan originally being to select 12 competing participants, to be announced on 19 September 2021. However, due to the unprecedented high number of submissions, 20 shortlisted songs were revealed on 19 September, which were cut down to twelve in the following week.

Artist	Song	Songwriter(s)
Amelia Kalabic	"Dear World"	Christina Magrin
Eksenia Sammut	"Building"	Bettina MuchMore, Philipa Naudi
Ella Raina	"Limitless"	Muxu, Cyprian Cassar
Emma Briffa	"My Angel's Calling"	Muxu, Cyprian Cassar
Ike and Kaya	"My Home"	Owen Leuellen, Muxu, Cyprian Cassar
Kylie Micallef	"Keep Your Drama"	Christina Magrin
Maria Curmi	"Wild and Free"	Emil Calleja Bayliss, Cyprian Cassar
Marija Djinovic	"Magic"	Emil Calleja Bayliss, Aldo Spiteri, Bradley Spiteri
Mycha, Kylie & Denzel Jo	"Running Free"	Emil Calleja Bayliss, Denzel Jo Armani, Joseph Armani, Toby Farrugia
Rih & Bri	"Drops Like Fire"	Muxu, Cyprian Cassar
Yulan Law	"Change"	Etienne Micallef, Dominic Cini, Jonas Gladnikoff
Yulan Law	"On My Way"	Amber Bondin, Elton Zarb

==== Final ====
The final took place on 16 October 2021 at the Robert Samut Hall in Floriana, hosted by Elaine Saliba Bonnici. The winner was selected by the votes of a jury panel (50%) and public televoting (50%). The jury consisted of Maltese Junior Eurovision Song Contest 2015 winner and Eurovision Song Contest 2021 entrant Destiny Chukunyere, singer Maxine Pace and musician Sigmund Mifsud. The interval act featured Destiny performing "Je me casse".

"My Home" performed by Ike and Kaya was announced as the winner of the national final. The song was composed by Cyprian Cassar and lyricised by Owen Leuellen and MUXU. The duo previously participated in the competition Malta's Got Talent in 2020, where they were praised for their energy and musicality. They achieved 4th place in the competition. Kaya had also participated in Malta Junior Eurovision Song Contest as a solo act in 2020, with the song "Made of Stars".

Final – 16 October 2021
Draw	Artist	Song	Place
1	Emma Briffa	"My Angel's Calling"	—
2	Kylie Micallef	"Keep Your Drama"	—
3	Maria Curmi	"Wild and Free"	—
4	Yulan Law	"Change"	—
5	Eksenia Sammut	"Building"	—
6	Amelia Kalabic	"Dear World"	—
7	Rih & Bri	"Drops Like Fire"	—
8	Ella Raina	"Limitless"	—
9	Ike and Kaya	"My Home"	1
10	Yulan Law	"On My Way"	3
11	Marija Djinovic	"Magic"	—
12	Mycha, Kylie & Denzel Jo	"Running Free"	2

== At Junior Eurovision ==
After the opening ceremony, which took place on 13 December 2021, it was announced that Malta would perform fourth on 19 December 2021, following Poland and preceding Italy.

At the end of the contest, Malta received 97 points, placing 12th out of 19 participating countries.

=== Voting ===
The same voting system that was introduced in the 2017 edition was used, where the results were determined by 50% online voting and 50% jury voting. Every participating broadcaster assembled a national jury that consisted of three music industry professionals and two children aged between 10 and 15 who were citizens of the country they represented. The rankings of those jurors were combined to make an overall top ten.

The online voting consisted of two phases. The first phase of the online voting began on 17 December 2021 when a recap of all the rehearsal performances was shown on the contest's website Junioreurovision.tv before the viewers could vote. After this, voters also had the option to watch longer one-minute clips from each participant's rehearsal. This first round of voting ended on 17 December at 15:59 CET. The second phase of the online voting took place during the live show and began right after the last performance and was open for 15 minutes. International viewers were able vote for three songs. They were also able to vote for their own country's song. These votes were then turned into points which were determined by the percentage of votes received. For example, if a song received 10% of the votes, it received 10% of the available points.

Points awarded to Malta
Score	Country
12 points	
10 points	
8 points	Georgia; Ukraine
7 points	
6 points	Germany
5 points	
4 points	Azerbaijan; North Macedonia; Portugal
3 points	Armenia; Kazakhstan
2 points	Italy; Poland; Russia
1 point	Spain
Malta received 50 points from the online vote

Points awarded by Malta
Score	Country
12 points	Georgia
10 points	Poland
8 points	France
7 points	Kazakhstan
6 points	Italy
5 points	Armenia
4 points	Portugal
3 points	Bulgaria
2 points	Azerbaijan
1 point	Russia

==== Detailed voting results ====
Detailed voting results from Malta
Draw	Country	Juror A	Juror B	Juror C	Juror D	Juror E	Rank	Points
01	Germany	18	16	17	9	18	18	
02	Georgia	1	2	2	1	1	1	12
03	Poland	4	8	4	2	2	2	10
04	Malta							
05	Italy	6	4	3	6	8	5	6
06	Bulgaria	7	13	10	5	6	8	3
07	Russia	11	15	5	10	9	10	1
08	Ireland	15	12	16	11	16	16	
09	Armenia	3	14	6	7	3	6	5
10	Kazakhstan	5	3	7	4	5	4	7
11	Albania	14	11	12	14	13	15	
12	Ukraine	13	10	8	12	11	12	
13	France	12	1	1	16	4	3	8
14	Azerbaijan	8	7	9	13	7	9	2
15	Netherlands	10	17	15	17	15	17	
16	Spain	17	9	13	8	10	13	
17	Serbia	16	5	14	18	14	14	
18	North Macedonia	9	6	11	15	12	11	
19	Portugal	2	18	18	3	17	7	4
