= Germany in the Junior Eurovision Song Contest 2021 =

- Junior Eurovision Song Contest 2021
- Country: Germany
- Selection process: Junior ESC – Wer fährt nach Paris?
- Selection date: 10 September 2021

Competing entry
- Song: "Imagine Us"
- Artist: Pauline

Placement
- Final result: 17th, 61 points

Participation chronology

Germany was represented at the Junior Eurovision Song Contest 2021 in Paris, France. Pauline represented the country with the song "Imagine Us", having won the national final Junior ESC – Wer fährt nach Paris? on 10 September, organised by the television station Kika.

== Background ==
Germany debuted in the Junior Eurovision Song Contest in 2020. Children's station Kika, a joint venture of the German national broadcasters ARD and ZDF, broadcasts the event within Germany and organises the selection of the nation's entry. NDR had set up a national final for the 2020 contest with several artists to choose the first German entry, "Stronger with You" performed by Susan Oseloff, which placed last out of twelve competing songs, scoring 66 points.

== Before Junior Eurovision ==
=== Junior ESC – Wer fährt nach Paris? ===
Junior ESC – Wer fährt nach Paris? (English: Junior ESC – Who goes to Paris?) was the competition that selected Germany's entry for the Junior Eurovision Song Contest 2021. On 1 June 2021, Kika opened the application window where children aged between 9 and 14 were able to apply for the competition until 25 June 2021 and over 100 applications were received. Five candidates were selected by an expert panel to go through to the online vote and were announced on 23 July 2021.

==== Online vote ====
On 23 July 2021, performance clips of each of the five candidates performing a cover song of their choice were released online via Kika's official website and users had until 31 July to vote for their favourite candidate. On 3 August 2021, Kika announced the top three candidates selected to proceed to the national final.

Online vote – 23–31 July 2021
Draw	Artist	Song (original artists)	Result
1	Marta	"Stop This Flame" (Celeste)	Finalist
2	Anjali	"Valerie" (The Zutons)	Eliminated
3	Yike	"Listen" (Beyoncé)	Eliminated
4	Pauline	"Love Shine a Light" (Katrina and the Waves)	Finalist
5	Emelie	"Make You Feel My Love" (Bob Dylan)	Finalist

==== Final ====
The televised final took place on 10 September 2021 at 19:30 CEST in the Central Club in Erfurt, Germany, hosted by Jessica Schöne and Ben Blümel. Each of the three finalists performed two candidate Junior Eurovision songs selected by them from three already produced songs, provided by composers signed to record companies, entitled "Gut so" (English: Good this way), "Hausboot" (English: Houseboat), and "Imagine Us". After the first round, one finalist was chosen by public voting and advanced to the second round. The winning song was then selected in the second round from the two songs. The jury panel included Hannah from the broadcaster Kika, and two music experts consisting of artists Selina Mour and Gabriel Kelly. They provided feedback in regards to the songs during the show, but had no voting power.

Artist selection – 10 September 2021
Draw	Artist	Song	Result
1	Emelie	"Imagine Us"	Eliminated
2	Marta	"Imagine Us"	Eliminated
3	Pauline	"Imagine Us"	Selected
4	Marta	"Gut so"	Eliminated
5	Pauline	"Hausboot"	Selected
6	Emelie	"Gut so"	Eliminated

Song selection – 10 September 2021
Draw	Song	Place
1	"Imagine Us"	1
2	"Hausboot"	2

== At Junior Eurovision ==
During the opening ceremony and the running order draw, which both took place on 13 December 2021, Germany was drawn to perform first on 19 December 2021, preceding Georgia.

At the end of the contest, Germany received 61 points, placing 17th out of 19 participating countries.

=== Performance ===
Pauline performed the song "Imagine Us" along with two dancers, Angelina and Marah, with a crowd of cartoon characters shown on the LED screen behind the performers. The song, written by Alexander Henke, Torben Brüggemann, Ricardo Muñoz and Patrick Salmy, was in German and English. During the performance, rainbows, hearts and peace signs are shown. Those symbols are also shown on protest signs held by the cartoon characters and the two dancers.

=== Voting ===
The same voting system that was introduced in the 2017 edition was used, where the results were determined by 50% online voting and 50% jury voting. Every participating broadcaster assembled a national jury that consisted of three music industry professionals and two children aged between 10 and 15 who were citizens of the country they represented. The rankings of those jurors were combined to make an overall top ten.

The online voting consisted of two phases. The first phase of the online voting began on 17 December 2021 when a recap of all the rehearsal performances was shown on the contest's website Junioreurovision.tv before the viewers could vote. After this, voters also had the option to watch longer one-minute clips from each participant's rehearsal. This first round of voting ended on 17 December at 15:59 CET. The second phase of the online voting took place during the live show and began right after the last performance and was open for 15 minutes. International viewers were able vote for three songs. They were also able to vote for their own country's song. These votes were then turned into points which were determined by the percentage of votes received. For example, if a song received 10% of the votes, it received 10% of the available points.

Points awarded to Germany
Score	Country
12 points	
10 points	
8 points	
7 points	
6 points	
5 points	Serbia
4 points	Ireland; Kazakhstan
3 points	
2 points	Portugal
1 point	
Germany received 46 points from the online vote

Points awarded by Germany
Score	Country
12 points	Poland
10 points	Armenia
8 points	France
7 points	Ukraine
6 points	Malta
5 points	Russia
4 points	Albania
3 points	Kazakhstan
2 points	Azerbaijan
1 point	Spain

==== Detailed voting results ====
The following members comprised the German jury:

- Leene Stuhr
- Carl Johannes Höft
- Denise Modjallal
- Sabrina Weckerlin
- Mo

Detailed voting results from Germany
Draw	Country	Juror A	Juror B	Juror C	Juror D	Juror E	Rank	Points
01	Germany							
02	Georgia	11	11	16	12	5	13	
03	Poland	4	6	4	2	3	1	12
04	Malta	5	4	5	10	6	5	6
05	Italy	15	2	9	14	12	11	
06	Bulgaria	6	15	13	15	13	16	
07	Russia	9	14	7	6	1	6	5
08	Ireland	8	12	17	16	7	14	
09	Armenia	12	8	3	1	2	2	10
10	Kazakhstan	13	17	2	3	16	8	3
11	Albania	1	13	10	5	11	7	4
12	Ukraine	18	3	6	4	4	4	7
13	France	2	1	11	7	10	3	8
14	Azerbaijan	17	9	1	13	8	9	2
15	Netherlands	14	5	14	17	17	15	
16	Spain	3	7	12	11	14	10	1
17	Serbia	10	18	15	9	9	17	
18	North Macedonia	7	10	8	8	15	12	
19	Portugal	16	16	18	18	18	18	
