= Azerbaijan in the Junior Eurovision Song Contest 2021 =

- Junior Eurovision Song Contest 2021
- Country: Azerbaijan
- Selection process: Internal selection
- Announcement date: Artist: 16 August 2021; Song: 17 November 2021

Competing entry
- Song: "One of Those Days"
- Artist: Sona Azizova
- Songwriters: Maria Broberg; Francisco Faria; Martin Wiik; Hampus Eurenius; Javid Shahbazbayov; Sona Azizova

Placement
- Final result: 5th, 151 points

Participation chronology

Azerbaijan was represented at the Junior Eurovision Song Contest 2021 in Paris, France on 19 December. Azerbaijani public television channel İctimai Television (İTV) internally selected Sona Azizova to represent the country with the song "One of Those Days".

== Background ==
Azerbaijan debuted in the Junior Eurovision Song Contest in 2012, and also participated in the 2013 and 2018 contests. In 2018, Fidan Huseynova represented the country with the song "I Wanna Be Like You", and placed 16th with 47 points, out of 20 countries. The country did not return to the contest after 2018, until 2021.

== Before Junior Eurovision ==
İTV announced their return to the contest on 16 August 2021, along with the selected artist. The broadcaster started a song selection process in which composers could submit songs until September 10, after which the entry will be selected internally by a jury of Azerbaijani and international experts. Azizova said she hoped for a rock-style song.

Head of delegation Isa Melikov has said about the country's participation: "We are quite ambitious. After 3 years of absence, we need a hit song to be remembered. Regardless of the genre, we will do our best." Their selected artist was Sona Azizova (born 25 March 2009) with the song "One of Those Days". Azizova had previously participated in the first season of The Voice Kids Azerbaijan and placed second. She also performed at the Winter International Kids Music Festival.

== At Junior Eurovision ==
After the opening ceremony, which took place on 13 December 2021, it was announced that Azerbaijan would perform fourteenth on 19 December 2021, following France and preceding Netherlands.

At the end of the contest, Azerbaijan received 151 points, placing 5th out of 19 participating countries, giving Azerbaijan its best result in the contest as of 2025.

=== Voting ===
The same voting system that was introduced in the 2017 edition was used, where the results were determined by 50% online voting and 50% jury voting. Every participating broadcaster assembled a national jury that consisted of three music industry professionals and two children aged between 10 and 15 who were citizens of the country they represented. The rankings of those jurors were combined to make an overall top ten.

The online voting consisted of two phases. The first phase of the online voting began on 17 December 2021 when a recap of all the rehearsal performances was shown on the contest's website Junioreurovision.tv before the viewers could vote. After this, voters also had the option to watch longer one-minute clips from each participant's rehearsal. This first round of voting ended on 17 December at 15:59 CET. The second phase of the online voting took place during the live show and began right after the last performance and was open for 15 minutes. International viewers were able to vote for three songs. They were also able to vote for their own country's song. These votes were then turned into points which were determined by the percentage of votes received. For example, if a song received 10% of the votes, it received 10% of the available points.

Points awarded to Azerbaijan
Score	Country
12 points	Italy; Ukraine
10 points	Georgia; Kazakhstan; Poland; Portugal; Russia
8 points	Netherlands
7 points	Bulgaria
6 points	Serbia
5 points	Spain
4 points	
3 points	North Macedonia
2 points	Germany; Malta
1 point	Albania; Ireland
Azerbaijan received 42 points from the online vote

Points awarded by Azerbaijan
Score	Country
12 points	Russia
10 points	North Macedonia
8 points	Kazakhstan
7 points	Georgia
6 points	Ukraine
5 points	Bulgaria
4 points	Malta
3 points	Poland
2 points	Spain
1 point	Italy

==== Detailed voting results ====
Detailed voting results from Azerbaijan
Draw	Country	Juror A	Juror B	Juror C	Juror D	Juror E	Rank	Points
01	Germany	12	16	15	12	12	15	
02	Georgia	3	4	5	8	4	4	7
03	Poland	13	6	10	3	7	8	3
04	Malta	5	8	8	5	8	7	4
05	Italy	10	10	9	10	14	10	1
06	Bulgaria	6	7	7	6	6	6	5
07	Russia	1	1	2	1	2	1	12
08	Ireland	15	14	16	16	9	16	
09	Armenia	18	18	17	17	17	18	
10	Kazakhstan	2	2	4	4	3	3	8
11	Albania	9	13	13	13	18	14	
12	Ukraine	7	5	6	7	5	5	6
13	France	16	17	12	9	10	13	
14	Azerbaijan							
15	Netherlands	8	12	11	14	11	11	
16	Spain	17	15	3	18	15	9	2
17	Serbia	14	9	18	15	16	17	
18	North Macedonia	4	3	1	2	1	2	10
19	Portugal	11	11	14	11	13	12	
