= Armenia in the Junior Eurovision Song Contest 2021 =

- Junior Eurovision Song Contest 2021
- Participating broadcaster: Public Television Company of Armenia (AMPTV)
- Country: Armenia
- Selection process: Internal selection
- Announcement date: Artist: 17 November 2021; Song: 19 November 2021

Competing entry
- Song: "Qami Qami"
- Artist: Maléna
- Songwriters: Vahram Petrosyan; Tokionine; Arpine Martoyan; David Tserunyan

Placement
- Final result: 1st, 224 points

Participation chronology

Armenia was represented at the Junior Eurovision Song Contest 2021 with the song "Qami Qami", written by Vahram Petrosyan, Tokionine, Arpine Martoyan, and David Tserunyan, and performed by Martoyan herself under her stage name Maléna. The Armenian participating broadcaster, the Public Television Company of Armenia (AMPTV), internally selected its entry for the contest. Maléna was due to compete in the 2020 contest with the song "Why" before AMPTV withdrew due to the 2020 Nagorno-Karabakh war. The song won the contest with 224 points; 6 points more than the runner-up Poland.

== Background ==
Prior to the 2021 contest, the Public Television Company of Armenia (AMPTV) had participated in the Junior Eurovision Song Contest representing Armenia twelve times since its first entry in 2007, with their best result being in 2010 when they won with the song "Mama", performed by Vladimir Arzumanyan. AMPTV went on to host the Junior Eurovision Song Contest 2011 in Yerevan. In the 2019 contest, Karina Ignatyan represented country in Gliwice, Poland with the song "Colours of Your Dream". The song ended 9th out of 19 entries with 115 points.

Despite being included on the final list of participants, AMPTV withdrew from the 2020 contest in November 2020 due to the then-ongoing Nagorno-Karabakh war. It was later revealed that Maléna Fox had been internally selected to represent Armenia with the song "Why". With the Nagorno-Karabakh war ending on 10 November, Armenia's head of delegation David Tserunyan wrote on Instagram that the country would "come back stronger than ever".

== Before Junior Eurovision ==
On 17 November 2021, AMPTV confirmed that Maléna was internally selected to represent Armenia again in the contest. More than a month prior to the announcement, Armenian media had already reported that she was selected. It was officially revealed on 18 November 2021 that Maléna would perform "Qami Qami" at the contest, and the lyrics of the song were revealed on the junioreurovision.tv website. The song itself was released the next day.

== At Junior Eurovision ==
After the opening ceremony, which took place on 13 December 2021, it was announced that Armenia would perform ninth on 19 December 2021, following Ireland and preceding Kazakhstan.

At the end of the contest, Armenia received a total of 224 points, winning the contest.

=== Voting ===
The same voting system that was introduced in the 2017 edition was used, where the results were determined by 50% online voting and 50% jury voting. Every participating broadcaster assembled a national jury that consisted of three music industry professionals and two children aged between 10 and 15 who were citizens of the country they represented. The rankings of those jurors were combined to make an overall top ten.

The online voting consisted of two phases. The first phase of the online voting began on 17 December 2021 when a recap of all the rehearsal performances was shown on the contest's website Junioreurovision.tv before the viewers could vote. After this, voters also had the option to watch longer one-minute clips from each participant's rehearsal. This first round of voting ended on 17 December at 15:59 CET. The second phase of the online voting took place during the live show and began right after the last performance and was open for 15 minutes. International viewers were able to vote for three songs. They were also able to vote for their own country's song. These votes were then turned into points which were determined by the percentage of votes received. For example, if a song received 10% of the votes, it received 10% of the available points.

Points awarded to Armenia
Score	Country
12 points	Poland; Portugal
10 points	France; Germany; Spain
8 points	Serbia
7 points	Ireland; Netherlands; Ukraine
6 points	Albania; Kazakhstan; Russia
5 points	Georgia; Malta
4 points	
3 points	
2 points	Bulgaria; North Macedonia
1 point	
Armenia received 109 points from the online vote

Points awarded by Armenia
Score	Country
12 points	Georgia
10 points	France
8 points	Albania
7 points	Russia
6 points	Spain
5 points	North Macedonia
4 points	Kazakhstan
3 points	Malta
2 points	Ukraine
1 point	Poland

==== Detailed voting results ====
Detailed voting results from Armenia
Draw	Country	Juror A	Juror B	Juror C	Juror D	Juror E	Rank	Points
01	Germany	15	7	17	10	5	12	
02	Georgia	4	1	3	3	3	1	12
03	Poland	11	12	4	7	12	10	1
04	Malta	10	4	14	13	4	8	3
05	Italy	7	16	15	14	6	15	
06	Bulgaria	8	9	13	15	8	14	
07	Russia	12	6	1	2	9	4	7
08	Ireland	16	11	16	11	14	17	
09	Armenia							
10	Kazakhstan	14	17	7	6	2	7	4
11	Albania	1	5	9	12	1	3	8
12	Ukraine	17	3	6	9	17	9	2
13	France	2	13	2	1	13	2	10
14	Azerbaijan	18	18	18	18	18	18	
15	Netherlands	9	10	8	17	15	16	
16	Spain	3	15	5	5	11	5	6
17	Serbia	5	14	12	16	7	13	
18	North Macedonia	6	2	10	8	16	6	5
19	Portugal	13	8	11	4	10	11	

== After Junior Eurovision ==
Maléna arrived at the Zvartnots International Airport in Yerevan, Armenia, the day after the contest, where she was awaited by a crowd of press and fans.

Two days after Armenia's victory, on 21 December, it was announced that AMPTV would host the 2022 edition in Armenia.
