= Serbia in the Junior Eurovision Song Contest 2021 =

- Junior Eurovision Song Contest 2021
- Country: Serbia
- Selection process: Internal selection
- Announcement date: Artist: 5 October 2021; Song: 28 October 2021

Competing entry
- Song: "Oči deteta (Children's Eyes)"
- Artist: Jovana and Dunja
- Songwriters: Ana Frlin

Placement
- Final result: 13th, 86 points

Participation chronology

Serbia was represented at the Junior Eurovision Song Contest 2021, held in Paris, France.

== Background ==
Prior to the 2021 contest, Serbia had participated in the Junior Eurovision Song Contest twelve times since its debut in 2006, and once as Serbia and Montenegro in 2005, prior to the Montenegrin independence referendum in 2006 which culminated into the dissolution of Serbia and Montenegro, As of 2020, Serbia's best results are two third places, achieved in 2007 and 2010. In the 2020 contest, Serbia placed 11th with Petar Aničić and the song "Heartbeat".

== Before Junior Eurovision ==
On 5 October 2021, RTS announced that Jovana Radonjić and Dunja Živković would represent Serbia in the contest with the song "Oči deteta (Children's Eyes)". The duo was chosen following a three-stage internal selection process, with the final stage consisting of three shortlisted acts performing their songs in front of a jury consisting of RTS music editors at the Studio 6 of Radio Belgrade, after which the jury distributed 1–3 points to their favourite acts. The other longlisted songs were: "Osmeh" performed by Tara Šujeranović, "Dete od snova" performed by Tomislav Božović and "U dobru i u zlu" performed by Veljko Kovačević. The song was presented on 28 October 2021.

== At Junior Eurovision ==
After the opening ceremony, which took place on 13 December 2021, it was announced that Serbia would perform seventeenth on 19 December 2021, following Spain and preceding North Macedonia.

At the end of the contest, Serbia received 86 points, placing 13th out of 19 participating countries.

=== Voting ===
The same voting system that was introduced in the 2017 edition was used, where the results were determined by 50% online voting and 50% jury voting. Every participating broadcaster assembled a national jury that consisted of three music industry professionals and two children aged between 10 and 15 who were citizens of the country they represented. The rankings of those jurors were combined to make an overall top ten.

The online voting consisted of two phases. The first phase of the online voting began on 17 December 2021 when a recap of all the rehearsal performances was shown on the contest's website Junioreurovision.tv before the viewers could vote. After this, voters also had the option to watch longer one-minute clips from each participant's rehearsal. This first round of voting ended on 17 December at 15:59 CET. The second phase of the online voting took place during the live show and began right after the last performance and was open for 15 minutes. International viewers were able to vote for three songs. They were also able to vote for their own country's song. These votes were then turned into points which were determined by the percentage of votes received. For example, if a song received 10% of the votes, it received 10% of the available points.

Points awarded to Serbia
Score	Country
12 points	
10 points	
8 points	
7 points	Georgia; North Macedonia
6 points	Italy
5 points	
4 points	
3 points	
2 points	Ireland; Ukraine
1 point	
Serbia received 62 points from the online vote

Points awarded by Serbia
Score	Country
12 points	France
10 points	Georgia
8 points	Armenia
7 points	Poland
6 points	Azerbaijan
5 points	Germany
4 points	Russia
3 points	North Macedonia
2 points	Kazakhstan
1 point	Netherlands

==== Detailed voting results ====
Detailed voting results from Serbia
Draw	Country	Juror A	Juror B	Juror C	Juror D	Juror E	Rank	Points
01	Germany	3	9	7	7	14	6	5
02	Georgia	1	2	6	2	3	2	10
03	Poland	16	4	4	4	4	4	7
04	Malta	15	16	15	16	11	17	
05	Italy	7	7	13	13	9	11	
06	Bulgaria	10	10	18	6	16	12	
07	Russia	9	8	5	8	8	7	4
08	Ireland	13	11	16	14	17	16	
09	Armenia	5	3	1	3	2	3	8
10	Kazakhstan	12	5	8	9	7	9	2
11	Albania	8	12	17	15	15	14	
12	Ukraine	11	17	11	17	12	15	
13	France	6	1	2	1	1	1	12
14	Azerbaijan	2	6	10	5	6	5	6
15	Netherlands	4	13	9	10	13	10	1
16	Spain	14	14	12	12	10	13	
17	Serbia							
18	North Macedonia	18	15	3	11	5	8	3
19	Portugal	17	18	14	18	18	18	
