= Ireland in the Junior Eurovision Song Contest 2021 =

- Junior Eurovision Song Contest 2021
- Country: Ireland
- Selection process: Artist: Junior Eurovision Éire; Song: Internal selection
- Selection date: Heats; 12 September 2021; 19 September 2021; 26 September 2021; 3 October 2021; Semi-Final; 10 October 2021; Final; 17 October 2021 Song: 16 November 2021

Competing entry
- Song: "Saor (Disappear)"
- Artist: Maiú Levi Lawlor
- Songwriters: Niall Mooney; Lauren White Murphy; Brendan McCarthy; LA Halvery; Anna Kearney; Anna Banks; Cyprian Cassar

Placement
- Final result: 18th, 44 points

Participation chronology

Ireland was represented at the Junior Eurovision Song Contest 2021, held in Paris, France. Maiú Levi Lawlor was selected by TG4 through a televised national final, with his song, "Saor (Disappear)", being internally selected.

The country returned to the contest after a break of one year from the 2020 contest due to the COVID-19 pandemic.

== Background ==
Prior to the 2021 contest, Ireland had participated in the Junior Eurovision Song Contest five times since its debut in 2015. In 2019, Anna Kearney represented the country with the song "Banshee", finishing 12th out of 19 entries with 73 points. Despite having initially confirmed their participation in the 2020 contest in Warsaw, Poland in January 2020, TG4 announced in August 2020 that they would not participate in the contest due to the COVID-19 pandemic.

== Before Junior Eurovision ==
=== Junior Eurovision Éire ===
Junior Eurovision Éire returned to select the Irish act. Eoghan McDermott, who hosted the selection from 2015 to 2019, did not return to host the selection. He was replaced by Louise Cantillon, a Dublin-based radio presenter.

All songs were performed in Irish.

==== Jury members ====
As in previous editions, the results of each show were decided by an in-studio jury of two permanent members and revolving guest judges. The two permanent judges were:

- Niamh Ní Chróinín – Radio presenter, manager of Irish-language youth radio station Raidió Rí-Rá
- Fiachna Ó Braonáin – Member of Hothouse Flowers (interval act at Eurovision Song Contest 1988), a permanent judge on Junior Eurovision Éire 2016–2018, composer of "Banshee" (Junior Eurovision 2019 Irish entry)

Guest Judges
Artist	ESC Year(s)	Song(s)	Place (SF)	Points (SF)	Place (Final)	Points (Final)
Linda Martin	1984	"Terminal 3"	No semi-finals		2	137
Linda Martin	1992	"Why Me?"	No semi-finals		1	155
Niamh Kavanagh	1993	"In Your Eyes"	No semi-finals		1	187
Niamh Kavanagh	2010	"It's for You"	9	67	23	25
Mickey Joe Harte	2003	"We've Got the World"	No semi-finals		11	53
Brian Kennedy	2006	"Every Song Is a Cry for Love"	9	79	10	93
Jedward	2011	"Lipstick"	8	68	8	119
Jedward	2012	"Waterline"	6	92	19	46
Lesley Roy	2021	"Maps"	16 ◁	20	Failed to qualify	

==== Heat 1 ====
Detailed jury voting results
Draw	Artist	Jury Votes			Total
Draw	Artist	Juror 1	Juror 2	Juror 3	Total
1	Eva Norton	9	10	8	28
2	Ronan Spencer	9	9	9	27
3	Lilyella Buckley	10	10	9	29
4	Orla McDermott	9	9	10	28
5	Katie Hardiman	8	9	9	26
6	Aimee and Grace Gillard	7	8	9	24
7	Saoirse Garrihy	7	8	7	22

The first heat of Junior Eurovision Éire was broadcast on 12 September 2021, with Niamh Kavanagh as the guest judge.

Draw	Artist	Song	Stars	Result
01	Eva Norton	"This Is Me" (Keala Settle)	28	Final duel
02	Ronan Spencer	"Always" (Gavin James)	27	Eliminated
03	Lilyella Buckley	"Someone You Loved" (Lewis Capaldi)	29	Semi-Final
04	Orla McDermott	"Ghost" (Luan Parle)	28	Final duel
05	Katie Hardiman	"Catch and Release" (Matt Simons)	27	Eliminated
06	Aimee and Grace Gillard	"Feel It Again" (Hudson Taylor)	24	Eliminated
07	Saoirse Garrihy	"Shape of You" (Ed Sheeran)	22	Eliminated

Final duel
Draw	Artist	Song	Votes	Result
01	Eva Norton	"This Is Me" (Keala Settle)	2	Semi-Final
02	Orla McDermott	"Ghost" (Luan Parle)	1	Eliminated

Lilyella Buckley received the highest number of stars, and advanced directly to the semi-final. Eva Norton and Orla McDermott both advanced to the final duel stage and performed their covers a second time. After their second performances, the jury members selected Eva as the winner, granting a spot in the semi-final.

==== Heat 2 ====
Detailed jury voting results
Draw	Artist	Jury Votes			Total
Draw	Artist	Juror 1	Juror 2	Juror 3	Total
1	Shannon Copeland	9	8	9	26
2	Cora Harkin	9	8	8	25
3	Sienna Hopkins	8	8	9	25
4	Zara Alexander	7	7	8	22
5	Riaghan Boardman	8	8	7	23
6	Rainne Isibeal Marzo	6	7	6	19
7	Grace Nic Giolla Channáin	6	7	5	18

The second heat of Junior Eurovision Éire was broadcast on 19 September 2021, with Brian Kennedy as the guest judge.

Draw	Artist	Song	Stars	Result
01	Shannon Copeland	"Halo" (Beyoncé)	26	Semi-Final
02	Cora Harkin	"Catch Me If You Can" (Walking on Cars)	25	Final duel
03	Sienna Hopkins	"Nervous" (Gavin James)	25	Final duel
04	Zara Alexander	"Stay with Me" (Sam Smith)	22	Eliminated
05	Riaghan Boardman	"Bruises" (Lewis Capaldi)	23	Eliminated
06	Rainne Isibeal Marzo	"Pompeii" (Bastille)	19	Eliminated
07	Grace Nic Giolla Channáin	"September Song" (JP Cooper)	18	Eliminated

Final duel
Draw	Artist	Song	Votes	Result
01	Cora Harkin	"Catch Me If You Can" (Walking on Cars)	2	Semi-Final
02	Sienna Hopkins	"Nervous" (Gavin James)	1	Eliminated

Shannon Copeland received the highest number of stars, and advanced directly to the semi-final. Cora Harkin and Sienna Hopkins both advanced to the final duel stage and performed their covers a second time. After their second performances, the jury members selected Cora as the winner, granting a spot in the semi-final.

==== Heat 3 ====
Detailed jury voting results
Draw	Artist	Jury Votes			Total
Draw	Artist	Juror 1	Juror 2	Juror 3	Total
1	Sadbh Breatnach	8	9	8	25
2	Alison McGrath	9	10	8	27
3	Kayden Spooner	7	9	8	24
4	Sophie Lennon	10	10	10	30
5	Cathal Mulvey	7	9	7	23
6	Ciara Hassan	8	8	7	23
7	Maya and Lia Sheils	7	8	7	22

The third heat of Junior Eurovision Éire was broadcast on 26 September 2021, with Jedward as the guest judges.

Draw	Artist	Song	Stars	Result
01	Sadbh Breathnach	"Perfect" (Ed Sheeran)	25	Final duel
02	Alison McGrath	"Castles" (Freya Ridings)	27	Final duel
03	Kayden Spooner	"Lonely World" (Luan Parle)	24	Eliminated
04	Sophie Lennon	"Circle of Life" (Elton John)	30	Semi-Final
05	Cathal Mulvey	"Take My Hand" (Picture This)	23	Eliminated
06	Ciara Hassan	"Dancing with a Stranger" (Sam Smith)	23	Eliminated
07	Maya and Lia Sheils	"The Cup Song" (Anna Kendrick)	22	Eliminated

Final duel
Draw	Artist	Song	Votes	Result
01	Sadbh Breathnach	"Perfect" (Ed Sheeran)	1	Eliminated
02	Alison McGrath	"Castles" (Freya Ridings)	2	Semi-Final

Sophie Lennon received the highest number of stars, and advanced directly to the semi-final. Sadbh Breathnach and Alison McGrath both advanced to the final duel stage and performed their covers a second time. After their second performances, the jury members selected Alison as the winner, granting a spot in the semi-final.

==== Heat 4 ====
Detailed jury voting results
Draw	Artist	Jury Votes			Total
Draw	Artist	Juror 1	Juror 2	Juror 3	Total
1	Julie Cole	9	9	8	26
2	Kate Skelton	8	7	8	23
3	Maiú Levi Lawlor	7	9	8	24
4	Victoria Foster	7	7	8	22
5	Ruby Maher	8	9	8	25
6	Neala Graham	6	5	6	17
7	Katie Coyle	7	6	6	20

The fourth and final heat of Junior Eurovision Éire was broadcast on 3 October 2021, with Mickey Joe Harte as the guest judge.

Draw	Artist	Song	Stars	Result
01	Julie Cole	"I’ll Be There" (Jess Glynne)	26	Semi-Final
02	Kate Skelton	"Grace" (The Wolf Tones)	23	Eliminated
03	Maiú Levi Lawlor	"Hold Back the River" (James Bay)	24	Final duel
04	Victoria Foster	"Shut Up and Dance" (Walk the Moon)	22	Eliminated
05	Ruby Maher	"Hold Me While You Wait" (Lewis Capaldi)	25	Final duel
06	Neala Graham	"Lullaby" (Sigala & Paloma Faith)	17	Eliminated
07	Katie Coyle	"Lost Without You" (Freya Ridings)	20	Eliminated

Final duel
Draw	Artist	Song	Votes	Result
01	Maiú Levi Lawlor	"Hold Back the River" (James Bay)	2	Semi-Final
02	Ruby Maher	"Hold Me While You Wait" (Lewis Capaldi)	1	Eliminated

Julie Cole received the highest number of stars, and advanced directly to the semi-final. Maiú Levi Lawlor and Ruby Maher both advanced to the final duel stage and performed their covers a second time. After their second performances, the jury members selected Maiú as the winner, granting a spot in the semi-final.

==== Semi-final ====
The semi final of Junior Eurovision Éire was broadcast on 10 October 2021, with Lesley Roy as the guest judge.

Draw	Artist	Song	Result
01	Shannon Copeland	"New York" (Paloma Faith)	Eliminated
02	Maiú Levi Lawlor	"Grace" (Lewis Capaldi)	Final duel
03	Alison McGrath	"Ghost" (Ella Henderson)	Eliminated
04	Lilyella Buckley	"Lost Without You" (Freya Ridings)	Finalist
05	Cora Harkin	"Shut Up and Dance" (Walk the Moon)	Eliminated
06	Sophie Lennon	"Hold Me While You Wait" (Lewis Capaldi)	Finalist
07	Julie Cole	"The Man Who Can't Be Moved" (The Script)	Final duel
08	Eva Norton	"Hold My Hand" (Jess Glynne)	Eliminated

Final duel
Draw	Artist	Song	Votes	Result
01	Maiú Levi Lawlor	"Grace" (Lewis Capaldi)	2	Finalist
02	Julie Cole	"The Man Who Can't Be Moved" (The Script)	1	Eliminated

Lilyella Buckley and Sophie Lennon were both chosen by the jury to advance directly to the final. Maiú Levi Lawlor and Julie Cole were both chosen to go through to the final duel stage and performed their covers a second time. After their second performances, the jury members selected Maiú as the winner, granting a spot in the final.

==== Final ====
The final of Junior Eurovision Éire was broadcast on 17 October 2021, with Linda Martin as the guest judge. Each artist performed two songs before the jury decided on two of them to advance to the final duel. In the final duel, Maiú Levi Lawlor was selected as the winner of Junior Eurovision Éire 2021.

Draw	Artist	Song 1	Song 2	Result
01	Sophie Lennon	"Circle of Life" (Elton John)	"It's for You" (Niamh Kavanagh)	Eliminated
02	Maiú Levi Lawlor	"Hold Back the River" (James Bay)	"Only Love Survives" (Ryan Dolan)	Final duel
03	Lilyella Buckley	"Someone You Loved" (Lewis Capaldi)	"Rock'n'Roll Kids" (Paul Harrington & Charlie McGettigan)	Final duel

Detailed jury voting results
Draw	Artist	Jury Votes			Total
Draw	Artist	Linda Martin	Niamh Ní Chróinín	Fiachna Ó Braonáin	Total
1	Lilyella Buckley		X		1
2	Maiú Levi Lawlor	X		X	2

Final duel
Draw	Artist	Song	Votes	Result
01	Lilyella Buckley	"Lost Without You" (Freya Ridings)	1	Runner-up
02	Maiú Levi Lawlor	"Grace" (Lewis Capaldi)	2	Winner

=== Song release ===
Lawlor's song, "Saor (Disappear)" (English: Free) was released on 16 November 2021, along with a music video. It was written by Niall Mooney, Lauren White Murphy, Brendan McCarthy, LA Halvery, Junior Eurovision 2019 entrant Anna Kearney (who also provides backing vocals), Anna Banks and Cyprian Cassar, who wrote entries for Malta in 2018, 2020, 2021, and for Ireland in 2019.

== At Junior Eurovision ==
After the opening ceremony, which took place on 13 December 2021, it was announced that Ireland would perform eighth on 19 December 2021, following Russia and preceding Armenia.

At the end of the contest, Ireland received 44 points, placing 18th out of 19 participating countries.

=== Voting ===
The same voting system that was introduced in the 2017 edition was used, where the results were determined by 50% online voting and 50% jury voting. Every participating broadcaster assembled a national jury that consisted of three music industry professionals and two children aged between 10 and 15 who were citizens of the country they represented. The rankings of those jurors were combined to make an overall top ten.

The online voting consisted of two phases. The first phase of the online voting began on 17 December 2021 when a recap of all the rehearsal performances was shown on the contest's website Junioreurovision.tv before the viewers could vote. After this, voters also had the option to watch longer one-minute clips from each participant's rehearsal. This first round of voting ended on 17 December at 15:59 CET. The second phase of the online voting took place during the live show and began right after the last performance and was open for 15 minutes. International viewers were able to vote for three songs. They were also able to vote for their own country's song. These votes were then turned into points which were determined by the percentage of votes received. For example, if a song received 10% of the votes, it received 10% of the available points.

Points awarded to Ireland
Score	Country
12 points	
10 points	
8 points	
7 points	
6 points	
5 points	Italy
4 points	
3 points	
2 points	
1 point	
Ireland received 39 points from the online vote

Points awarded by Ireland
Score	Country
12 points	Poland
10 points	Ukraine
8 points	Italy
7 points	Armenia
6 points	Albania
5 points	North Macedonia
4 points	Germany
3 points	Bulgaria
2 points	Serbia
1 point	Azerbaijan

==== Detailed voting results ====
Detailed voting results from Ireland
Draw	Country	Juror A	Juror B	Juror C	Juror D	Juror E	Rank	Points
01	Germany	2	13	9	6	12	7	4
02	Georgia	18	18	14	5	9	13	
03	Poland	1	1	1	1	1	1	12
04	Malta	12	10	6	8	13	11	
05	Italy	7	5	5	7	4	3	8
06	Bulgaria	8	4	17	9	5	8	3
07	Russia	14	9	8	11	18	15	
08	Ireland							
09	Armenia	3	7	2	10	14	4	7
10	Kazakhstan	15	15	10	4	11	12	
11	Albania	11	11	11	2	3	5	6
12	Ukraine	5	3	3	3	8	2	10
13	France	6	14	15	18	10	14	
14	Azerbaijan	13	6	4	17	15	10	1
15	Netherlands	10	17	13	15	7	16	
16	Spain	9	12	12	16	17	18	
17	Serbia	16	2	7	14	16	9	2
18	North Macedonia	4	8	18	13	2	6	5
19	Portugal	17	16	16	12	6	17	
