= Poland in the Junior Eurovision Song Contest 2021 =

- Junior Eurovision Song Contest 2021
- Country: Poland
- Selection process: Szansa na Sukces. Eurowizja Junior 2021
- Selection date: Semi-finals; 5 September 2021; 12 September 2021; 19 September 2021; Final; 26 September 2021

Competing entry
- Song: "Somebody"
- Artist: Sara James
- Songwriters: Dominik Buczkowski-Wojtaszek; Jan Bielecki; Patryk Kumór; Tom Martin

Placement
- Final result: 2nd, 218 points

Participation chronology

Poland was represented at the Junior Eurovision Song Contest 2021 in Paris, France. Polish broadcaster Telewizja Polska (TVP) is responsible for the country's participation in the contest, and chose the Polish artist and song through the national selection Szansa na sukces.

== Background ==
Prior to the 2021 contest, Poland had participated in the contest seven times: In 2003 and 2004, Poland finished in last place, and they decided not to participate from 2005 to 2015. The country returned in 2016. Olivia Wieczorek was selected to represent the nation that year with the song "Nie zapomnij". Olivia finished in 11th place out of 17 entries with 60 points. In 2017, Alicja Rega was selected to represent Poland with the song "Mój dom". She finished 8th out of 16 entries with 138 points. In both 2018 and 2019, Poland won the Junior Eurovision Song Contest with Roksana Węgiel and Viki Gabor respectively, becoming the first country to win the contest twice in a row. In 2020, Ala Tracz competed for Poland with the song "I'll Be Standing" which ended up in 9th place out of 12 entries with 90 points.

== Before Junior Eurovision ==
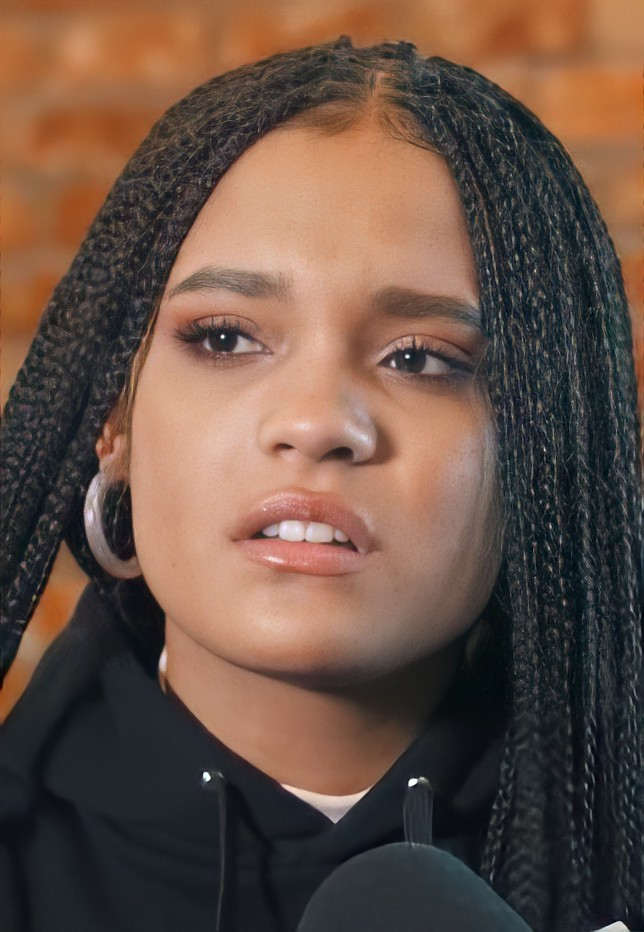
Sara James, the winner of Szansa na Sukces. Eurowizja Junior 2021

TVP selected the Polish representative with the television program Szansa na Sukces; the same show was also used for the Junior Eurovision Song Contest 2019 and 2020, and various times for the Eurovision Song Contest.

=== Szansa na Sukces. Eurowizja Junior 2021 ===
The casting of the show took place on 5 and 6 June, from which twenty-one acts were selected. Like in previous years, the show included three semi-finals, in which a professional jury selected the acts qualified for the final. The winner was decided based on a 50/50 jury and public vote split. The semi-finals were recorded at the end of July and the beginning of August, with the final being broadcast live on 26 September. The show was broadcast on TVP2 and was hosted by Marek Sierocki.

==== Semi-final 1 ====
The first semi-final was broadcast on 5 September 2021. All seven semi-finalists performed past Eurovision and Junior Eurovision songs. The jury consisted of Misha Kostrzewski (dancer and choreographer), Cleo (singer, Polish representative at the 2014 Eurovision Song Contest) and Marianna Józefina Piątkowska (Polish spokesperson at the 2019 and 2020 Junior Eurovision Song Contest).

Semi-final 1 – 5 September 2021
Draw	Artist	Song	Result
1	Zuzanna Gajor	"Anyone I Want To Be"	Eliminated
2	Gabriela Frątczak	"If I Were Sorry"	Eliminated
3	Marysia Stachera	"Arcade"	Advanced
4	Idalia Orman-Borucka	"Superhero"	Eliminated
5	Paulina Ładosz	"Fairytale"	Eliminated
6	Emilia Zuzanna Głodek	"I'll Be Standing"	Eliminated
7	Krystian Gizicki	"Save Your Kisses For Me"	Eliminated

==== Semi-final 2 ====
The second semi-final was broadcast on 12 September 2021. All seven semi-finalists performed songs from the repertoire of Pan Kleks. The jury consisted of Ida Nowakowska (host of the 2019 and 2020 Junior Eurovision Song Contest), Viki Gabor (Junior Eurovision Song Contest 2019 winner) and Maryla Rodowicz (musician).

Semi-final 2 – 12 September 2021
Draw	Artist	Song	Result
1	Patrycja Wsół	"Kaczka Dziwaczka"	Eliminated
2	Miłosz Świetlik Skierski	"Meluzyna"	Advanced
3	Lena Tylus	"Jak rozmawiać trzeba z psem"	Eliminated
4	Maria Chwastek	"Witajcie w naszej bajce"	Eliminated
5	Laura Rumpel	"ZOO (Dzik jest dziki)"	Eliminated
6	Grzegorz Stachera	"Na wyspach Bergamutach"	Eliminated
7	Julia Kołodziejak	"Z poradnika młodego zielarza"	Eliminated

==== Semi-final 3 ====
The third semi-final was broadcast on 19 September 2021. All seven semi-finalists performed songs by ABBA and Celine Dion. The jury consisted of Ala Tracz (Polish representative at the 2020 Junior Eurovision Song Contest), Ray Wilson (musician, former member of the band Genesis) and Paolo Cozza (television personality).

Semi-final 3 – 19 September 2021
Draw	Artist	Song	Result
1	Julia Bieniek	"Dancing Queen"	Eliminated
2	Natalia Smaś	"My Heart Will Go On"	Eliminated
3	Kornelia Wodka	"A New Day Has Come"	Eliminated
4	Lena Mrówczyńska	"The Winner Takes It All"	Eliminated
5	Sara Egwu-James	"That's the Way It Is"	Advanced
6	Michelle Bednarowska	"Waterloo"	Eliminated
7	Martyna Kaczmarek	"Mamma Mia"	Eliminated

==== Final ====
The final was broadcast on 26 September 2021. Three artists competed in the final, and each performed a cover and an original song. The jury consisted of three members: Konrad Smuga (director of Polish performances at Junior Eurovision), Grzegorz Urban (music director of Szansa na Sukces), and Anna Cyzowska-Andura (director of the TVP Entertainment Agency). Another panel, consisting of Roksana Węgiel, Edyta Górniak and Alicja Tracz was also present during the show, but did not have any power over the voting. The winner was 13-year-old Sara Egwu-James, whose song "Somebody" would go on to represent Poland in the Junior Eurovision Song Contest 2021.

Final – 26 September 2021
Artist	Draw	Cover	Draw	JESC song	Songwriter(s)	Jury	Televote	Total	Place
Sara James	1	"My Heart Will Go On"	4	"Somebody"	Dominik Buczkowski-Wojtaszek, Jan Bielecki, Patryk Kumór, Tom Martin	5	5	10	1
Miłosz Świetlik Skierski	2	"Na wyspach Bergamutach"	5	"Open Wide"	Gromee, Sara Chmiel-Gromala	3	1	4	2
Marysia Stachera	3	"Anyone I Want to Be"	6	"One World of Colors"	Gromee, Sara Chmiel-Gromala	1	3	4	3

==== Ratings ====
Viewing figures
Show	Date	Viewing figures		Ref.
Show	Date	Nominal	Share	Ref.
Semi-final 1	5 September 2021	1,096,294	12,99%	
Semi-final 2	12 September 2021	958,405	10,95%	
Semi-final 3	19 September 2021	1,133,594	11,05%	
Final	26 September 2021	1,092,000	12,80%	

== At Junior Eurovision ==
After the opening ceremony, which took place on 13 December 2021, it was announced that Poland would perform third on 19 December 2021, following Georgia and preceding Malta.

At the end of the contest, Poland received 218 points, placing 2nd out of 19 participating countries.

=== Voting ===
The same voting system that was introduced in the 2017 edition was used, where the results were determined by 50% online voting and 50% jury voting. Every participating broadcaster assembled a national jury that consisted of three music industry professionals and two children aged between 10 and 15 who were citizens of the country they represented. The rankings of those jurors were combined to make an overall top ten.

The online voting consisted of two phases. The first phase of the online voting began on 17 December 2021 when a recap of all the rehearsal performances was shown on the contest's website Junioreurovision.tv before the viewers could vote. After this, voters also had the option to watch longer one-minute clips from each participant's rehearsal. This first round of voting ended on 17 December at 15:59 CET. The second phase of the online voting took place during the live show and began right after the last performance and was open for 15 minutes. International viewers were able to vote for three songs. They were also able to vote for their own country's song. These votes were then turned into points which were determined by the percentage of votes received. For example, if a song received 10% of the votes, it received 10% of the available points.

Points awarded to Poland
Score	Country
12 points	Germany; Ireland
10 points	Malta; Netherlands; Ukraine
8 points	Italy; Portugal; Spain
7 points	Serbia
6 points	Bulgaria
5 points	Kazakhstan; North Macedonia
4 points	Albania; Georgia
3 points	Azerbaijan
2 points	France
1 point	Armenia; Russia
Poland received 102 points from the online vote

Points awarded by Poland
Score	Country
12 points	Armenia
10 points	Azerbaijan
8 points	Ukraine
7 points	Kazakhstan
6 points	France
5 points	Italy
4 points	Russia
3 points	Spain
2 points	Malta
1 point	Albania

==== Detailed voting results ====
The following members comprised the Polish jury:

- Ala Tracz – represented Poland in the 2020 contest
- Carla Fernandes
- Gromee – represented Poland in the Eurovision Song Contest 2018
- Krystian Ochman
- Miłosz Świetlik Skierski

Detailed voting results from Poland
Draw	Country	Juror A	Juror B	Juror C	Juror D	Juror E	Rank	Points
01	Germany	18	15	18	14	18	18	
02	Georgia	16	18	8	12	14	15	
03	Poland							
04	Malta	10	9	14	11	2	9	2
05	Italy	5	10	6	4	6	6	5
06	Bulgaria	13	6	13	16	10	13	
07	Russia	4	7	7	9	9	7	4
08	Ireland	15	17	15	17	17	17	
09	Armenia	1	1	1	1	1	1	12
10	Kazakhstan	7	5	3	13	3	4	7
11	Albania	11	8	9	7	8	10	1
12	Ukraine	3	3	11	5	7	3	8
13	France	9	13	5	2	5	5	6
14	Azerbaijan	6	2	2	3	4	2	10
15	Netherlands	14	4	16	8	13	11	
16	Spain	8	12	4	6	12	8	3
17	Serbia	2	14	17	18	16	12	
18	North Macedonia	17	16	12	10	15	16	
19	Portugal	12	11	10	15	11	14	
