= Standby =

Standby may refer to:

- Standby (air travel), a list in which passengers may request to be placed on to request an earlier or more convenient flight
- Standby (theater), an actor or performer who will appear in a particular role if the regular performer is not present
- Sleep mode (in electronics), also known as standby mode—a mode in which electronic appliances are turned off but still under power and ready to activate on command
  - Standby (or ACPI S3), an ACPI mode of a computer
- Modern Standby (or InstantGo), a computer power management system
- Standby power, energy consumed by an electronic device while it is turned off or in sleep mode
- Standby (TV series), a South Korean sitcom
- Standby Records, an American independent record label
- "Standby", a song by Macintosh Plus from Floral Shoppe

== See also ==
- Please Stand By, a 2017 comedy-drama film
- Stand By (disambiguation)
