= Portugal in the Junior Eurovision Song Contest 2021 =

Participation of Portugal in Junior Eurovision in 2021

- Junior Eurovision Song Contest 2021
- Participating broadcaster: Rádio e Televisão de Portugal (RTP)
- Country: Portugal
- Selection process: Artist: The Voice Kids; Song: Internal selection
- Selection date: Artist: 18 April 2021; Song: 12 November 2021

Competing entry
- Song: "O Rapaz"
- Artist: Simão Oliveira
- Songwriters: Fernando Daniel; Diogo Clemente

Placement
- Final result: 11th, 101 points

Participation chronology

Portugal was represented at the Junior Eurovision Song Contest 2021 with the song "O Rapaz", written by Fernando Daniel and Diogo Clemente, and performed by Simão Oliveira. The Portuguese participating broadcaster, Rádio e Televisão de Portugal (RTP), selected Oliveira after he won the second season of The Voice Kids Portugal. The song was internally selected.

Portugal returned to the competition after an absence of one year due to the COVID-19 pandemic.

== Background ==
Prior to the 2021 contest, Portugal participated in the contest five times, first entering in 2006. It finished second-last in both 2006 and 2007, and Rádio e Televisão de Portugal (RTP) withdrew after the 2007 contest, despite high viewing figures. RTP returned in 2017 and participated until 2019. It provisionally confirmed its participation in the 2020 contest, but ultimately withdrew due to the COVID-19 pandemic.

== Artist and song information ==
=== Simão Oliveira ===
Simão Oliveira
- Born: Simão Oliveira; 11 May 2007 (age 19); Arouca, Portugal
- Origin: Portugal
- Genres: Fado, traditional pop
- Instruments: Vocals, clarinet
- Label: Universal Music Portugal

Simão Oliveira (born 11 May 2007) is a fado singer from Arouca, Portugal. He started singing at the age of four, and also plays clarinet. He participated in the second season of The Voice Kids, airing from 10 January 2021. After his blind audition, he joined Team Carlão, but during the battles he was saved by another coach, Fernando Daniel. Oliveira went on to win the final of the competition on 18 April 2021, receiving the most votes through televoting. A few moments before he was announced as the winner, presenter Catarina Furtado announced that the winner of the show will also represent the country at the Junior Eurovision Song Contest. He also won a record contract with Universal Music Portugal.

=== O Rapaz ===
On 27 October 2021, RTP revealed that the country's entry is called "O Rapaz", written by Fernando Daniel and Diogo Clemente. The song was released on 12 November 2021.

== At Junior Eurovision ==
During the opening ceremony and the running order draw, which both took place on 13 December 2021, Portugal was drawn to perform nineteenth (last) on 19 December 2021, following North Macedonia.

At the end of the contest, Portugal received 101 points, placing 11th out of 19 participating countries.

=== Voting ===
The same voting system that was introduced in the 2017 edition was used, where the results were determined by 50% online voting and 50% jury voting. Every participating broadcaster assembled a national jury that consisted of three music industry professionals and two children aged between 10 and 15 who were citizens of the country they represented. The rankings of those jurors were combined to make an overall top ten.

The online voting consisted of two phases. The first phase of the online voting began on 17 December 2021 when a recap of all the rehearsal performances was shown on the contest's website Junioreurovision.tv before the viewers could vote. After this, voters also had the option to watch longer one-minute clips from each participant's rehearsal. This first round of voting ended on 17 December at 15:59 CET. The second phase of the online voting took place during the live show and began right after the last performance and was open for 15 minutes. International viewers were able to vote for three songs. They were also able to vote for their own country's song. These votes were then turned into points which were determined by the percentage of votes received. For example, if a song received 10% of the votes, it received 10% of the available points.

Points awarded to Portugal
Score	Country
12 points	
10 points	
8 points	
7 points	
6 points	
5 points	
4 points	Bulgaria; Malta
3 points	
2 points	
1 point	Ukraine
Portugal received 92 points from the online vote

Points awarded by Portugal
Score	Country
12 points	Armenia
10 points	Azerbaijan
8 points	Poland
7 points	France
6 points	Bulgaria
5 points	Georgia
4 points	Malta
3 points	Spain
2 points	Germany
1 point	Kazakhstan

==== Detailed voting results ====
The following members comprised the Portuguese jury:

- Afonso Silva
- Joana Almeida
- Andrea Basílio
- Elisa – was due to represent Portugal in the Eurovision Song Contest 2020
- Luís Marques

Detailed voting results from Portugal
Draw	Country	Juror A	Juror B	Juror C	Juror D	Juror E	Rank	Points
01	Germany	14	11	16	9	2	9	2
02	Georgia	9	4	15	8	7	6	5
03	Poland	8	2	5	7	1	3	8
04	Malta	17	13	7	4	6	7	4
05	Italy	16	6	18	14	11	16	
06	Bulgaria	3	12	9	1	13	5	6
07	Russia	11	3	11	10	17	12	
08	Ireland	15	18	12	16	14	18	
09	Armenia	5	1	3	6	3	1	12
10	Kazakhstan	12	17	13	2	9	10	1
11	Albania	13	9	14	12	5	14	
12	Ukraine	10	7	17	5	8	11	
13	France	6	5	2	11	4	4	7
14	Azerbaijan	2	8	1	3	12	2	10
15	Netherlands	7	15	4	15	10	13	
16	Spain	1	16	10	13	15	8	3
17	Serbia	4	14	8	18	18	15	
18	North Macedonia	18	10	6	17	16	17	
19	Portugal							
