= Spain in the Junior Eurovision Song Contest 2021 =

- Junior Eurovision Song Contest 2021
- Participating broadcaster: Radiotelevisión Española (RTVE)
- Country: Spain
- Selection process: Internal selection
- Announcement date: Artist: 16 September 2021; Song: 18 October 2021

Competing entry
- Song: "Reír"
- Artist: Levi Díaz
- Songwriters: David Roma

Placement
- Final result: 15th, 77 points

Participation chronology

Spain was represented at the Junior Eurovision Song Contest 2021 with the song "Reír", written by David Roma, and performed by Levi Díaz. The Spanish participating broadcaster, Radiotelevisión Española (RTVE), internally selected its entry for the contest.

== Background ==
Prior to the 2021 contest, Televisión Española (TVE) until 2006, and Radiotelevisión Española (RTVE) since 2019, had participated in the Junior Eurovision Song Contest representing Spain six times since TVE's debut in the inaugural edition. They won in 2004 with the song "Antes muerta que sencilla", performed by María Isabel. In 2020, "Palante" performed by Soleá achieved 3rd place out of 12 entries with 133 points.

== Before Junior Eurovision ==
RTVE internally selected its entry for the Junior Eurovision Song Contest 2021. "Reír" (lit. 'Laugh') is a song performed by Levi Díaz, written by David Roma. The song was revealed on 18 October 2021, along with a lyric video recorded in the streets of Madrid.

Díaz said about the song: "Laughing is very important. They call me the forever smiling kid and we want to share a message of joy."

== At Junior Eurovision ==
After the opening ceremony, which took place on 13 December 2021, it was announced that Spain would perform sixteenth on 19 December 2021, following Netherlands and preceding Serbia.

At the end of the contest, Spain received 77 points, placing 15th out of 19 participating countries. This is the lowest result Spain had achieved at the contest to date.

=== Voting ===
The same voting system that was introduced in the 2017 edition was used, where the results were determined by 50% online voting and 50% jury voting. Every participating broadcaster assembled a national jury that consisted of three music industry professionals and two children aged between 10 and 15 who were citizens of the country they represented. The rankings of those jurors were combined to make an overall top ten.

The online voting consisted of two phases. The first phase of the online voting began on 17 December 2021 when a recap of all the rehearsal performances was shown on the contest's website Junioreurovision.tv before the viewers could vote. After this, voters also had the option to watch longer one-minute clips from each participant's rehearsal. This first round of voting ended on 17 December at 15:59 CET. The second phase of the online voting took place during the live show and began right after the last performance and was open for 15 minutes. International viewers were able vote for three songs. They were also able to vote for their own country's song. These votes were then turned into points which were determined by the percentage of votes received. For example, if a song received 10% of the votes, it received 10% of the available points.

Points awarded to Spain
| Score | Country |
|---|---|
| 12 points | |
| 10 points | |
| 8 points | |
| 7 points | |
| 6 points | Armenia |
| 5 points | Albania |
| 4 points | France; Netherlands |
| 3 points | Poland; Portugal |
| 2 points | Azerbaijan; Kazakhstan |
| 1 point | Germany |
Spain received 47 points from the online vote

Points awarded by Spain
| Score | Country |
|---|---|
| 12 points | Ukraine |
| 10 points | Armenia |
| 8 points | Poland |
| 7 points | France |
| 6 points | Kazakhstan |
| 5 points | Azerbaijan |
| 4 points | Italy |
| 3 points | Russia |
| 2 points | Georgia |
| 1 point | Malta |

==== Detailed voting results ====
The following members comprised the Spanish jury:

- Miguel Linde
- Sonia Gómez
- Rafa Cano
- Carlos Damas
- Melani García

Detailed voting results from Spain
| Draw | Country | Juror A | Juror B | Juror C | Juror D | Juror E | Rank | Points |
|---|---|---|---|---|---|---|---|---|
| 01 | Germany | 12 | 18 | 17 | 9 | 14 | 16 | |
| 02 | Georgia | 8 | 8 | 12 | 8 | 6 | 9 | 2 |
| 03 | Poland | 6 | 5 | 4 | 2 | 4 | 3 | 8 |
| 04 | Malta | 10 | 4 | 10 | 13 | 16 | 10 | 1 |
| 05 | Italy | 15 | 6 | 5 | 6 | 3 | 7 | 4 |
| 06 | Bulgaria | 14 | 10 | 16 | 11 | 9 | 11 | |
| 07 | Russia | 7 | 11 | 13 | 3 | 8 | 8 | 3 |
| 08 | Ireland | 17 | 17 | 8 | 17 | 17 | 17 | |
| 09 | Armenia | 1 | 2 | 2 | 12 | 2 | 2 | 10 |
| 10 | Kazakhstan | 3 | 12 | 7 | 4 | 5 | 5 | 6 |
| 11 | Albania | 16 | 16 | 14 | 15 | 7 | 13 | |
| 12 | Ukraine | 4 | 1 | 1 | 1 | 1 | 1 | 12 |
| 13 | France | 2 | 9 | 3 | 5 | 10 | 4 | 7 |
| 14 | Azerbaijan | 5 | 3 | 6 | 7 | 11 | 6 | 5 |
| 15 | Netherlands | 13 | 13 | 15 | 14 | 15 | 18 | |
| 16 | Spain | | | | | | | |
| 17 | Serbia | 11 | 14 | 18 | 10 | 12 | 15 | |
| 18 | North Macedonia | 9 | 15 | 9 | 16 | 13 | 12 | |
| 19 | Portugal | 18 | 7 | 11 | 18 | 18 | 14 | |
