= Italy in the Junior Eurovision Song Contest 2021 =

- Junior Eurovision Song Contest 2021
- Country: Italy
- Selection process: Internal selection
- Announcement date: 11 November 2021

Competing entry
- Song: "Specchio (Mirror on the Wall)"
- Artist: Elisabetta Lizza
- Songwriters: Fabrizio Palaferri; Franco Fasano; Marco Iardella; Stefano Rigamonti

Placement
- Final result: 10th, 107 points

Participation chronology

Italy was represented at the Junior Eurovision Song Contest 2021 in Paris, France, returning to the competition after a one year absence from the 2020 contest. Italian broadcaster RAI is responsible for the country's participation in the contest. Elisabetta Lizza represented Italy with the song "Specchio (Mirror on the Wall)".

== Background ==
Prior to the 2021 contest, Italy had participated in the Junior Eurovision Song Contest six times since its debut in 2014, having won the contest on their first appearance with the song "Tu primo grande amore", performed by Vincenzo Cantiello. On the country's most recent appearance, in 2019, the Italian broadcaster internally selected Marta Viola to represent Italy at the contest with the song "La voce della terra". She achieved seventh place with 129 points.

Italy withdrew from the 2020 contest due to the COVID-19 pandemic, and despite initially announcing that they would not return in 2021, they ultimately announced their participation in the 2021 contest in France.

== Before Junior Eurovision ==
Upon announcing their return, Italian broadcaster RAI declared that they would internally select the Italian entrant. On 11 November 2021, it was announced that Elisabetta Lizza would be representing Italy at the contest with the rock song "Specchio (Mirror on the Wall)". The song, released on 12 November, was written by Fabrizio Palaferri, Stefano Rigamonti, Marco Iardella and Franco Fasano.

== At Junior Eurovision ==
After the opening ceremony, which took place on 13 December 2021, it was announced that Italy would perform fifth on 19 December 2021, following Malta and preceding Bulgaria.

At the end of the contest, Italy received 107 points, placing 10th out of 19 participating countries.

=== Voting ===
The same voting system that was introduced in the 2017 edition was used, where the results were determined by 50% online voting and 50% jury voting. Every participating broadcaster assembled a national jury that consisted of three music industry professionals and two children aged between 10 and 15 who were citizens of the country they represented. The rankings of those jurors were combined to make an overall top ten.

The online voting consisted of two phases. The first phase of the online voting began on 17 December 2021 when a recap of all the rehearsal performances was shown on the contest's website Junioreurovision.tv before the viewers could vote. After this, voters also had the option to watch longer one-minute clips from each participant's rehearsal. This first round of voting ended on 17 December at 15:59 CET. The second phase of the online voting took place during the live show and began right after the last performance and was open for 15 minutes. International viewers were able vote for three songs. They were also able to vote for their own country's song. These votes were then turned into points which were determined by the percentage of votes received. For example, if a song received 10% of the votes, it received 10% of the available points.

Points awarded to Italy
Score	Country
12 points	
10 points	Albania
8 points	Bulgaria; Ireland
7 points	
6 points	France; Georgia; Malta; Netherlands
5 points	Poland
4 points	Spain
3 points	
2 points	
1 point	Azerbaijan
Italy received 47 points from the online vote

Points awarded by Italy
Score	Country
12 points	Azerbaijan
10 points	Bulgaria
8 points	Poland
7 points	Georgia
6 points	Serbia
5 points	Ireland
4 points	Netherlands
3 points	France
2 points	Malta
1 point	Kazakhstan

==== Detailed voting results ====
Detailed voting results from Italy
Draw	Country	Juror A	Juror B	Juror C	Juror D	Juror E	Rank	Points
01	Germany	17	17	8	16	17	18	
02	Georgia	1	16	11	1	8	4	7
03	Poland	2	3	1	9	7	3	8
04	Malta	11	12	2	18	12	9	2
05	Italy							
06	Bulgaria	4	2	3	3	4	2	10
07	Russia	9	9	10	15	13	14	
08	Ireland	12	4	15	14	1	6	5
09	Armenia	10	14	12	17	5	13	
10	Kazakhstan	6	11	9	8	16	10	1
11	Albania	14	10	13	13	10	16	
12	Ukraine	15	15	5	7	14	12	
13	France	5	8	6	10	11	8	3
14	Azerbaijan	3	1	4	4	2	1	12
15	Netherlands	8	5	14	5	6	7	4
16	Spain	16	13	7	11	15	15	
17	Serbia	13	6	16	2	3	5	6
18	North Macedonia	7	7	17	12	9	11	
19	Portugal	18	18	18	6	18	17	
