= Kazakhstan in the Junior Eurovision Song Contest 2021 =

- Junior Eurovision Song Contest 2021
- Country: Kazakhstan
- Selection process: National Final
- Selection date: 6 November 2021

Competing entry
- Song: "Ertegı älemı (Fairy World)"
- Artist: Alinur Khamzin and Beknur Zhanibekuly
- Songwriters: Nurbolat Qanay; Gabriel Boileau Cloutier

Placement
- Final result: 8th, 121 points

Participation chronology

Kazakhstan was represented at the Junior Eurovision Song Contest 2021. The Kazakh entrant for the 2021 contest in Paris, France was selected through a national selection, organised by the Kazakh broadcaster Khabar Agency (KA). The semi-final took place online between 8 and 12 October 2021, while the final took place on 6 November 2021.

Alinur Khamzin and Beknur Zhanibekuly were selected to represent Kazakhstan with the song "Ertegı älemı (Fairy World)".

== Background ==
Prior to the 2021 contest, Kazakhstan's highest placing in the contest was in 2019 and 2020, represented by Yerzhan Maxim with the song "Armanyńnan qalma" and Karakat Bashanova with the song "Forever", respectively, both achieving second place.

As Khabar Agency (KA) is not an active member of the European Broadcasting Union (EBU), the broadcaster requires a special invitation from the EBU to participate in Eurovision events. Khabar was first invited to participate in the Junior Eurovision Song Contest in 2018. Channel 31 had previously expressed their ambitions to debut in the 2018 contest, and had sent a delegation to the 2017 contest.

== Before Junior Eurovision ==
=== National final ===
Kazakhstan's participation in the 2021 contest was confirmed in September 2021, having been invited to participate by the European Broadcasting Union (EBU). Khabar announced during a press conference on 29 September 2021 that artists will be able to submit their applications for the national final until 6 October 2021. From all applications submitted, a jury panel selected 30 acts for the online semi-final. The jury consisted of Khamit Shangaliev (composer of the 2019 and 2020 Kazakh entries), Madina Sadvakasova (singer), Beksultan Kenishkaliev (singer and participant in the 2020 Slavianski Bazaar), Kanat Aytbayev (singer and producer), Yerlan Bekchurin (producer and composer) and Karlygash Abdikarimova (cultural worker and participant in the Slavianski Bazaar).

==== Semi-final ====
The online semi-final took place between 8 and 12 October 2021 where users were able vote for their favorite artists on Khabar's official website. The top ten acts with the most votes proceeded to the televised national final.

Semi-final – 12 October 2021
| Artist | Votes | Place |
|---|---|---|
| Abilkair Zhumabay | 21,602 | 9 |
| Ádel Kúnádilova | — | — |
| Adina Sulenova | 21,456 | 10 |
| Aiganym Amantai | 25,720 | 1 |
| Áıgerim Esmurzaeva | — | — |
| Aınel Asqarova | — | — |
| Aknur Nurjanova | — | — |
| Alimzhan Tugelbai | 22,361 | 8 |
| Alinur Khamzin | 23,444 | 5 |
| Altyn Baıtas | — | — |
| Amina Asgatova | 24,185 | 3 |
| Ańsar Ádilkhanov | — | — |
| Armen Saakyan | 23,463 | 4 |
| Arujan Ermek | — | — |
| Aya Qurmanǵalı | — | — |
| Ayana Tólenova | — | — |
| Bayan Mukhiden | — | — |
| Beknur Zhanibekuly | 25,098 | 2 |
| Daliya Smaǵulova | — | — |
| Dinmukhamed Berikov | — | — |
| Ekaterina Tabarina | 22,610 | 6 |
| Eset Áljanov | — | — |
| Eva Shirko | — | — |
| Inju Esimjan | — | — |
| Isatay Bolatkhanuly | — | — |
| Kamila Aǵymbaı | — | — |
| Sabrina Ádilbek | — | — |
| Saǵyn Ómirbaıuly | — | — |
| Sherkhan Arystan | — | — |
| Zhan Makim | 22,481 | 7 |

==== Final ====
The final took place on 6 November 2021 in Nur-Sultan, where ten acts performed their candidate Junior Eurovision songs written for them by composers directly invited by Khabar in a televised production. The winner was determined by a 50/50 combination of both public telephone vote and the votes of jury members made up of music professionals. Beknur Zhanibekuly and Alinur Khamzin were tied for the first place and the tie was to be decided by the jury, however after consultation with the composers of both songs it was ultimately decided that Zhanibekuly and Khamzin would both represent Kazakhstan with the song "Ertegı älemı", retitled as "Ertegı älemı (Fairy World)".

Final – 6 November 2021
| Draw | Artist | Song | Jury | Televote | Total | Place |
|---|---|---|---|---|---|---|
| 1 | Alimzhan Tugelbai | "Senem ali" (Сенем әлі) | 7.8% | 9.3% | 17.1% | 5 |
| 2 | Zhan Makim | "Bile" (Биле) | 8.1% | 6.0% | 14.1% | 9 |
| 3 | Ekaterina Tabarina | "Fotomodel" (Фотомодель) | 4.9% | 4.7% | 9.6% | 10 |
| 4 | Beknur Zhanibekuly | "Human" | 4.9% | 25.6% | 30.5% | 1 |
| 5 | Adina Sulenova | "Akeshim" (Әкешiм) | 3.4% | 12.4% | 15.8% | 7 |
| 6 | Armen Saakyan | "Bala mahabbat" (Бала махаббат) | 11.7% | 3.6% | 15.3% | 8 |
| 7 | Aiganym Amantai | "Armanym" (Арманым) | 10.9% | 14.2% | 25.1% | 4 |
| 8 | Amina Asgatova | "Qimylda" (Қимылда) | 14.3% | 2.2% | 16.5% | 6 |
| 9 | Alinur Khamzin | "Ertegı älemı" (Ертегi алемi) | 17.1% | 13.4% | 30.5% | 1 |
| 10 | Abilkair Zhumabay | "Indigo Bala" (Индиго Бала) | 16.7% | 8.4% | 25.1% | 3 |

== At Junior Eurovision ==
After the opening ceremony, which took place on 13 December 2021, it was announced that Kazakhstan would perform tenth on 19 December 2021, following Armenia and preceding Albania.

At the end of the contest, Kazakhstan received 121 points, placing 8th out of 19 participating countries.

=== Voting ===
The same voting system that was introduced in the 2017 edition was used, where the results were determined by 50% online voting and 50% jury voting. Every participating broadcaster assembled a national jury that consisted of three music industry professionals and two children aged between 10 and 15 who were citizens of the country they represented. The rankings of those jurors were combined to make an overall top ten.

The online voting consisted of two phases. The first phase of the online voting began on 17 December 2021 when a recap of all the rehearsal performances was shown on the contest's website Junioreurovision.tv before the viewers could vote. After this, voters also had the option to watch longer one-minute clips from each participant's rehearsal. This first round of voting ended on 17 December at 15:59 CET. The second phase of the online voting took place during the live show and began right after the last performance and was open for 15 minutes. International viewers were able to vote for three songs. They were also able to vote for their own country's song. These votes were then turned into points which were determined by the percentage of votes received. For example, if a song received 10% of the votes, it received 10% of the available points.

Points awarded to Kazakhstan
| Score | Country |
|---|---|
| 12 points | Russia |
| 10 points | |
| 8 points | Azerbaijan |
| 7 points | France; Malta; Poland |
| 6 points | Spain |
| 5 points | |
| 4 points | Armenia; Ukraine |
| 3 points | Germany |
| 2 points | Serbia |
| 1 point | Bulgaria; Georgia; Italy; Portugal |
Kazakhstan received 57 points from the online vote

Points awarded by Kazakhstan
| Score | Country |
|---|---|
| 12 points | Russia |
| 10 points | Azerbaijan |
| 8 points | Georgia |
| 7 points | France |
| 6 points | Armenia |
| 5 points | Poland |
| 4 points | Germany |
| 3 points | Malta |
| 2 points | Spain |
| 1 point | Netherlands |

==== Detailed voting results ====
Detailed voting results from Kazakhstan
| Draw | Country | Juror A | Juror B | Juror C | Juror D | Juror E | Rank | Points |
|---|---|---|---|---|---|---|---|---|
| 01 | Germany | 5 | 1 | 7 | 9 | 10 | 7 | 4 |
| 02 | Georgia | 6 | 6 | 9 | 3 | 1 | 3 | 8 |
| 03 | Poland | 7 | 4 | 3 | 8 | 4 | 6 | 5 |
| 04 | Malta | 8 | 7 | 6 | 10 | 3 | 8 | 3 |
| 05 | Italy | 9 | 9 | 18 | 5 | 13 | 12 | |
| 06 | Bulgaria | 12 | 16 | 12 | 11 | 15 | 14 | |
| 07 | Russia | 3 | 3 | 1 | 4 | 5 | 1 | 12 |
| 08 | Ireland | 17 | 18 | 17 | 18 | 16 | 18 | |
| 09 | Armenia | 1 | 12 | 10 | 1 | 9 | 5 | 6 |
| 10 | Kazakhstan | | | | | | | |
| 11 | Albania | 10 | 8 | 11 | 6 | 14 | 11 | |
| 12 | Ukraine | 18 | 14 | 15 | 15 | 18 | 16 | |
| 13 | France | 2 | 2 | 4 | 12 | 8 | 4 | 7 |
| 14 | Azerbaijan | 4 | 5 | 2 | 2 | 6 | 2 | 10 |
| 15 | Netherlands | 11 | 10 | 13 | 17 | 2 | 10 | 1 |
| 16 | Spain | 14 | 11 | 5 | 7 | 7 | 9 | 2 |
| 17 | Serbia | 16 | 15 | 16 | 16 | 17 | 17 | |
| 18 | North Macedonia | 13 | 17 | 8 | 13 | 11 | 13 | |
| 19 | Portugal | 15 | 13 | 14 | 14 | 12 | 15 | |
