= Ukraine in the Junior Eurovision Song Contest 2021 =

- Junior Eurovision Song Contest 2021
- Country: Ukraine
- Selection process: National final
- Selection date: 24 October 2021

Competing entry
- Song: "Vazhil"
- Artist: Olena Usenko
- Songwriters: Olena Usenko; Kateryna Komar

Placement
- Final result: 6th, 125 points

Participation chronology

Ukraine was represented at the Junior Eurovision Song Contest 2021, held in Paris, France. Their entrant was Olena Usenko with the song "Vazhil", who won the national selection organised by the Ukrainian broadcaster Suspilne.

== Background ==
Prior to the 2021 contest, Ukraine had participated in the Junior Eurovision Song Contest fifteen times since its debut in 2006. Ukraine never missed a contest since their debut appearance, and won the contest once in 2012 with the song "Nebo", performed by Anastasiya Petryk. The Ukrainian capital Kyiv has hosted the contest twice, at the Palace of Sports in 2009, and the Palace "Ukraine" in 2013. In the 2020 contest, Oleksandr Balabanov represented the country in Warsaw, Poland with the song the "Vidkryvai (Open Up)", placing 7th out of 12 entries with 106 points.

== Before Junior Eurovision ==
=== National final ===
Suspilne announced on 21 June 2021 that Ukraine would be participating at the contest taking place in Paris, France. The broadcaster launched the selection process, with the final to be held on 23 October 2021, on 30 August 2021. Unlike the previous two years, where the national selections took place either online or behind closed doors, the final was the first one since 2017 to be televised live. Originally, the performances were also supposed to take place live, but due to the COVID-19 situation in Ukraine they were pre-recorded, which also caused the final to be pushed forward one day to 24 October, instead of the original date.

==== Competing entries ====
The submissions were accepted from the announcement of the selection until 29 September 2021 with original songs or cover songs of Ukrainian Junior Eurovision entries between 2015 and 2020. On 5 October 2021, a professional jury selected 12 acts from 118 received submissions who proceeded to the national final. 8 original compositions and 4 artists with covers were selected to take part in the selection, with Suspilne holding a competition for the song performed by the four participants without an original song, won by the song "Save This World" composed by Maryna Krut. Daria Rebrova, Daryna Kryvenko, Mariia Tkachuk, Olena Usenko and Rrealina (as Anzhelina McFarlane) had all competed in previous Ukrainian national finals. On 23 October 2021, it was announced by the broadcaster that the song "Angel of Light" performed by Rrealina had been disqualified due to not obtaining the consent of the composer to participate in the final.

==== Final ====
The final, hosted by Darina Krasnovetska and Viktor Dyachenko, took place on 24 October 2021 and saw the eleven remaining competing acts participating in a televised production, where the winner was determined by a combination of the votes of five jury members and an online vote. The contestants who entered with a cover song were assigned the song "Save This World" to perform in the final. The jury panel that was responsible for 5/6 of the final result consisted of: Alyosha (Ukrainian representative at the Eurovision Song Contest 2010), Ihor Kondratiuk (TV host and record producer), Liuba Morozova (musicologist), Ihor Panasov (editor-in-chief of Karabas Live) and Oleksandr Balabanov (Ukrainian representative at the Junior Eurovision Song Contest 2020).

Final – 24 October 2021
Draw	Artist	Song	Jury	Online voting	Total	Place
1	Arsenii Hryshchenko	"Redemption"	23	7	30	7
2	Nana Do	"Svit nadlyudey" (Світ надлюдей)	32	5	37	5
3	Daryna Zinchenko	"Save This World"	25	4	29	8
4	Karina Kornuta	"Save This World"	17	2	19	11
5	Daryna Kryvenko	"Kosy-khmarochosy" (Коси-хмарочоси)	41	10	51	2
6	Veronika Morska	"Save This World"	35	9	44	3
7	Yelyzaveta Petruk	"Save This World"	17	6	23	10
8	Daria Rebrova	"Make Me Happy"	24	3	27	9
9	Sofiia Skvaruk	"Golden Time"	31	1	32	6
10	Mariia Tkachuk	"Pazly svitu" (Пазли світу)	33	8	41	4
11	Olena Usenko	"Vazhil" (Важіль)	52	11	63	1

Detailed jury votes
Draw	Song	I. Kondratiuk	O. Balabanov	Alyosha	I. Panasov	L. Morozova	Total
1	"Redemption"	4	4	9	2	4	23
2	"Svit nadlyudey"	9	8	1	9	5	32
3	"Save This World"	2	11	8	1	3	25
4	"Save This World"	1	2	7	6	1	17
5	"Kosy-khmarochosy"	6	5	10	10	10	41
6	"Save This World"	8	7	6	5	9	35
7	"Save This World"	3	3	5	4	2	17
8	"Make Me Happy"	5	1	4	8	6	24
9	"Golden Time"	7	6	3	7	8	31
10	"Pazly svitu"	11	10	2	3	7	33
11	"Vazhil"	10	9	11	11	11	52

== At Junior Eurovision ==
After the opening ceremony, which took place on 13 December 2021, it was announced that Ukraine would perform twelfth on 19 December 2021, following Albania and preceding France.

At the end of the contest, Ukraine received 125 points, placing 6th out of 19 participating countries.

=== Voting ===
The same voting system that was introduced in the 2017 edition was used, where the results were determined by 50% online voting and 50% jury voting. Every participating broadcaster assembled a national jury that consisted of three music industry professionals and two children aged between 10 and 15 who were citizens of the country they represented. The rankings of those jurors were combined to make an overall top ten.

The online voting consisted of two phases. The first phase of the online voting began on 17 December 2021 when a recap of all the rehearsal performances was shown on the contest's website Junioreurovision.tv before the viewers could vote. After this, voters also had the option to watch longer one-minute clips from each participant's rehearsal. This first round of voting ended on 17 December at 15:59 CET. The second phase of the online voting took place during the live show and began right after the last performance and was open for 15 minutes. International viewers were able vote for three songs. They were also able to vote for their own country's song. These votes were then turned into points which were determined by the percentage of votes received. For example, if a song received 10% of the votes, it received 10% of the available points.

Points awarded to Ukraine
Score	Country
12 points	Bulgaria; Spain
10 points	Ireland
8 points	Poland
7 points	Germany
6 points	Azerbaijan
5 points	
4 points	
3 points	France
2 points	Armenia; Netherlands
1 point	
Ukraine received 63 points from the online vote

Points awarded by Ukraine
Score	Country
12 points	Azerbaijan
10 points	Poland
8 points	Malta
7 points	Armenia
6 points	Georgia
5 points	North Macedonia
4 points	Kazakhstan
3 points	Netherlands
2 points	Serbia
1 point	Portugal

==== Detailed voting results ====
Detailed voting results from Ukraine
Draw	Country	Juror A	Juror B	Juror C	Juror D	Juror E	Rank	Points
01	Germany	17	13	12	16	17	18	
02	Georgia	16	4	1	12	16	5	6
03	Poland	5	5	6	1	1	2	10
04	Malta	1	2	10	5	2	3	8
05	Italy	8	18	9	10	10	15	
06	Bulgaria	12	16	11	4	13	11	
07	Russia	15	15	13	14	14	16	
08	Ireland	9	17	8	17	6	13	
09	Armenia	7	1	3	2	8	4	7
10	Kazakhstan	6	11	14	7	3	7	4
11	Albania	14	14	16	13	15	17	
12	Ukraine							
13	France	18	8	4	15	18	12	
14	Azerbaijan	3	3	2	3	4	1	12
15	Netherlands	10	10	5	8	9	8	3
16	Spain	11	6	15	9	12	14	
17	Serbia	13	7	7	6	11	9	2
18	North Macedonia	2	9	18	11	5	6	5
19	Portugal	4	12	17	18	7	10	1
