= Stand By =

Stand By may refer to:

- "Stand By" (Roman Holliday song), 1983
- "Stand By" (Senit song), 2011
- "Stand By", a song by Natalie Cole from I Love You So, 1979
- "Stand By", a song by Loryn and Rudimental; theme song of the 2019 Cricket World Cup
- "Stand By", a song by Extremoduro, 2002
- Stand By, an EP by the Chills, 2004
- Stand By (film) a 2011 Bollywood film directed by Sanjay Surkar

== See also ==
- Standby (disambiguation)
- Stand by Me (disambiguation)
