= Georgia in the Junior Eurovision Song Contest 2021 =

- Junior Eurovision Song Contest 2021
- Country: Georgia
- Selection process: Artist: Ranina 2021; Song: Internal selection
- Selection date: Artist: 13 November 2021; Song: 14 November 2021

Competing entry
- Song: "Let's Count the Smiles"
- Artist: Niko Kajaia
- Songwriters: Giga Kukhianidze

Placement
- Final result: 4th, 163 points

Participation chronology

Georgia was represented at the Junior Eurovision Song Contest 2021 in Paris, France. The children's talent show Ranina was used for the fourth year in a row to select Georgia's representative, Niko Kajaia, who performed at the contest with the song "Let's Count the Smiles". He finished 4th place out of 19 participating countries.

== Background ==
Prior to the 2021 contest, Georgia had participated in the Junior Eurovision Song Contest thirteen times since its debut in 2007, and since then they have never missed a single contest. Georgia is also the most successful country in the competition, with three victories in 2008, 2011 and 2016. In the 2020 contest, Sandra Gadelia represented Georgia with the song "You Are Not Alone" following her victory in the third season of Ranina, achieving 6th place out of 12 with 111 points.

== Before Junior Eurovision ==
=== Ranina ===
For the fourth year in a row, Georgia used an original children's talent show format, Ranina (Georgian: რანინა), as the selection method for their artist. Georgian broadcaster GPB confirmed that Ranina would be used for the fourth time on 2 September 2021, confirming that the show would begin on 11 September at 10pm GST. The list of participants competing in the show was revealed on 6 September 2021, confirming that the show would once again have 10 competitors.

Contestants
Contestant	Age (Note: As of 6 September 2021, the day when the list of contestants was released by GPB.)	Final place	Episode of elimination
Nikoloz Kajaia ნიკოლოზ ქაჯაია	10 years old	Winner	N/A
Gega Shonia გეგა შონია	11 years old	Runner-up	Final
Barbare Makhatadze ბარბარე მახათაძე	9 years old	3rd place	Final
Datuna Luarsabishvili დათუნა ლუარსაბიშვილი	12 years old	4th place	After semi-final
Guga Nadiradze გუგა ნადირაძე	9 years old	4th place	After semi-final
Keso Rusia კესო რუსია	12 years old	4th place	After semi-final
Ioana Navadze იოანა ნავაძე	9 years old	7th place	After Round 4
Mariam Bukhnikashvili მარიამ ბუხნიკაშვილი	12 years old	8th place	After Round 4
Nini Orkoshneli ნინი ორკოშნელი	10 years old	9th place	After Round 4
Andria Beridze ანდრია ბერიძე	13 years old	10th place	After Round 4

==== Round 1 (11–12 September 2021) ====
The jurors for this round were Elene Kalandadze, Davit Evgenidze and Nukri Kapanadze.

Show 1 – 11 September 2021
Draw	Artist	Song	Jury scores												Final score
Draw	Artist	Song	D. Evgenidze				E. Kalandadze				N. Kapanadze				Final score
1	Nini Orkoshneli (with Nutsa Jghamadze and Niutone)	"Sakatmeshi shep’arula mela" (საქათმეში შეპარულა მელა)	40				40				40				120
1	Nini Orkoshneli (with Nutsa Jghamadze and Niutone)	"Sakatmeshi shep’arula mela" (საქათმეში შეპარულა მელა)	10	10	10	10	10	10	10	10	10	10	10	10	120
2	Nikoloz Kajaia (with Papuna Sharikadze)	"Sakanela" (საქანელა)	40				40				40				120
2	Nikoloz Kajaia (with Papuna Sharikadze)	"Sakanela" (საქანელა)	10	10	10	10	10	10	10	10	10	10	10	10	120
3	Gega Shonia (with Zviad Bolkvadze, Andria Bolkvadze and Niutone)	"Ori rezo" (ორი რეზო)	40				40				40				120
3	Gega Shonia (with Zviad Bolkvadze, Andria Bolkvadze and Niutone)	"Ori rezo" (ორი რეზო)	10	10	10	10	10	10	10	10	10	10	10	10	120
4	Barbare Makhatadze (with Sandro Kvachadze)	"Es sats’q’ali k’urdgheli" (ეს საწყალი კურდღელი)	40				40				40				120
4	Barbare Makhatadze (with Sandro Kvachadze)	"Es sats’q’ali k’urdgheli" (ეს საწყალი კურდღელი)	10	10	10	10	10	10	10	10	10	10	10	10	120
5	Andria Beridze (with Zuka Khutsishvili)	"Simghera siq’varuls hgavs" (სიმღერა სიყვარულს ჰგავს)	40				40				40				120
5	Andria Beridze (with Zuka Khutsishvili)	"Simghera siq’varuls hgavs" (სიმღერა სიყვარულს ჰგავს)	10	10	10	10	10	10	10	10	10	10	10	10	120

Show 2 – 12 September 2021
Draw	Artist	Song	Jury scores												Final score
Draw	Artist	Song	D. Evgenidze				E. Kalandadze				N. Kapanadze				Final score
1	Guga Nadiradze (with Tika Balanchine and New One)	"Esa messa" (ესა მესა)	40				40				40				120
1	Guga Nadiradze (with Tika Balanchine and New One)	"Esa messa" (ესა მესა)	10	10	10	10	10	10	10	10	10	10	10	10	120
2	Keso Rusia (with Giorgi Gigashvili)	"Samshoblos gasakhareblad" (სამშობლოს გასახარებლად)	40				40				40				120
2	Keso Rusia (with Giorgi Gigashvili)	"Samshoblos gasakhareblad" (სამშობლოს გასახარებლად)	10	10	10	10	10	10	10	10	10	10	10	10	120
3	Ioana Navadze (with Nodiko Tatishvili and Dato Londaridze)	"Shen ghimilis deda khar" (შენ ღიმილის დედა ხარ)	40				40				40				120
3	Ioana Navadze (with Nodiko Tatishvili and Dato Londaridze)	"Shen ghimilis deda khar" (შენ ღიმილის დედა ხარ)	10	10	10	10	10	10	10	10	10	10	10	10	120
4	Mariam Bukhnikashvili (with Anna Doi & Beka Gochiashvili)	"Mze" (მზე)	40				40				40				120
4	Mariam Bukhnikashvili (with Anna Doi & Beka Gochiashvili)	"Mze" (მზე)	10	10	10	10	10	10	10	10	10	10	10	10	120
5	Datuna Luarsabishvili (with Sophie Willie and Niutone)	"Gaighime" (გაიღიმე)	40				40				40				120
5	Datuna Luarsabishvili (with Sophie Willie and Niutone)	"Gaighime" (გაიღიმე)	10	10	10	10	10	10	10	10	10	10	10	10	120

==== Round 2 (18–25 September 2021) ====
The jurors for this round were Sopho Toroshelidze, Davit Evgenidze and Paata Godziashvili.

Show 3 – 18 September 2021
Draw	Artist	Song	Jury scores												Final score
Draw	Artist	Song	D. Evgenidze				S. Toroshelidze				P. Godziashvili				Final score
1	Barbare Makhatadze	"Someday My Prince Will Come" (Snow White and the Seven Dwarfs)	39				40				39				118
1	Barbare Makhatadze	"Someday My Prince Will Come" (Snow White and the Seven Dwarfs)	10	9	10	10	10	10	10	10	10	9	10	10	118
2	Andria Beridze	"Can You Feel the Love Tonight" (The Lion King)	39				36				38				113
2	Andria Beridze	"Can You Feel the Love Tonight" (The Lion King)	10	10	10	9	9	9	9	9	10	9	10	9	113
3	Nikoloz Kajaia	"Everybody Wants to Be a Cat" (The Aristocats)	40				40				40				120
3	Nikoloz Kajaia	"Everybody Wants to Be a Cat" (The Aristocats)	10	10	10	10	10	10	10	10	10	10	10	10	120
4	Nini Orkoshneli	"Once Upon a December" (Anastasia)	38				38				38				114
4	Nini Orkoshneli	"Once Upon a December" (Anastasia)	10	9	10	9	10	9	10	9	9	10	10	9	114
5	Gega Shonia	"I Wanna Be like You" (The Jungle Book)	40				40				40				120
5	Gega Shonia	"I Wanna Be like You" (The Jungle Book)	10	10	10	10	10	10	10	10	10	10	10	10	120

Show 4 – 25 September 2021
Draw	Artist	Song	Jury scores												Final score
Draw	Artist	Song	D. Evgenidze				S. Toroshelidze				P. Godziashvili				Final score
1	Mariam Bukhnikashvili	"Beauty and the Beast" (Beauty and the Beast)	39				38				38				115
1	Mariam Bukhnikashvili	"Beauty and the Beast" (Beauty and the Beast)	10	9	10	10	9	9	10	10	9	9	10	10	115
2	Guga Nadiradze	"You've Got a Friend in Me" (Toy Story)	40				39				40				119
2	Guga Nadiradze	"You've Got a Friend in Me" (Toy Story)	10	10	10	10	9	10	10	10	10	10	10	10	119
3	Ioana Navadze	"When She Loved Me" (Toy Story 2)	39				39				39				117
3	Ioana Navadze	"When She Loved Me" (Toy Story 2)	10	9	10	10	10	10	10	9	10	9	10	10	117
4	Datuna Luarsabishvili	"Friend Like Me" (Aladdin)	40				40				40				120
4	Datuna Luarsabishvili	"Friend Like Me" (Aladdin)	10	10	10	10	10	10	10	10	10	10	10	10	120
5	Keso Rusia	"Reflection" (Mulan)	40				40				40				120
5	Keso Rusia	"Reflection" (Mulan)	10	10	10	10	10	10	10	10	10	10	10	10	120

==== Round 3 (14-16 October 2021) ====
The jurors for this round were Maia Mikaberidze, Davit Evgenidze and Giorgi Sikharulidze.

Show 5 - 14 October 2021
Draw	Artist	Song	Jury scores												Final score
Draw	Artist	Song	D. Evgenidze				M. Mikaberidze				G. Sikharulidze				Final score
1	Gega Shonia	"Gudisa, sharat’in" (გუდისა, შარატინ)	40				40				40				120
1	Gega Shonia	"Gudisa, sharat’in" (გუდისა, შარატინ)	10	10	10	10	10	10	10	10	10	10	10	10	120
2	Barbare Makhatadze	"Q’ovel sneulebaze" (ყოველ სნეულებაზე)	40				40				40				120
2	Barbare Makhatadze	"Q’ovel sneulebaze" (ყოველ სნეულებაზე)	10	10	10	10	10	10	10	10	10	10	10	10	120
3	Andria Beridze	"Khokhbis q’elivit lamazi" (ხოხბის ყელივით ლამაზი)	40				40				40				120
3	Andria Beridze	"Khokhbis q’elivit lamazi" (ხოხბის ყელივით ლამაზი)	10	10	10	10	10	10	10	10	10	10	10	10	120
4	Nini Orskoshneli	"K’olkhuri nana" (კოლხური ნანა)	40				40				40				120
4	Nini Orskoshneli	"K’olkhuri nana" (კოლხური ნანა)	10	10	10	10	10	10	10	10	10	10	10	10	120
5	Nikoloz Kajaia	"Guruli perkhuli" (გურული ფერხული)	40				40				40				120
5	Nikoloz Kajaia	"Guruli perkhuli" (გურული ფერხული)	10	10	10	10	10	10	10	10	10	10	10	10	120

Show 6 - 16 October 2021
Draw	Artist	Song	Jury scores												Final score
Draw	Artist	Song	D. Evgenidze				M. Mikaberidze				G. Sikharulidze				Final score
1	Guga Nadiradze	"Gakhsovs t’urpav" (გახსოვს ტურფავ)	40				40				40				120
1	Guga Nadiradze	"Gakhsovs t’urpav" (გახსოვს ტურფავ)	10	10	10	10	10	10	10	10	10	10	10	10	120
2	Ioana Navadze	"Sdzinavs t’bas" (სძინავს ტბას)	40				40				40				120
2	Ioana Navadze	"Sdzinavs t’bas" (სძინავს ტბას)	10	10	10	10	10	10	10	10	10	10	10	10	120
3	Datuna Luarsabishvili	"Shilduri mravalzhamieri" (შილდური მრავალჟამიერი)	40				40				40				120
3	Datuna Luarsabishvili	"Shilduri mravalzhamieri" (შილდური მრავალჟამიერი)	10	10	10	10	10	10	10	10	10	10	10	10	120
4	Mariam Bukhnikashvili	"Arami do sharika" (არამი დო შარიქა)	40				40				40				120
4	Mariam Bukhnikashvili	"Arami do sharika" (არამი დო შარიქა)	10	10	10	10	10	10	10	10	10	10	10	10	120
5	Keso Rusia	"Sat’rpialo" (სატრფიალო)	40				40				40				120
5	Keso Rusia	"Sat’rpialo" (სატრფიალო)	10	10	10	10	10	10	10	10	10	10	10	10	120

==== Round 4 (20-23 October 2021) ====
The jurors for this round were Sopho Gelovani, Davit Evgenidze and Liza Bagrationi.

Show 7 - 20 October 2021
Draw	Artist	Song	Jury scores												Final score
Draw	Artist	Song	D. Evgenidze				S. Gelovani				L. Bagrationi				Final score
1	Barbare Makhatadze	"Ich Hab' Noch Einen Koffer In Berlin" (Marlene Dietrich)	40				40				40				120
1	Barbare Makhatadze	"Ich Hab' Noch Einen Koffer In Berlin" (Marlene Dietrich)	10	10	10	10	10	10	10	10	10	10	10	10	120
2	Gega Shonia	"Rosalina" (Fabio Concato)	40				40				40				120
2	Gega Shonia	"Rosalina" (Fabio Concato)	10	10	10	10	10	10	10	10	10	10	10	10	120
3	Nini Orkoshneli	"Dernière danse" (Indila)	40				40				40				120
3	Nini Orkoshneli	"Dernière danse" (Indila)	10	10	10	10	10	10	10	10	10	10	10	10	120
4	Nikoloz Kajaia	"Amar pelos dois" (Salvador Sobral)	40				40				40				120
4	Nikoloz Kajaia	"Amar pelos dois" (Salvador Sobral)	10	10	10	10	10	10	10	10	10	10	10	10	120
5	Andria Beridze	"Hoppípolla" (Sigur Rós)	40				39				40				119
5	Andria Beridze	"Hoppípolla" (Sigur Rós)	10	10	10	10	10	10	9	10	10	10	10	10	119

Show 8 - 23 October 2021
Draw	Artist	Song	Jury scores												Final score
Draw	Artist	Song	D. Evgenidze				S. Gelovani				L. Bagrationi				Final score
1	Mariam Bukhnikashvili	"Hatikvah" (National anthem of Israel)	40				40				40				120
1	Mariam Bukhnikashvili	"Hatikvah" (National anthem of Israel)	10	10	10	10	10	10	10	10	10	10	10	10	120
2	Guga Nadiradze	"Quizás, quizás, quizás" (Bobby Capó)	40				40				40				120
2	Guga Nadiradze	"Quizás, quizás, quizás" (Bobby Capó)	10	10	10	10	10	10	10	10	10	10	10	10	120
3	Ioana Navadze	"чорнобривці" (Chornobryvtsi)	40				40				40				120
3	Ioana Navadze	"чорнобривці" (Chornobryvtsi)	10	10	10	10	10	10	10	10	10	10	10	10	120
4	Datuna Luarsabishvili	"With a Little Help from My Friends" (The Beatles)	40				39				39				118
4	Datuna Luarsabishvili	"With a Little Help from My Friends" (The Beatles)	10	10	10	10	10	10	10	9	10	10	9	10	118
5	Keso Rusia	"Malaika" (Miriam Makeba)	40				40				40				120
5	Keso Rusia	"Malaika" (Miriam Makeba)	10	10	10	10	10	10	10	10	10	10	10	10	120

At the end of Show 8, the semi-finalists were announced. The five participants who collected the most points throughout the four tours advanced to the next round. They are Nikoloz Kajaia, Keso Rusia, Gega Shonia, Guga Nadiradze, Datuna Luarsabishvili and Barbare Makhatadze. Datuna Luarsabishvili and Barbare Makhatadze both took 5th place with the same score. This means that Ranina will have 6 semi-finalists for the first time.

==== Semi-final (6 November 2021) ====
The jurors for the Semi-final were Tika Rukhadze, Davit Evgenidze and Buka Kartozia.

Semi-final (6 November 2021)
Draw	Artist	Song	Result
1	Gega Shonia (with The Quintessence)	"Soplis Masheneblebi" (სოფლის მაშენებლები)	Finalist
2	Keso Rusia (with The Quintessence)	"Romansi" (რომანსი)	Eliminated
3	Guga Nadiradze (with The Quintessence)	"K’omble" (კომბლე)	Eliminated
4	Barbare Makhatadze (with The Quintessence)	"Gogona Da Bat’i" (გოგონა და ბატი)	Finalist
5	Datuna Luarsabishvili (with The Quintessence)	"Isbundi" (ისბუნდი)	Eliminated
6	Nikoloz Kajaia (with The Quintessence)	"Ar Daidardo" & "Shen, Mkholod Shen" (არ დაიდარდო & შენ, მხოლოდ შენ)	Finalist

==== Final (13 November 2021) ====
The jurors for the Final were Sopho Khalvashi, Davit Evgenidze and Beka Gochiashvili.

Final (13 November 2021)
Draw	Artist	Song	Place
1	Nikoloz Kajaia	"Gazapkhuli Maints Mova" (გაზაფხული მაინც მოვა)	1
2	Barbare Makhatadze	"Me Saidumlos Shenakhva Vitsi" (მე საიდუმლოს შენახვა ვიცი)	3
3	Gega Shonia	"Ak Emghereba Guls" (აქ ემღერება გულს)	2

After the solo performances, all three participants performed the song "Khelebi" (ხელები) together with the Gori Girls Choir.

The day after the final was broadcast, the song "Let's Count The Smiles", with which Niko Kajaia would represent Georgia in the Junior Eurovision Song Contest 2021, was released along with a music video. The song was written by Giga Kukhianidze, and contains lyrics in Georgian, English, and French.

== At Junior Eurovision ==
After the opening ceremony, which took place on 13 December 2021, it was announced that Georgia would perform second on 19 December 2021, following Germany and preceding Poland.

At the end of the contest, Georgia received 163 points, placing 4th out of 19 participating countries.

=== Performance ===
Niko Kajaia was accompanied on stage by two dances, Barbare Tvarava and Lizi Kvirkevlia. The three are dressed in primary colours, with colourful shapes shown on the LED screens behind them.

=== Voting ===
The same voting system that was introduced in the 2017 edition was used, where the results were determined by 50% online voting and 50% jury voting. Every participating broadcaster assembled a national jury that consisted of three music industry professionals and two children aged between 10 and 15 who were citizens of the country they represented. The rankings of those jurors were combined to make an overall top ten.

The online voting consisted of two phases. The first phase of the online voting began on 17 December 2021 when a recap of all the rehearsal performances was shown on the contest's website Junioreurovision.tv before the viewers could vote. After this, voters also had the option to watch longer one-minute clips from each participant's rehearsal. This first round of voting ended on 17 December at 15:59 CET. The second phase of the online voting took place during the live show and began right after the last performance and was open for 15 minutes. International viewers were able to vote for three songs. They were also able to vote for their own country's song. These votes were then turned into points which were determined by the percentage of votes received. For example, if a song received 10% of the votes, it received 10% of the available points.

Points awarded to Georgia
Score	Country
12 points	Armenia; France; Malta
10 points	Serbia
8 points	Kazakhstan; North Macedonia
7 points	Azerbaijan; Italy
6 points	Ukraine
5 points	Bulgaria; Netherlands; Portugal
4 points	
3 points	Russia
2 points	Albania; Spain
1 point	
Georgia received 59 points from the online vote

Points awarded by Georgia
Score	Country
12 points	France
10 points	Azerbaijan
8 points	Malta
7 points	Serbia
6 points	Italy
5 points	Armenia
4 points	Poland
3 points	Bulgaria
2 points	North Macedonia
1 point	Kazakhstan

==== Detailed voting results ====
Detailed voting results from Georgia
Draw	Country	Juror A	Juror B	Juror C	Juror D	Juror E	Rank	Points
01	Germany	12	10	10	12	15	13	
02	Georgia							
03	Poland	4	8	13	3	7	7	4
04	Malta	6	5	5	4	5	3	8
05	Italy	5	9	9	2	8	5	6
06	Bulgaria	10	2	8	8	6	8	3
07	Russia	18	16	17	15	18	18	
08	Ireland	11	14	18	7	14	14	
09	Armenia	13	3	4	6	9	6	5
10	Kazakhstan	9	7	6	10	10	10	1
11	Albania	16	17	11	14	17	17	
12	Ukraine	7	11	7	9	12	11	
13	France	1	1	2	1	3	1	12
14	Azerbaijan	3	4	1	5	4	2	10
15	Netherlands	17	6	16	16	11	12	
16	Spain	15	13	15	11	16	15	
17	Serbia	8	12	3	17	1	4	7
18	North Macedonia	2	15	14	13	2	9	2
19	Portugal	14	18	12	18	13	16	
