= Albania in the Junior Eurovision Song Contest 2021 =

- Junior Eurovision Song Contest 2021
- Country: Albania
- Selection process: Junior Fest 2021
- Selection date: 23 October 2021

Competing entry
- Song: "Stand by You"
- Artist: Anna Gjebrea
- Songwriters: Adam Watts; Gannin Arnold; Sani M'airura; Endi Cuci

Placement
- Final result: 14th, 84 points

Participation chronology

Albania was represented at the Junior Eurovision Song Contest 2021 in Paris, France, with the song "Stand by You" performed by Anna Gjebrea. Its entry was selected through the national selection competition Junior Fest 2021 organised by Radio Televizioni Shqiptar (RTSH) in October 2021. The country returned to the contest after an absence of one year due to the COVID-19 pandemic.

== Background ==
Prior to the 2021 contest, Albania had participated in the Junior Eurovision Song Contest six times since its first entry in 2012, only opting not to participate at the 2013, 2014 and 2020 contests. Albania has never won the contest, with their best result being in 2015, with the song "Dambaje" by Mishela Rapo achieving fifth place with a score of 93 points. The country did not participate in 2020 due to the COVID-19 pandemic, but on 18 August 2021, RTSH announced that Albania will participate at the Junior Eurovision Song Contest 2021 following their one-year absence.

== Before Junior Eurovision ==
=== Junior Fest 2021 ===
Although RTSH originally announced on 28 September 2021 that the Albanian entry for the Junior Eurovision Song Contest 2021 would be chosen internally for the first time, this was reversed the following day, when it was revealed that the Albanian representative would be chosen via the national selection competition Junior Fest 2021.

Interested artists were able to send in their applications between 29 September and 15 October 2021. Only final versions of entries were accepted. Eventually 19 acts were selected to compete in the final, which was broadcast on 23 October 2021 on 18:00 CET, but filmed earlier in the RTSH studios in Tirana. The winner was selected exclusively by a jury, whose members were not revealed publicly.

Final – 23 October 2021
Draw	Artist	Song	Songwriter(s)	Place
1	Adea Rreshka	"Botën ndal"	Erdit Shani, Taulant Skënderaj	—
2	Viola Gjyzeli	"A më njihni"	Kristi Bello, Mimoza Bici	—
3	Iris Çarçani	"Per ty mam"	Lambert Jorganxhi, Moza Bici	—
4	Sergita Varfi	"Tek një flutur krahët marr"	Edmond Rrapi, Leidi Shqiponja	—
5	Kristel Qarri	"Nesër"	Alfred Kacinari, Ana Kacinari	—
6	Violeta Beshiri	"Mbi krahët e tu"	Ylli Ramzotti, Mimoza Tola	—
7	Sajana Kodheli	"Si ty"	Sokol Marsi	—
8	Stelios & Artemis Tollkuci	"Këngë e klases tonë"	Miron Kotani, Jorgo Papingji	—
9	Dea & Eva Çutra	"Mesazh nga e ardhmja"	Elvis Peçi	—
10	Ajlis Disha	"Një këshillë"	Liman Maloku, Petrit Koci	—
11	Klara Leti	"Ëndrra ime e vërtetë"	Edmond Mancaku	3
12	Dea Moniku	"Dhurata më ë bukur"	Edmond Zhulali, Arben Duka	—
13	Marina Daka	"Shoqja ime"	Enis Mullaj, Eriona Rushiti	2
14	Altea Kamberi	"Atdheun kam"	Voltan Prodani	—
15	Anna Gjebrea	"Stand by You"	Adam Watts, Gannin Arnold, Sani M'airura, Endi Cuci	1
16	Uarda Dibra & Rosela Gropaj	"Qeni i rruges"	Roland Guli, Meri Guli	—
17	Sibora Teqja	"Jemi ne e ardhmja"	Petrit Terkuci, Mimoza Tola	—
18	Keit Hitaj	"Sekreti është sekret"	Artur Dhamo	—
19	Eizhen Qinami	"Mom"	Eriona Rushiti	—

=== Promotion ===
On 20 November, Anna Gjebrea travelled to North Macedonia to perform "Stand by You" on MRT 2, along with the Macedonian entrant Dajte Muzika.

== At Junior Eurovision ==
The Junior Eurovision Song Contest 2021 took place at La Seine Musicale in Paris, France, on 19 December 2021. After the opening ceremony, which took place on 13 December 2021, it was announced that Albania would perform eleventh on 19 December 2021, following Kazakhstan and preceding Ukraine.

At the end of the contest, Albania received 84 points, placing 14th out of 19 participating countries.

=== Voting ===
The same voting system that was introduced in the 2017 edition was used, where the results were determined by 50% online voting and 50% jury voting. Every participating broadcaster assembled a national jury that consisted of three music industry professionals and two children aged between 10 and 15 who were citizens of the country they represented. The rankings of those jurors were combined to make an overall top ten.

The online voting consisted of two phases. The first phase of the online voting began on 17 December 2021 when a recap of all the rehearsal performances was shown on the contest's website Junioreurovision.tv before the viewers could vote. After this, voters also had the option to watch longer one-minute clips from each participant's rehearsal. This first round of voting ended on 17 December at 15:59 CET. The second phase of the online voting took place during the live show and began right after the last performance and was open for 15 minutes. International viewers were able to vote for three songs. They were also able to vote for their own country's song. These votes were then turned into points which were determined by the percentage of votes received. For example, if a song received 10% of the votes, it received 10% of the available points.

Points awarded to Albania
Score	Country
12 points	
10 points	North Macedonia
8 points	Armenia; France
7 points	Russia
6 points	Ireland
5 points	
4 points	Germany
3 points	
2 points	
1 point	Poland; Netherlands
Albania received 39 points from the online vote

Points awarded by Albania
Score	Country
12 points	North Macedonia
10 points	Italy
8 points	France
7 points	Russia
6 points	Armenia
5 points	Spain
4 points	Poland
3 points	Bulgaria
2 points	Georgia
1 point	Azerbaijan

==== Detailed voting results ====
Detailed voting results from Albania
Draw	Country	Juror A	Juror B	Juror C	Juror D	Juror E	Rank	Points
01	Germany	14	12	8	14	9	13	
02	Georgia	16	7	9	7	10	9	2
03	Poland	9	6	7	5	17	7	4
04	Malta	10	11	10	11	8	11	
05	Italy	2	1	1	2	2	2	10
06	Bulgaria	8	8	6	8	16	8	3
07	Russia	3	4	4	3	4	4	7
08	Ireland	17	15	17	15	15	17	
09	Armenia	7	5	5	10	6	5	6
10	Kazakhstan	13	14	11	9	7	12	
11	Albania							
12	Ukraine	15	17	12	17	14	16	
13	France	4	3	3	4	3	3	8
14	Azerbaijan	5	9	13	12	12	10	1
15	Netherlands	12	16	14	16	13	15	
16	Spain	6	10	16	6	5	6	5
17	Serbia	11	13	15	13	11	14	
18	North Macedonia	1	2	2	1	1	1	12
19	Portugal	18	18	18	18	18	18	
