= Stand by Me =

Stand by Me may refer to:

== Film and television ==
- Stand by Me (film), a 1986 American drama film directed by Rob Reiner, based on the novella The Body by Stephen King
- Stand by Me (TV series), a 1998 Singaporean Mandarin drama series
- Stand by Me Doraemon, a 2014 Japanese 3D CGI-animated film based on the manga series Doraemon by Fujiko Fujio
- "Stand by Me" (Grey's Anatomy), a television episode
- "Stand by Me" (My Little Pony Tales), a television episode

== Literature ==
- Stand by Me, a 2010 novel by Sheila O'Flanagan
- Stand by Me, an autobiography by John Kirwan

== Music ==
=== Albums ===
- Stand by Me (Ernest Tubb album), 1966
- Stand by Me (Whatcha See Is Whatcha Get), by Bernard Purdie, 1971
- Stand by Me: The Ultimate Collection, by Ben E. King, 1987
- Stand by Me, by Ernie Haase & Signature Sound, 2002
- Stand by Me, by Ray Brown Jr., 2007
- Stand by Me, by the Kingdom Choir, 2018

=== Songs ===
- "Stand by Me" (Atomic Rooster song), 1972
- "Stand by Me" (Ben E. King song), 1961 – the most well-known song with the name
- "Stand by Me" (The Brilliant Green song), 2007
- "Stand by Me" (Charles Albert Tindley song), 1905
- "Stand by Me" (John Newman song), 2020
- "Stand by Me" (Lil Durk song), 2023
- "Stand by Me" (Oasis song), 1997
- "Stand by Me" (Shayne Ward song), 2006
- "Train in Vain", also called "Train in Vain (Stand by Me)" in the US, by the Clash, 1980
- "Stand by Me", a 1972 song by Golden Earring
- "Stand by Me", a 1988 song by The Hollies
- "Stand by Me", by SHINee from the Boys Over Flowers soundtrack, 2009

== See also ==
- Stand By (disambiguation)
