= Jon Gregory =

Jon Gregory may refer to:

- Jon Gregory (film editor) (1944-2021), American film editor
- Jon Gregory (music producer) (born 1971), Scottish music producer
