= Wales in the Junior Eurovision Song Contest 2019 =

- Junior Eurovision Song Contest 2019
- Participating broadcaster: Sianel Pedwar Cymru (S4C)
- Country: Wales
- Selection process: Song: Internal selection Artist: Chwilio am Seren
- Selection date: 24 September 2019

Competing entry
- Song: "Calon yn Curo"
- Artist: Erin Mai
- Songwriters: Sylvia Strand; John Gregory; Ed Holden

Placement
- Final result: 18th, 35 points

Participation chronology

Wales was represented at the Junior Eurovision Song Contest 2019 with the song "Calon yn Curo", written by Sylvia Strand, John Gregory, and Ed Holden, and performed by Erin Mai. The Welsh participating broadcaster, Sianel Pedwar Cymru (S4C), selected the song internally and the performer through the televised national final Chwilio am Seren.

== Background ==
Sianel Pedwar Cymru (S4C) announced on 9 May 2018 that it would debut at the Junior Eurovision Song Contest 2018 representing Wales.

A televised national selection process, Chwilio am Seren (English: Search for a Star), was held to select the Welsh entrant. Manw won the national final, held at the Venue Cymru in Llandudno, on 9 October to represent Wales with the internally selected song "Perta", written by Ywain Gwynedd. Wales came last in their debut year at the Junior Eurovision Song Contest. Manw and her song "Perta" received no jury points and only 29 points from the online voting.

Between 2003 and 2005, ITV had participated in the Junior Eurovision Song Contest representing the United Kingdom as a whole, which includes Wales. S4C had also shown interest in participating in the 2008 contest, but in the end decided against participating.

== Before Junior Eurovision ==
=== Chwilio am Seren ===
Chwilio am Seren (Search for a Star) was the national selection process used to select the 2019 entrant. Auditions took take place during April and May 2019 with mentors Connie Fisher, Lloyd Macey and Tara Bethan as the judging panel. The four-part series, produced by Rondo Media for S4C, was aired on Tuesday nights with a repeat broadcast of the first three episodes on Sunday afternoons. The series began on 3 September 2019, seeing three weeks of auditions, before the live grand final on 24 September 2019, held in Llandudno.

The first two shows covered the nationwide auditions. Following a masterclass round at S4C's headquarters in Carmarthen (on the campus of the University of Wales Trinity Saint Davids), the final twenty singers were wittled down to the top 12 who then performed in public at Quadrant Shopping Centre in Swansea. The jury decided at the end of these performances who would perform during a final round live on television.

Table key

Qualifier

Top 12 artists – 17 September 2019
R/O	Artist	Song (performed in Welsh)	Mentor
1	Cerys TJ	"Brwyndro"	Fisher
2	Mared	"Bendigeidfran"	Bethan
3	Sophie	"Dwi'n dy garu di"	Macey
4	Carys	"Adre"	Fisher
5	Henry	"Harbwr Diogel"	Macey
6	Mackenzie	"Gweld y byd mewn lliw"	Bethan
7	Osian	"Sedd Flaen"	Macey
8	Rhiannon	"Dim Ond"	Bethan
9	Cerys	"Cofio Ni"	Fisher
10	Erin	"Dim Gair"	Bethan
11	Maya	"Treiddia'r Mur"	Fisher
12	Y Minis	"Ti a Fi"	Macey

==== National final ====
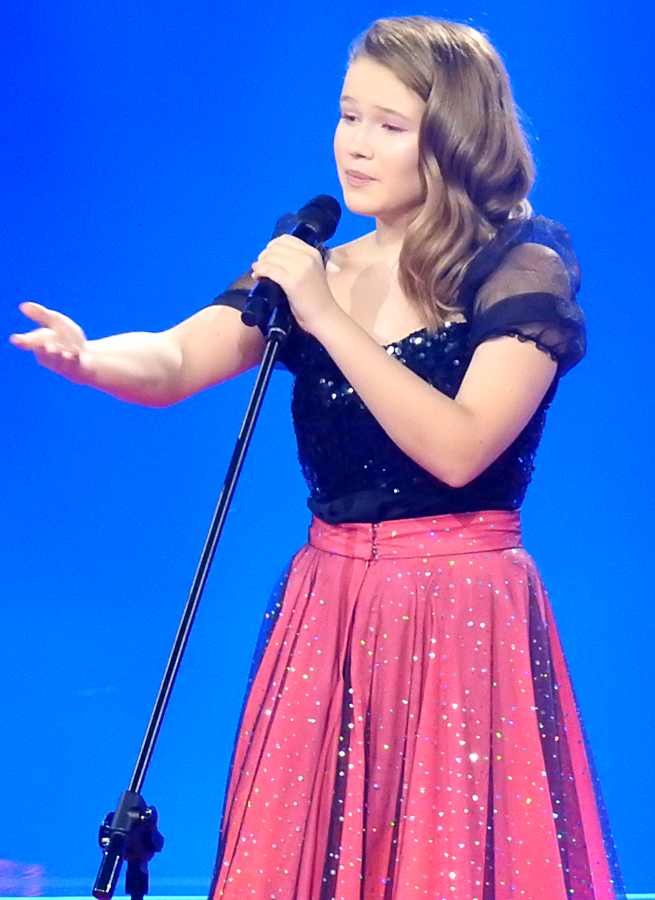
Erin with the song "Calon yn Curo" was the winner of Chwilio am Seren and represented Wales in the Junior Eurovision Song Contest 2019.

The national final took place in Llandudno's Venue Cymru on 24 September 2019, hosted by Trystan Ellis-Morris and broadcast live on S4C. The first round saw the six live finalists performing cover songs. Regional juries (Aberystwyth, Llandudno, Carmarthen, Cardiff and London) consisting of two adults and two children awarded stars (points) to their favourite three performers which were announced by a spokesperson. Each performer automatically received one star from each jury. The three mentors, Fisher, Macey and Bethan all gave their opinions on the performances but could not vote. In the second round, the three superfinalists each performed a different arrangement of the official Welsh entry "Calon yn Curo". Public televoting selected the winner from the second round, this being Erin.

The national final opened with the six finalists performing a Welsh version of the anthem of the Junior Eurovision Song Contest 2014, "Together". During the televote window, a recap of the past edition of Chwilio am Seren was broadcast.

Final – 24 September 2019
R/O	Artist	Song (original artists)	Stars	Place	Result
1	Sophie	"Cae o Yd" (Martin Beatty)	6/10 stars	5	Eliminated
2	Mackenzie & Rhiannon	"Nythod Cacwn" (Super Furry Animals)	8/10 stars	3	Superfinalist
3	Carys	"Croeswn y Dyfroedd Geirwon" (Paul Simon, Iestyn Llwyd)	7/10 stars	4	Eliminated
4	Y Minis	"Hedfan Uwch Na'r Sêr" (Little Mix)	6/10 stars	5	Eliminated
5	Cerys	"Meddwl Amdanat Ti" (Bronwen Lewis)	9/10 stars	1	Superfinalist
6	Erin	"Nos Da Susanna" (CHROMA)	9/10 stars	1	Superfinalist

Detailed Regional Jury Votes
Artist	London	Llandudno	Cardiff	Carmarthen	Aberystwyth	Total
Sophie	1	1	1	2	1	6
Mackenzie & Rhiannon	1	2	2	1	2	8
Carys	2	1	2	1	1	7
Y Minis	1	1	2	1	1	6
Cerys	2	2	1	2	2	9
Erin	2	2	1	2	2	9

Superfinal – 24 September 2019
R/O	Artist	Song
1	Mackenzie & Rhiannon	"Calon yn Curo"
2	Cerys	"Calon yn Curo"
3	Erin	"Calon yn Curo"

==== Ratings ====
Combined viewing figures by show
Show	Date	Viewers (in thousands)	Ref.
Auditions 1	3 September 2019	N/A (<18)	
Auditions 2	10 September 2019	N/A (<14)	
Top 12	17 September 2019	N/A (<16)	
Final	24 September 2019	N/A (<18)	

== At Junior Eurovision ==
During the opening ceremony and the running order draw which both took place on 18 November 2019, Wales was drawn to perform ninth on 24 November 2019, following Malta and preceding Kazakhstan.

On 23 November, S4C broadcast a 30-minute documentary Erin yn Ewrop (Erin in Europe), which followed Erin's journey to the contest. The final was broadcast live in Wales on S4C, with commentary provided by Trystan Ellis-Morris in Welsh. English commentary by Stifyn Parri was available via the red button. It was the 12th most watched show that week on S4C with 24,000 viewers.

=== Voting ===
The same voting system that was introduced in the 2017 edition was used, where the results were determined by 50% online voting and 50% jury voting. Every participating broadcaster assembled a national jury that consisted of three music industry professionals and two children aged between 10 and 15 who were citizens of the country they represented. The rankings of those jurors were combined to make an overall top ten.

The online voting consisted of two phases. The first phase of the online voting began on 22 November 2019 when a recap of all the rehearsal performances was shown on the contest's website Junioreurovision.tv before the viewers could vote. After this, voters also had the option to watch longer one-minute clips from each participant's rehearsal. This first round of voting ended on 24 November at 15:59 CET. The second phase of the online voting took place during the live show and began right after the last performance and was open for 15 minutes. International viewers were able to vote for a minimum of three and a maximum of five songs. They were also able to vote for their own country's song. These votes were then turned into points which were determined by the percentage of votes received. For example, if a song received 10% of the votes, it received 10% of the available points.

Points awarded to Wales
Score	Country
12 points	
10 points	
8 points	
7 points	
6 points	Italy
5 points	
4 points	
3 points	Georgia
2 points	
1 point	
Wales received 26 points from the online vote

Points awarded by Wales
Score	Country
12 points	Kazakhstan
10 points	France
8 points	Georgia
7 points	Spain
6 points	Poland
5 points	Ireland
4 points	Serbia
3 points	Italy
2 points	North Macedonia
1 point	Malta

==== Detailed voting results ====
Detailed voting results from Wales
Draw	Country	Juror A	Juror B	Juror C	Juror D	Juror E	Rank	Points
01	Australia	17	13	7	18	13	14	
02	France	1	12	1	3	2	2	10
03	Russia	18	4	15	10	16	12	
04	North Macedonia	7	11	12	2	9	9	2
05	Spain	16	5	5	7	3	4	7
06	Georgia	4	8	6	4	4	3	8
07	Belarus	11	14	8	5	8	11	
08	Malta	12	7	4	9	6	10	1
09	Wales							
10	Kazakhstan	2	1	2	11	1	1	12
11	Poland	14	18	3	1	10	5	6
12	Ireland	3	2	9	13	12	6	5
13	Ukraine	15	9	13	15	15	16	
14	Netherlands	9	17	17	14	11	15	
15	Armenia	8	16	10	12	14	13	
16	Portugal	13	10	16	17	17	17	
17	Italy	6	3	14	8	7	8	3
18	Albania	10	15	18	16	18	18	
19	Serbia	5	6	11	6	5	7	4
