= Ireland in the Junior Eurovision Song Contest 2019 =

- Junior Eurovision Song Contest 2019
- Country: Ireland
- Selection process: Artist: Junior Eurovision Éire; Song: Internal selection
- Selection date: Heats; 1 September 2019; 8 September 2019; 15 September 2019; 22 September 2019; Semi-Final; 29 September 2019; Final; 6 October 2019

Competing entry
- Song: "Banshee"
- Artist: Anna Kearney
- Songwriters: Niall Mooney; Jonas Gladnikoff; Cyprian Cassar; Daniel Caruana; Fiachna Ó Braonáin; Anna Banks; Anna Kearney

Placement
- Final result: 12th, 73 points

Participation chronology

Ireland was represented at the Junior Eurovision Song Contest 2019, held in Gliwice, Poland, with the song "Banshee" performed by Anna Kearney. The singer was selected though a national final organized by TG4 that between September 1 and October 6. The song was selected internally after Anna Kearney had been selected. This was Ireland's fifth appearance at the Junior Eurovision Song Contest.

== Background ==
Prior to the 2019 contest, Ireland had participated in the Junior Eurovision Song Contest four times since its debut in 2015. TG4 previously attempted to participate at the Junior Eurovision Song Contest 2014, but required funding from the Broadcasting Authority of Ireland (BAI), which was rejected. In the 2018 contest, Taylor Hynes represented country in Minsk, Belarus with the song "IOU". He ended 15th out of 20 entries with 48 points.

== Before Junior Eurovision ==
=== Junior Eurovision Éire ===
==== Heat 1 ====
The participants in heat 1 were revealed on 26 August 2019, with the episode airing on 1 September.

| Draw | Artist | Song (performed in Irish) | Result | Number of stars |
|---|---|---|---|---|
| 01 | Anna Kearney | "Symphony" (Clean Bandit and Zara Larsson) | Final Duel | 25 |
| 02 | Mollie Kennedy | "Stay with Me" (Sam Smith) | Eliminated | 22 |
| 03 | Aoife McNelis | "Always" (Gavin James) | Final Duel | 24 |
| 04 | Arabella Dolan | "Take Me to Church" (Hozier) | Semi-Final | 26 |
| 05 | Ciara McShane | "Take My Hand" (Picture This) | Eliminated | 18 |
| 06 | Joya & Priya | "Wake Me Up" (Avicii and Aloe Blacc) | Eliminated | 21 |
| 07 | Riaghan Boardman | "Shotgun" (George Ezra) | Eliminated | 19 |

Anna Kearney and Aoife McNelis both advanced to the final duel stage and performed their covers a second time. After their second performances, the jury members selected Anna as the winner of this episode, while Arabella was selected to advance to the semi-final.

==== Heat 2 ====
The participants for heat 2 were revealed on 7 September 2019.

| Draw | Artist | Song (performed in Irish) | Result | Number of stars |
|---|---|---|---|---|
| 01 | Caoimhe McBride | "September Song" (JP Cooper) | Final Duel | 23 |
| 02 | Alison McGrath | "Ghost" (Luan Parle) | Semi-Final | 28 |
| 03 | Sophie Whelan | "Speeding Cars" (Walking on Cars) | Eliminated | 22 |
| 04 | Katie Healy | "Feel It Again" (Hudson Taylor) | Final Duel | 25 |
| 05 | Nikki Little | "Illuminate" (Ham Sandwich) | Eliminated | 19 |
| 06 | Rachel Kennedy | "Shape of You" (Ed Sheeran) | Eliminated | 20 |
| 07 | Cairde Ceolmhaire | "Catch & Release" (Matt Simons) | Eliminated | 19 |

Caoimhe McBride and Katie Healy both advanced to the final duel stage and performed their covers a second time. After their second performances, the jury members selected Caoimhe as the winner of this episode, while Alison was selected to advance to the semi-final.

==== Heat 3 ====
The participants for heat 3 were revealed on 13 September 2019.

| Draw | Artist | Song (performed in Irish) | Result | Number of stars |
|---|---|---|---|---|
| 01 | Seisear Séieseach | "When We Were Young" (Picture This) | Final Duel | 25 |
| 02 | Grace Lauhoff | "Thinking Out Loud" (Ed Sheeran) | Eliminated | 22 |
| 03 | Katie O'Connor | "Counting to Sleep" (Wallis Bird) | Eliminated | 23 |
| 04 | Lauren Doherty | "IDGAF" (Dua Lipa) | Eliminated | 22 |
| 05 | Isabelle Moore | "Falling Slowly" (Glen Hansard and Markéta Irglová) | Final Duel | 24 |
| 06 | Savannah Phoenix-Munroe | "Lullaby" (Paloma Faith and Sigala) | Semi-Final | 26 |
| 07 | Daniel Ryan | "Nervous" (Gavin James) | Eliminated | 21 |

Seisear Séieseach and Isabelle Moore both advanced to the final duel stage and performed their covers a second time. After their second performances, the jury members selected Seisear as the winner of this episode, while Savannah was selected to advance to the semi-final.

==== Heat 4 ====
The participants for heat 4 were revealed on 22 September 2019.

| Draw | Artist | Song (performed in Irish) | Result | Number of stars |
|---|---|---|---|---|
| 01 | Skye Murphy Darrer | "Chandelier" (Sia) | Final Duel | 27 |
| 02 | Molly Verider-Cassidy | "The Cup Song" (Carter Family) | Eliminated | 23 |
| 03 | Orla McDermott | "Linger" (The Cranberries) | Semi-Final | 30 |
| 04 | Fionn and Roisin Vigors | "Teenage Dirtbag" (Wheatus) | Eliminated | 21 |
| 05 | Rachel Hoey | "We Couldn't Fake It" (The Coronas) | Eliminated | 20 |
| 06 | Rebecca Cronin | "Perfect" (Ed Sheeran) | Final Duel | 25 |
| 07 | Sophie Bao Garrahy | "I Won't Worry" (This Club) | Eliminated | 23 |

Skye Murphy Darrer and Rebecca Cronin both advanced to the final duel stage and performed their covers a second time. After their second performances, the jury members selected Skye as the winner of this episode, while Orla was selected to advance to the semi-final.

==== Semi-final ====
The semi-final aired on 29 September 2019.

| Draw | Artist | Song (performed in Irish) | Result |
|---|---|---|---|
| 01 | Anna Kearney | "This Is Me" (Keala Settle) | Finalist |
| 02 | Alison McGrath | "Stay with Me" (Sam Smith) | Final Duel |
| 03 | Caoimhe McBride | "Waiting for Love" (Avicii and Simon Aldred) | Eliminated |
| 04 | Seisear Séiseach | "Pompeii" (Bastille) | Eliminated |
| 05 | Savannah Phoenix-Munroe | "Circle of Life" (Elton John) | Finalist |
| 06 | Arabella Dolan | "Friday I'm in Love" (The Cure) | Eliminated |
| 07 | Orla McDermott | "Hold Back the River" (James Bay) | Final Duel |
| 08 | Skye Murphy Darrer | "Shake It Off" (Taylor Swift) | Eliminated |

Anna Kearney and Savannah Phoenix-Munroe were announced as the first two finalists. Alison McGrath and Orla McDermott both advanced to the final duel stage and performed their covers a second time. After their second performances, the jury members selected Orla as the last finalist.

==== Final ====
The final aired on 6 October 2019.

| Artist | Draw | Heat/Semi-Final Song (performed in Irish) | Draw | ESC Winning Song (Original artist, year) | Result |
|---|---|---|---|---|---|
| Anna Kearney | 01 | "Symphony" (Clean Bandit and Zara Larsson) | 04 | "Why Me?" (Linda Martin, 1992) | Final Duel |
| Orla McDermott | 02 | "Linger" (The Cranberries) | 05 | "Rock 'n' Roll Kids" (Paul Harrington and Charlie McGettigan, 1994) | Eliminated |
| Savannah Phoenix-Munroe | 03 | "Circle of Life" (Elton John) | 06 | "Hold Me Now" (Johnny Logan, 1987) | Final Duel |

Final Duel

| Draw | Artist | Heat/Semi-Final Song (performed in Irish) | Result |
|---|---|---|---|
| 01 | Anna Kearney | "Symphony" (Clean Bandit and Zara Larsson) | Winner |
| 02 | Savannah Phoenix-Munroe | "Circle of Life" (Elton John) | Eliminated |

== Artist and song information ==
Anna Kearney
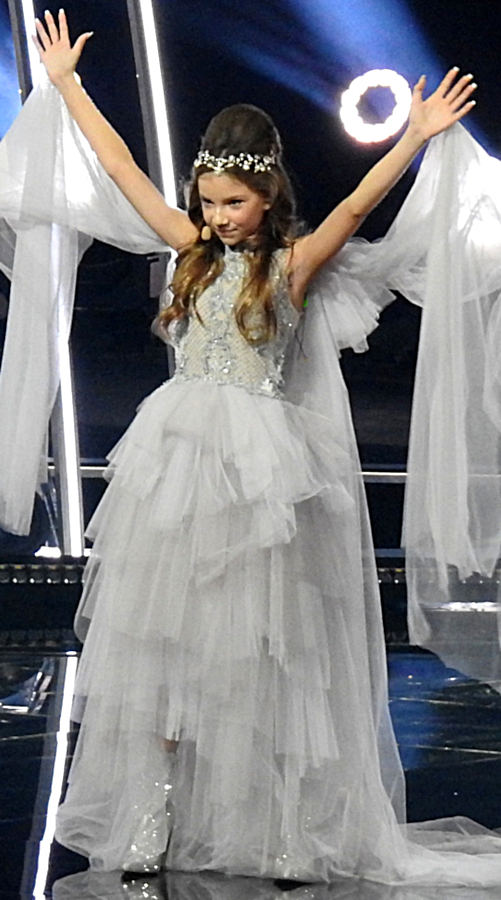

Background information
- Born: 30 January 2006 (age 19); Dublin, Ireland
- Genres: Pop
- Occupation: Singer
- Instrument: Vocals

(Republic of Ireland) "Banshee"

Junior Eurovision Song Contest 2019 entry
- Country: Ireland
- Artist(s): Anna Kearney
- Language: Irish
- Composer(s): Cyprian Cassar; Jonas Gladnikoff; Niall Mooney; Daniel Caruana
- Lyricist(s): Niall Mooney; Fiachna Ó Braonáin; Anna Banks; Anna Kearney

Finals performance
- Final result: 12th
- Final points: 73

Entry chronology
- ◄ "IOU" (2018)
- "Saor" (2021) ►

=== Anna Kearney ===
Anna Kearney (born 30 January 2006) is an Irish child singer. She represented Ireland at the Junior Eurovision Song Contest 2019 with the song "Banshee". She was born in Dublin, but she currently lives in Foxrock. Her mother, Eileen, was a performer in the Eurovision Song Contest 1994 as part of the interval act Riverdance. Shortly after the contest, Kearney opened the 2019 Late Late Toy Show.

=== Banshee ===
"Banshee" is a song by Irish singer Anna Kearney. It represented Ireland at the Junior Eurovision Song Contest 2019. After Anna Kearney had been selected to represent Ireland, TG4 contacted Niall Mooney and Jonas Gladnikoff, who had previously been responsible for the 2015 and 2018 Irish Junior Eurovision entries, to write the song. The song was also co-written by Cyprian Cassar and Daniel Caruana, with lyrics by Anna Banks, Fiachna Ó Braonáin as well as Anna Kearney.

== At Junior Eurovision ==
During the opening ceremony and the running order draw which both took place on 18 November 2019, Ireland was drawn to perform twelfth on 24 November 2019, following Poland and preceding Ukraine.

=== Voting ===
The same voting system that was introduced in the 2017 edition was used, where the results were determined by 50% online voting and 50% jury voting. Every participating broadcaster assembled a national jury that consisted of three music industry professionals and two children aged between 10 and 15 who were citizens of the country they represented. The rankings of those jurors were combined to make an overall top ten.

The online voting consisted of two phases. The first phase of the online voting began on 22 November 2019 when a recap of all the rehearsal performances was shown on the contest's website Junioreurovision.tv before the viewers could vote. After this, voters also had the option to watch longer one-minute clips from each participant's rehearsal. This first round of voting ended on 24 November at 15:59 CET. The second phase of the online voting took place during the live show and began right after the last performance and was open for 15 minutes. International viewers were able vote for a minimum of three and a maximum of five songs. They were also able to vote for their own country's song. These votes were then turned into points which were determined by the percentage of votes received. For example, if a song received 10% of the votes, it received 10% of the available points.

Points awarded to Ireland
| Score | Country |
|---|---|
| 12 points | |
| 10 points | Kazakhstan |
| 8 points | |
| 7 points | |
| 6 points | Russia |
| 5 points | Wales |
| 4 points | France |
| 3 points | Portugal; Spain; Ukraine |
| 2 points | Netherlands; North Macedonia |
| 1 point | Italy |
Ireland received 34 points from the online vote

Points awarded by Ireland
| Score | Country |
|---|---|
| 12 points | Italy |
| 10 points | North Macedonia |
| 8 points | Spain |
| 7 points | Belarus |
| 6 points | Netherlands |
| 5 points | France |
| 4 points | Poland |
| 3 points | Serbia |
| 2 points | Kazakhstan |
| 1 point | Australia |

==== Detailed voting results ====
Detailed voting results from Ireland
| Draw | Country | Juror A | Juror B | Juror C | Juror D | Juror E | Rank | Points |
|---|---|---|---|---|---|---|---|---|
| 01 | Australia | 3 | 9 | 10 | 14 | 6 | 10 | 1 |
| 02 | France | 9 | 2 | 7 | 5 | 10 | 6 | 5 |
| 03 | Russia | 11 | 13 | 13 | 6 | 17 | 15 | |
| 04 | North Macedonia | 1 | 4 | 1 | 7 | 13 | 2 | 10 |
| 05 | Spain | 6 | 7 | 3 | 9 | 1 | 3 | 8 |
| 06 | Georgia | 16 | 11 | 4 | 16 | 12 | 13 | |
| 07 | Belarus | 2 | 12 | 14 | 1 | 9 | 4 | 7 |
| 08 | Malta | 15 | 18 | 15 | 13 | 11 | 16 | |
| 09 | Wales | 14 | 6 | 12 | 12 | 14 | 14 | |
| 10 | Kazakhstan | 12 | 8 | 6 | 10 | 3 | 9 | 2 |
| 11 | Poland | 10 | 14 | 5 | 2 | 8 | 7 | 4 |
| 12 | Ireland | | | | | | | |
| 13 | Ukraine | 18 | 15 | 16 | 17 | 18 | 17 | |
| 14 | Netherlands | 8 | 10 | 9 | 4 | 2 | 5 | 6 |
| 15 | Armenia | 13 | 16 | 17 | 3 | 7 | 12 | |
| 16 | Portugal | 17 | 17 | 18 | 18 | 15 | 18 | |
| 17 | Italy | 5 | 1 | 2 | 8 | 4 | 1 | 12 |
| 18 | Albania | 7 | 3 | 8 | 15 | 16 | 11 | |
| 19 | Serbia | 4 | 5 | 11 | 11 | 5 | 8 | 3 |
