= Spain in the Junior Eurovision Song Contest 2019 =

- Junior Eurovision Song Contest 2019
- Participating broadcaster: Radiotelevisión Española (RTVE)
- Country: Spain
- Selection process: Internal selection
- Announcement date: Artist: 24 July 2019; Song: 4 October 2019

Competing entry
- Song: "Marte"
- Artist: Melani García
- Songwriters: Pablo Mora; Manu Chalud

Placement
- Final result: 3rd, 212 points

Participation chronology

Spain was represented at the Junior Eurovision Song Contest 2019 with the song "Marte", written by Pablo Mora and Manu Chalud, and performed by Melani García. The Spanish participating broadcaster, Radiotelevisión Española (RTVE), internally selected its entry for the contest.

== Background ==
Prior to the 2019 contest, Televisión Española (TVE) had participated in the Junior Eurovision Song Contest representing Spain in four consecutive years since its debut in the inaugural edition, having won the contest on their second appearance with the song "Antes muerta que sencilla", performed by María Isabel. Spain came second twice, in both 2003 and 2005, and the remaining Spanish entrant finished in fourth position in 2006. TVE did not return to the contest in 2007, saying that "the Junior Eurovision promotes stereotypes we do not share".

On 25 June 2019, Radiotelevisión Española (RTVE) announced that they would return to the contest in 2019, after a 13-year absence.

== Before Junior Eurovision ==
RTVE announced Melani García as its performer for the Junior Eurovision Song Contest 2019 on 24 July 2019 during the talk show A partir de hoy, hosted by Máximo Huerta and aired on La 1. Her entry's title, "Marte", and a preview of the song were released to the public on 20 September 2019. The song was written and produced by Pablo Mora alongside Manu Chalud, with the collaboration of Melani García and it was released in full on 4 October 2019.

== At Junior Eurovision ==
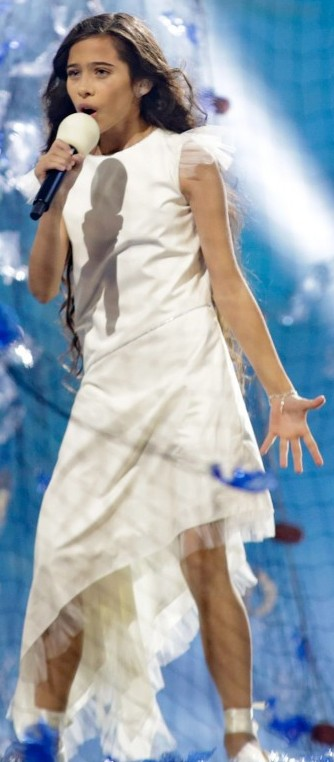
Melani García during her performance.

During the opening ceremony and the running order draw which both took place on 18 November 2019, Spain was drawn to perform fifth on 24 November 2019, following North Macedonia and preceding Georgia. Melani was accompanied on stage by Edurne Rodriguez, Yara Díez, Violeta Leal, and María Mihali.

=== Voting ===
The same voting system that was introduced in the 2017 edition was used, where the results were determined by 50% online voting and 50% jury voting. Every participating broadcaster assembled a national jury that consisted of three music industry professionals and two children aged between 10 and 15 who were citizens of the country they represented. The rankings of those jurors were combined to make an overall top ten.

The online voting consisted of two phases. The first phase of the online voting began on 22 November 2019 when a recap of all the rehearsal performances was shown on the contest's website Junioreurovision.tv before the viewers could vote. After this, voters also had the option to watch longer one-minute clips from each participant's rehearsal. This first round of voting ended on 24 November at 15:59 CET. The second phase of the online voting took place during the live show and began right after the last performance and was open for 15 minutes. International viewers were able to vote for a minimum of three and a maximum of five songs. They were also able to vote for their own country's song. These votes were then turned into points which were determined by the percentage of votes received. For example, if a song received 10% of the votes, it received 10% of the available points.

Points awarded to Spain
Score	Country
12 points	Albania; Italy
10 points	North Macedonia
8 points	France; Ireland; Poland; Portugal
7 points	Belarus; Kazakhstan; Wales
6 points	Ukraine
5 points	Netherlands; Serbia
4 points	Malta
3 points	
2 points	
1 point	Australia
Spain received 104 points from the online vote

Points awarded by Spain
Score	Country
12 points	Poland
10 points	Netherlands
8 points	Kazakhstan
7 points	Armenia
6 points	Belarus
5 points	France
4 points	Serbia
3 points	Ireland
2 points	North Macedonia
1 point	Australia

==== Detailed voting results ====
The following members comprised the Spanish jury:

- María Isabel – winner for Spain in 2004
- Pablo Pinilla (jury chairperson) – composer, songwriter, producer
- Natalia Rodríguez – singer, composer, television host
- Ginebra – child member of the Community of Madrid Orchestra
- Jorge – child member of the Community of Madrid Orchestra

Detailed voting results from Spain
Draw	Country	Juror A	Juror B	Juror C	Juror D	Juror E	Rank	Points
01	Australia	11	13	11	8	10	10	1
02	France	7	8	4	7	5	6	5
03	Russia	10	12	9	14	14	12	
04	North Macedonia	8	7	7	10	6	9	2
05	Spain							
06	Georgia	13	14	15	15	18	15	
07	Belarus	3	4	6	9	8	5	6
08	Malta	12	18	16	18	17	16	
09	Wales	14	15	13	11	12	13	
10	Kazakhstan	4	3	5	2	2	3	8
11	Poland	2	5	1	1	1	1	12
12	Ireland	15	9	12	4	3	8	3
13	Ukraine	17	17	14	17	15	17	
14	Netherlands	1	2	3	3	4	2	10
15	Armenia	6	1	2	6	9	4	7
16	Portugal	18	16	17	16	16	18	
17	Italy	9	10	10	13	13	11	
18	Albania	16	11	18	12	11	14	
19	Serbia	5	6	8	5	7	7	4
