= Kazakhstan in the Junior Eurovision Song Contest 2019 =

- Junior Eurovision Song Contest 2019
- Participating broadcaster: Khabar Agency (KA)
- Country: Kazakhstan
- Selection process: Internal selection
- Announcement date: Artist: 29 July 2019; Song: 10 October 2019

Competing entry
- Song: "Armanyńnan qalma"
- Artist: Yerzhan Maksim
- Songwriters: Aldabergenov Daniyar; Timur Balymbetov; Khamit Shangaliyev

Placement
- Final result: 2nd, 227 points

Participation chronology

Kazakhstan was represented at the Junior Eurovision Song Contest 2019 with the song "Armanyńnan qalma", written by Aldabergenov Daniyar, Timur Balymbetov, and Khamit Shangaliyev, and performed by Yerzhan Maksim. The Kazakh participating broadcaster, Khabar Agency (KA), internally selected its entry for the contest.

== Background ==
On 25 November 2017, Channel 31 of Kazakhstan revealed its intention to participate in the Junior Eurovision Song Contest 2018. Initial claims emerged on 22 December 2017 from both the Kazakh Minister of Culture and Sports, Arystanbek Mukhamediuly; and the Director General of Channel 31, Bagdat Kodzhahmetov; that the channel had applied to become a member of the European Broadcasting Union (EBU), with the hope of participating both in the Eurovision Song Contest and the Junior Eurovision Song Contest. Kodzhahmetov invited Daneliya Tuleshova, winner of the fourth season of Ukraine's version of The Voice Kids, to take part in the casting process to represent Kazakhstan in the Junior Eurovision Song Contest. However, the EBU made a statement the following day rejecting the possibility of any broadcaster from Kazakhstan to become an active member of the EBU, since the country is neither within the European Broadcasting Area nor is a member of the Council of Europe.

== Before Junior Eurovision ==
Prior to the 2018 contest, Channel 31 had sent a delegation to the 2013 and 2017 contests and broadcast the latter live. Channel 31 also stated its intention to broadcast the contests in 2018 and 2019. Khabar Agency (KA) has been an associate member of the EBU since January 2016.

KA announced on 18 July 2019 that it would participate at the Junior Eurovision Song Contest 2019, accepting the special invitation extended by the EBU. On 29 July 2019, KA announced that it had internally selected Yerzhan Maksim to represent Kazakhstan in the contest. His song "Armanyńnan qalma", composed by Khamit Shangaliyev and written by Aldabergenov Daniyar and Timur Balymbetov, was released on 10 October 2019.

== At Junior Eurovision ==
During the opening ceremony and the running order draw which both took place on 18 November 2019, Kazakhstan was drawn to perform tenth on 24 November 2019, following Wales and preceding Poland.

=== Voting ===
The same voting system that was introduced in the 2017 edition was used, where the results were determined by 50% online voting and 50% jury voting. Every participating broadcaster assembled a national jury that consisted of three music industry professionals and two children aged between 10 and 15 who were citizens of the country they represented. The rankings of those jurors were combined to make an overall top ten.

The online voting consisted of two phases. The first phase of the online voting began on 22 November 2019 when a recap of all the rehearsal performances was shown on the contest's website Junioreurovision.tv before the viewers could vote. After this, voters also had the option to watch longer one-minute clips from each participant's rehearsal. This first round of voting ended on 24 November at 15:59 CET. The second phase of the online voting took place during the live show and began right after the last performance and was open for 15 minutes. International viewers were able to vote for a minimum of three and a maximum of five songs. They were also able to vote for their own country's song. These votes were then turned into points which were determined by the percentage of votes received. For example, if a song received 10% of the votes, it received 10% of the available points.

Points awarded to Kazakhstan
Score	Country
12 points	Belarus; Georgia; Netherlands; Poland; Serbia; Ukraine; Wales
10 points	
8 points	Albania; Russia; Spain
7 points	Australia; Italy; Malta
6 points	Portugal
5 points	North Macedonia
4 points	Armenia
3 points	
2 points	France; Ireland
1 point	
Kazakhstan received 79 points from the online vote

Points awarded by Kazakhstan
Score	Country
12 points	Poland
10 points	Ireland
8 points	Australia
7 points	Spain
6 points	Ukraine
5 points	Armenia
4 points	Serbia
3 points	Russia
2 points	France
1 point	Italy

==== Detailed voting results ====
Detailed voting results from Kazakhstan
Draw	Country	Juror A	Juror B	Juror C	Juror D	Juror E	Rank	Points
01	Australia	10	3	2	11	3	3	8
02	France	11	11	7	12	4	9	2
03	Russia	3	6	11	5	14	8	3
04	North Macedonia	12	8	12	14	9	13	
05	Spain	7	13	5	6	1	4	7
06	Georgia	13	10	13	10	15	15	
07	Belarus	14	7	6	13	8	11	
08	Malta	17	12	17	15	12	17	
09	Wales	16	9	18	16	16	16	
10	Kazakhstan							
11	Poland	6	1	1	1	2	1	12
12	Ireland	1	5	4	2	6	2	10
13	Ukraine	9	4	10	3	5	5	6
14	Netherlands	8	15	8	8	11	12	
15	Armenia	2	14	9	4	7	6	5
16	Portugal	18	17	14	17	17	18	
17	Italy	15	16	3	9	10	10	1
18	Albania	5	18	16	18	18	14	
19	Serbia	4	2	15	7	13	7	4
