= Netherlands in the Junior Eurovision Song Contest 2019 =

2019 Junior Eurovision participation

- Junior Eurovision Song Contest 2019
- Country: Netherlands
- Selection process: Junior Songfestival 2019; 33% Jury; 33% Kids Jury; 34% Televoting
- Selection date: 28 September 2019

Competing entry
- Song: "Dans met jou"
- Artist: Matheu
- Songwriters: Jermain van der Bogt; Willem Laseroms

Placement
- Final result: 4th, 186 points

Participation chronology

The Netherlands was represented at the Junior Eurovision Song Contest 2019 which was held on 24 November 2019 in Gliwice, Poland. Matheu was selected with his song "Dans met Jou". Their entry was selected through the national selection Junior Songfestival 2019.

== Background ==
Prior to the 2019 Contest, the Netherlands had participated in the Junior Eurovision Song Contest sixteen times since its first entry in 2003. The Netherlands have won the contest on one occasion: in 2009 with the song "Click Clack" performed by Ralf Mackenbach. In the 2018 contest, Anne & Max represented their country in Minsk, Belarus with the song "Samen". They ended 13th out of 20 entries with 91 points.

== Before Junior Eurovision ==
=== Junior Songfestival 2019 ===
==== Competing entries ====
Artist	Song	Songwriter(s)
Matheu Hinzen	"Dans met jou"	Jermain van der Bogt, Willem Laseroms
6Times	"End of Time"	Jermain van der Bogt, Willem Laseroms
Mannes Bakker	"Let Me Sing"	E. Struijlaart, P. Slager
Moves	"Make Your Move"	Mark van Tijn, Babet van Vugt, Jochem Fluitsma, Eric van Tijn

==== Final ====
The final was held on 28 September 2019 at the Hanzehof Theater. Matheu was announced the winner and represented the Netherlands with "Dans met jou".

Final – 28 September 2019
Draw	Artist	Song	Kids Jury (Note: The members of the kids jury were Max & Anne and Anna.)	Jury (Note: The members of the professional jury were Kaj van der Voot, Tabitha and Edsilia Rombley.)	Televote	Total	Place
1	Moves	"Make Your Move"	10	8	9	27	3
2	Mannes	"Let Me Sing"	9	9	8	26	4
3	6Times	"End of Time"	8	10	10	28	2
4	Matheu	"Dans met jou"	12	12	12	36	1

== Artist and song information ==
Matheu Hinzen
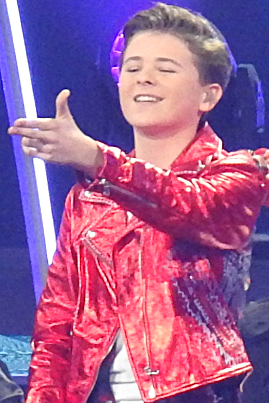

Background information
- Born: Matheu Hinzen; 12 May 2006 (age 20); Antwerp, Belgium
- Occupation: Singer
- Instrument: Vocals

(Netherlands) "Dans met jou"

Junior Eurovision Song Contest 2019 entry
- Country: Netherlands
- Artist: Matheu Hinzen
- As: Matheu
- Languages: Dutch, English
- Composers: Jermain van der Bogt, Willem Laseroms
- Lyricists: Jermain van der Bogt, Willem Laseroms

Finals performance
- Final result: 4th
- Final points: 186

Entry chronology
- ◄ "Samen" (2018)
- "Best Friends" (2020) ►

=== Matheu ===
Matheu Hinzen (born 12 May 2006) is a Belgian-born Dutch singer and actor. He represented the Netherlands at the Junior Eurovision Song Contest 2019 with the song "Dans met jou". He was born in Belgium, but he currently lives in Weert. He also played a young André Hazes in the movie Bloed, zweet & tranen.

=== Dans met jou ===
"Dans met jou" (Dutch for Dance with you) is a song by Dutch singer Matheu Hinzen. He represented the Netherlands at the Junior Eurovision Song Contest 2019.

== At Junior Eurovision ==
During the opening ceremony and the running order draw which both took place on 18 November 2019, Netherlands was drawn to perform fourteenth on 24 November 2019, following Ukraine and preceding Armenia.

=== Voting ===
The same voting system that was introduced in the 2017 edition was used, where the results were determined by 50% online voting and 50% jury voting. Every participating broadcaster assembled a national jury that consisted of three music industry professionals and two children aged between 10 and 15 who were citizens of the country they represented. The rankings of those jurors were combined to make an overall top ten.

The online voting consisted of two phases. The first phase of the online voting began on 22 November 2019 when a recap of all the rehearsal performances was shown on the contest's website Junioreurovision.tv before the viewers could vote. After this, voters also had the option to watch longer one-minute clips from each participant's rehearsal. This first round of voting ended on 24 November at 15:59 CET. The second phase of the online voting took place during the live show and began right after the last performance and was open for 15 minutes. International viewers were able to vote for a minimum of three and a maximum of five songs. They were also able to vote for their own country's song. These votes were then turned into points which were determined by the percentage of votes received. For example, if a song received 10% of the votes, it received 10% of the available points.

Points awarded to the Netherlands
Score	Country
12 points	Armenia; Australia; France; Portugal
10 points	Albania; Spain
8 points	
7 points	
6 points	Ireland; Poland
5 points	Georgia; Italy; Malta
4 points	North Macedonia; Russia
3 points	
2 points	Ukraine
1 point	
The Netherlands received 81 points from the online vote

Points awarded by the Netherlands
Score	Country
12 points	Kazakhstan
10 points	France
8 points	Poland
7 points	North Macedonia
6 points	Australia
5 points	Spain
4 points	Italy
3 points	Serbia
2 points	Ireland
1 point	Belarus

==== Detailed voting results ====
Detailed voting results from the Netherlands
Draw	Country	Juror A	Juror B	Juror C	Juror D	Juror E	Rank	Points
01	Australia	12	3	7	7	1	5	6
02	France	1	1	2	2	8	2	10
03	Russia	14	13	13	10	18	15	
04	North Macedonia	3	6	3	9	3	4	7
05	Spain	4	8	4	3	9	6	5
06	Georgia	13	12	12	6	11	12	
07	Belarus	15	11	5	8	17	10	1
08	Malta	16	17	17	17	16	18	
09	Wales	17	14	14	16	5	13	
10	Kazakhstan	2	2	1	4	2	1	12
11	Poland	5	4	6	1	6	3	8
12	Ireland	7	10	10	11	7	9	2
13	Ukraine	11	15	16	13	13	16	
14	Netherlands							
15	Armenia	10	9	8	15	10	11	
16	Portugal	18	18	18	14	14	17	
17	Italy	9	7	11	5	4	7	4
18	Albania	6	16	15	18	15	14	
19	Serbia	8	5	9	12	12	8	3
