= Albania in the Junior Eurovision Song Contest 2019 =

- Junior Eurovision Song Contest 2019
- Country: Albania
- Selection process: Junior Fest 2019
- Selection date: 29 September 2019

Competing entry
- Song: "Mikja ime fëmijëri"
- Artist: Isea Çili
- Songwriters: Saimir Çili; Jorgo Papingji

Placement
- Final result: 17th, 36 points

Participation chronology

Albania was represented at the Junior Eurovision Song Contest 2019 with the song "Mikja ime fëmijëri" written by Saimir Çili and Jorgo Papingji. The song was performed by Isea Çili. The Albanian entry for the 2019 contest in Gliwice, Poland was selected through a national final organised by the Albanian broadcaster Radio Televizioni Shqiptar (RTSH). The national final consisted of eighteen competing acts participating in a televised production where the winner was determined by 100% votes of jury members made up of music professionals. Isea Çili won the Junior Fest 2019 with the song "Mikja ime fëmijëri", on 29 September 2019.

== Background ==
Prior to the 2019 Contest, Albania had participated in the Junior Eurovision Song Contest five times since its first entry in 2012, only opting not to participate at the 2013 and 2014 contests. Albania has never won the contest, with their best result being in 2015, with the song "Dambaje" performed by Mishela Rapo, achieving fifth place with a score of 93 points. In 2018, Efi Gjika represented Albania in Minsk, Belarus with the song "Barbie". The country ended in 17th place out of 20 countries, achieving 44 points.

== Before Junior Eurovision ==
=== National final ===
The national final, Junior Fest 2019, took place on 29 September 2019. The national final consisted of eighteen competing acts participating in a televised production at the Amphitheater of the Lake Park in Tirana where the winner was determined by 100% votes of jury members made up of music professionals. Isea Çili (born 13 September 2007) was the winner of the national final with the song "Mikja ime fëmijëria".

Draw	Artist	Song
1	Sidorela Dorti, Kleansa Susaj & Juena Tahiri	"Kënga e ngjyrave"
2	Violeta Beshiri	"Ty mbi rërë të vizatoj"
3	Noel Hoxholli	"Jam Shqiptar e bir Shqiptari"
4	Era Okshtuni	"Lunapark"
5	Flavia Doka	"Tinguj zemre"
6	Trisiana Jata	"Gjithësia ime"
7	Livia Nelaj & Estea Teta	"Doli një yll"
8	Bora Llapushi	"Shtet qytete"
9	Marikleda Lejthija	"Jemi fllad i pranverës"
10	Rumejsa Kola	"Ëndërroj"
11	Kristiana Veshaj	"Pushimet"
12	Ajla Rroji	"Ne"
13	Arseld Muça & Martina Serreqi	"Më e shtrenjta botë"
14	Sajana Kodhelli	"Jemi miq te mirë"
15	Françeska Kasa	"Per ty vendi im"
16	Isea Çili	"Mikja ime fëmijëri"
17	Rinea Vitija	"Një botë me dashuri"
18	Uendi Goga	"Mirësevjen"

== At Junior Eurovision ==
During the opening ceremony and the running order draw which both took place on 18 November 2019, Albania was drawn to perform eighteenth on 24 November 2019, following Italy and preceding Serbia.

=== Voting ===
The same voting system that was introduced in the 2017 edition was used, where the results were determined by 50% online voting and 50% jury voting. Every participating broadcaster assembled a national jury that consisted of three music industry professionals and two children aged between 10 and 15 who were citizens of the country they represented. The rankings of those jurors were combined to make an overall top ten.

The online voting consisted of two phases. The first phase of the online voting began on 22 November 2019 when a recap of all the rehearsal performances was shown on the contest's website Junioreurovision.tv before the viewers could vote. After this, voters also had the option to watch longer one-minute clips from each participant's rehearsal. This first round of voting ended on 24 November at 15:59 CET. The second phase of the online voting took place during the live show and began right after the last performance and was open for 15 minutes. International viewers were able vote for a minimum of three and a maximum of five songs. They were also able to vote for their own country's song. These votes were then turned into points which were determined by the percentage of votes received. For example, if a song received 10% of the votes, it received 10% of the available points.

Points awarded to Albania
Score	Country
12 points	
10 points	
8 points	
7 points	
6 points	
5 points	Russia
4 points	
3 points	
2 points	Georgia
1 point	
Albania received 29 points from the online vote

Points awarded by Albania
Score	Country
12 points	Spain
10 points	Netherlands
8 points	Kazakhstan
7 points	North Macedonia
6 points	Armenia
5 points	France
4 points	Serbia
3 points	Georgia
2 points	Poland
1 point	Ukraine

==== Detailed voting results ====
Detailed voting results from Albania
Draw	Country	Juror A	Juror B	Juror C	Juror D	Juror E	Rank	Points
01	Australia	17	10	14	12	8	13	
02	France	7	5	7	13	5	6	5
03	Russia	10	17	12	17	18	17	
04	North Macedonia	3	3	9	6	1	4	7
05	Spain	1	1	2	1	2	1	12
06	Georgia	13	4	6	14	10	8	3
07	Belarus	14	8	17	11	17	15	
08	Malta	12	13	16	9	11	14	
09	Wales	16	14	5	16	12	12	
10	Kazakhstan	4	6	1	5	4	3	8
11	Poland	11	12	13	4	9	9	2
12	Ireland	15	16	10	15	15	16	
13	Ukraine	5	9	11	8	16	10	1
14	Netherlands	2	7	3	2	3	2	10
15	Armenia	8	2	4	3	13	5	6
16	Portugal	18	18	18	18	14	18	
17	Italy	9	15	15	10	6	11	
18	Albania							
19	Serbia	6	11	8	7	7	7	4
