= Georgia in the Junior Eurovision Song Contest 2019 =

- Junior Eurovision Song Contest 2019
- Country: Georgia
- Selection process: Artist: Ranina; Song: Internal selection
- Selection date: Artist: 26 May 2019; Song: 7 October 2019

Competing entry
- Song: "We Need Love"
- Artist: Giorgi Rostiashvili
- Songwriters: David Evgenidze

Placement
- Final result: 14th, 69 points

Participation chronology

Georgia was represented at the Junior Eurovision Song Contest 2019, which was held on 24 November 2019 in Gliwice, Poland.

== Background ==
Prior to the 2019 contest, Georgia had participated in the Junior Eurovision Song Contest eleven times since its debut in 2007, and since then they have never missed a single contest. Georgia is also the most successful country in the competition, with three victories in 2008, 2011 and 2016. In the 2018 contest, Tamar Edilashvili represented her country in Minsk, Belarus with the song "Your Voice".She ended 8th out of 20 entries with 144 points.

== Before Junior Eurovision ==
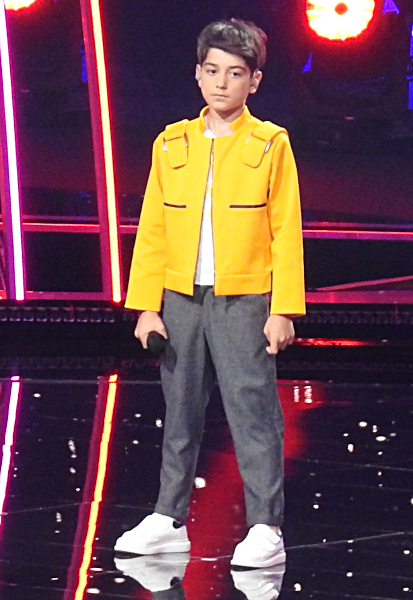
Giorgi Rostiaszvili was the winner of Ranina and represented Georgia in the Junior Eurovision Song Contest 2019.

=== Ranina ===
Georgia used an original children's talent show format, Ranina (Georgian: რანინა), as the selection method for their artist. Starting on 24 March 2019, the show lasted around two months with ten candidate artists.

==== Contestants ====
Contestant	Age (Note: As of 23 February 2019, the day when the list of contestants was released by GPB.)	Final place	Episode of elimination
Giorgi Rostiashvili გიორგი როსთიაშვილი	12 years old	Winner	N/A
Ana Berishvili ანა ბერიშვილი	13 years old	Runner-up	Grand Finale
Anastasia Garsevanishvili ანასთასია გარსევანიშვილი	8 years old	3rd place	Grand Finale
Keta Akhalbedashvili ქეთა ახალბედაშვილი	10 years old	4th place	After Semi-final
Nika Petriashvili ნიქა ფეთრიაშვილი	13 years old	4th place	After Semi-final
Barbara Imnadze ბარბარა იმნაძე	9 years old	6th place	After Round 4
Tekla Chanagava თექლა ჩანაგავა	10 years old	6th place	After Round 4
Levan Eloidze ლევან ელოიძე	11 years old	8th place	After Round 4
Elene Ivanidze ელენე ივანიძე	10 years old	9th place	After Round 4
Giorgi Gordadze გიორგი გორდაძე	13 years old	9th place	After Round 4

==== Shows ====
===== Round 1 (24–31 March 2019) =====
Show 1 (24 March 2019) Songs from Oliver!
Draw	Artist (Guest artist)	Song	Jury scores (Note: The categories for the scores, from left to right, are vocals, performance, artistry and involvement.)												Final score
Draw	Artist (Guest artist)	Song	D. Evgenidze				B. Gochiashvili				S. Korkotashvili				Final score
1	Barbara Imnadze (with Sopho Gelovani)	"Oom-Pah-Pah"	39				37				40				116
1	Barbara Imnadze (with Sopho Gelovani)	"Oom-Pah-Pah"	9	10	10	10	9	8	10	10	10	10	10	10	116
2	Giorgi Gordadze (with Giorgi Sukhitashvili)	"You've Got to Pick a Pocket or Two"	39				37				39				115
2	Giorgi Gordadze (with Giorgi Sukhitashvili)	"You've Got to Pick a Pocket or Two"	10	10	10	9	9	9	10	9	9	9	9	10	115
3	Elene Ivanidze (with Levan Maspindzelashvili)	"Where Is Love?"	40				39				39				118
3	Elene Ivanidze (with Levan Maspindzelashvili)	"Where Is Love?"	10	10	10	10	9	10	10	10	10	10	9	10	118
4	Nika Petriashvili (with Oto Nemsadze)	"Reviewing the Situation"	40				40				40				120
4	Nika Petriashvili (with Oto Nemsadze)	"Reviewing the Situation"	10	10	10	10	10	10	10	10	10	10	10	10	120
5	Anastasia Garsevanishvili (with Mariko Lejava)	"Who Will Buy?"	39				39				39				117
5	Anastasia Garsevanishvili (with Mariko Lejava)	"Who Will Buy?"	9	10	10	10	9	10	10	10	9	10	10	10	117

Show 2 (31 March 2019) Songs from The Sound of Music
Draw	Artist (Guest artist)	Song	Jury scores												Final score
Draw	Artist (Guest artist)	Song	D. Evgenidze				B. Gochiashvili				S. Korkotashvili				Final score
1	Giorgi Rostiashvili (with Sopho Toroshelidze)	"The Hills Are Alive"	40				40				40				120
1	Giorgi Rostiashvili (with Sopho Toroshelidze)	"The Hills Are Alive"	10	10	10	10	10	10	10	10	10	10	10	10	120
2	Tekla Chanagava (with Giorgi Abashidze)	"Sixteen Going on Seventeen"	39				38				39				115
2	Tekla Chanagava (with Giorgi Abashidze)	"Sixteen Going on Seventeen"	9	10	10	10	9	9	10	10	10	9	10	10	115
3	Levan Eloidze (with Elene Kalandadze)	"Edelweiss"	39				36				39				114
3	Levan Eloidze (with Elene Kalandadze)	"Edelweiss"	9	10	10	10	9	9	8	10	9	10	10	10	114
4	Keta Akhalbedashvili (with Sopho Khalvashi)	"My Favorite Things"	40				40				40				120
4	Keta Akhalbedashvili (with Sopho Khalvashi)	"My Favorite Things"	10	10	10	10	10	10	10	10	10	10	10	10	120
5	Ana Berishvili (with Nodiko Tatishvili)	"Climb Ev'ry Mountain"	40				40				40				120
5	Ana Berishvili (with Nodiko Tatishvili)	"Climb Ev'ry Mountain"	10	10	10	10	10	10	10	10	10	10	10	10	120

===== Round 2 (7–14 April 2019) =====
Show 3 (7 April 2019) Guest artists: Shavnabada band
Draw	Artist	Song	Jury scores												Final score
Draw	Artist	Song	D. Evgenidze				M. Mdinaradze				M. Mikaberidze				Final score
1	Nika Petriashvili	"იმერული (ოკრიბული) მგზავრული" ("Imeruli (ok'ribuli) mgzavruli")	40				39				39				118
1	Nika Petriashvili	"იმერული (ოკრიბული) მგზავრული" ("Imeruli (ok'ribuli) mgzavruli")	10	10	10	10	10	9	10	10	10	10	9	10	118
2	Anastasia Garsevanishvili	"შიშ-ნანი" ("Shish-nani")	40				40				40				120
2	Anastasia Garsevanishvili	"შიშ-ნანი" ("Shish-nani")	10	10	10	10	10	10	10	10	10	10	10	10	120
3	Elene Ivanidze	"კესარია" ("Kesaria")	40				39				40				119
3	Elene Ivanidze	"კესარია" ("Kesaria")	10	10	10	10	10	9	10	10	10	10	10	10	119
4	Giorgi Gordadze	"ჩელა" ("Chela")	40				40				40				120
4	Giorgi Gordadze	"ჩელა" ("Chela")	10	10	10	10	10	10	10	10	10	10	10	10	120
5	Barbara Imnadze	"აჭარულ შაირებს" ("Ach'arul shairebs")	40				39				40				119
5	Barbara Imnadze	"აჭარულ შაირებს" ("Ach'arul shairebs")	10	10	10	10	9	10	10	10	10	10	10	10	119

Show 4 (14 April 2019)
Draw	Artist	Song	Jury scores												Final score
Draw	Artist	Song	D. Evgenidze				M. Mdinaradze				M. Mikaberidze				Final score
1	Ana Berishvili	"მარებელს" ("Marebeli")	40				40				40				120
1	Ana Berishvili	"მარებელს" ("Marebeli")	10	10	10	10	10	10	10	10	10	10	10	10	120
2	Levan Eloidze	"ხასანბეგურა" ("Khasanbegura")	40				40				40				120
2	Levan Eloidze	"ხასანბეგურა" ("Khasanbegura")	10	10	10	10	10	10	10	10	10	10	10	10	120
3	Keta Akhalbedashvili	"ვა-გიორქომა" ("Va-giorkoma")	40				40				40				120
3	Keta Akhalbedashvili	"ვა-გიორქომა" ("Va-giorkoma")	10	10	10	10	10	10	10	10	10	10	10	10	120
4	Tekla Chanagava	"ჰარირა" ("Harira")	40				40				40				120
4	Tekla Chanagava	"ჰარირა" ("Harira")	10	10	10	10	10	10	10	10	10	10	10	10	120
5	Giorgi Rostiashvili	"შენ, ბიჭო, ანაგურელო" ("Shen, bich’o, anagurelo")	40				40				40				120
5	Giorgi Rostiashvili	"შენ, ბიჭო, ანაგურელო" ("Shen, bich’o, anagurelo")	10	10	10	10	10	10	10	10	10	10	10	10	120

===== Round 3 (21–28 April 2019) =====
Show 5 (21 April 2019) Guest artists: The Quintessence band
Draw	Artist	Song	Jury scores												Final score
Draw	Artist	Song	D. Evgenidze				R. Kiknadze				M. Datunashvili				Final score
1	Anastasia Garsevanishvili	"მათე ბიჭის სიმღერა" ("Mate bich’is simghera")	40				40				40				120
1	Anastasia Garsevanishvili	"მათე ბიჭის სიმღერა" ("Mate bich’is simghera")	10	10	10	10	40	40	40	40	40	40	40	40	120
2	Barbara Imnadze	"ჩიტო-გვრიტო" ("Chit’o-gvrit’o")	40				40				40				120
2	Barbara Imnadze	"ჩიტო-გვრიტო" ("Chit’o-gvrit’o")	40	40	40	40	40	40	40	40	40	40	40	40	120
3	Giorgi Gordadze	"მთვარის სიმღერას" ("Mtvaris simgheras")	38				40				38				116
3	Giorgi Gordadze	"მთვარის სიმღერას" ("Mtvaris simgheras")	9	9	10	10	10	10	10	10	9	9	10	10	116
4	Elene Ivanidze	"როცა აყვავდა ნუში" ("Rotsa aq’vavda nushi")	38				40				38				116
4	Elene Ivanidze	"როცა აყვავდა ნუში" ("Rotsa aq’vavda nushi")	9	9	10	10	10	10	10	10	9	9	10	10	116
5	Nika Petriashvili	"ერთელ ვიხილე" ("Ertel vikhile")	40				40				40				120
5	Nika Petriashvili	"წავიდეთ ჩქარა" ("Ts’avidet chkara")	10	10	10	10	10	10	10	10	10	10	10	10	120

Show 6 (28 April 2019)
Draw	Artist	Song	Jury scores												Final score
Draw	Artist	Song	D. Evgenidze				R. Kiknadze				M. Datunashvili				Final score
1	Keta Akhalbedashvili	"მზე დედაა ჩემი" ("Mze dedaa chemi")	40				40				40				120
1	Keta Akhalbedashvili	"მზე დედაა ჩემი" ("Mze dedaa chemi")	10	10	10	10	10	10	10	10	10	10	10	10	120
2	Ana Berishvili	"გაზაფხულდა, აყვავილდა ნუში" ("Gazapkhulda, aq'vavilda nushi")	40				40				40				120
2	Ana Berishvili	"გაზაფხულდა, აყვავილდა ნუში" ("Gazapkhulda, aq'vavilda nushi")	10	10	10	10	10	10	10	10	10	10	10	10	120
3	Giorgi Rostiashvili	"ბერიკაობა" ("Berik'aoba")	40				40				40				120
3	Giorgi Rostiashvili	"ბერიკაობა" ("Berik'aoba")	10	10	10	10	10	10	10	10	10	10	10	10	120
4	Levan Eloidze	"პანკესას სიმღერა" ("P'ank'esas simghera")	40				40				40				120
4	Levan Eloidze	"პანკესას სიმღერა" ("P'ank'esas simghera")	10	10	10	10	10	10	10	10	10	10	10	10	120
5	Tekla Chanagava	"პირველი მერცხალი" ("P'irveli mertskhali")	40				40				40				120
5	Tekla Chanagava	"პირველი მერცხალი" ("P'irveli mertskhali")	10	10	10	10	10	10	10	10	10	10	10	10	120

===== Round 4 (5–12 May 2019) =====
Show 7 (5 May 2019) Guest artists: Tbilisi Boys Cappella (თბილისის ბავშვთა კაპელა)
Draw	Artist	Song	Jury scores												Final score
Draw	Artist	Song	D. Evgenidze				S. Khalvashi				N. Tatishvili				Final score
1	Barbara Imnadze	"Uptown Funk"	40				40				40				120
1	Barbara Imnadze	"Uptown Funk"	10	10	10	10	10	10	10	10	10	10	10	10	120
2	Elene Ivanidze	"Over The Rainbow"	38				39				37				114
2	Elene Ivanidze	"Over The Rainbow"	9	9	10	10	9	10	10	10	9	9	9	10	114
3	Giorgi Gordadze	"Man in the Mirror"	38				39				39				116
3	Giorgi Gordadze	"Man in the Mirror"	9	9	10	10	9	10	10	10	9	10	10	10	116
4	Anastasia Garsevanishvili	"Jamaica"	40				40				40				120
4	Anastasia Garsevanishvili	"Jamaica"	10	10	10	10	10	10	10	10	10	10	10	10	120
5	Nika Petriashvili	"Circle of Life"	40				40				40				120
5	Nika Petriashvili	"Circle of Life"	10	10	10	10	10	10	10	10	10	10	10	10	120

Show 8 (12 May 2019) Guest artists: Gori Girls' Choir
Draw	Artist	Song	Jury scores												Final score
Draw	Artist	Song	D. Evgenidze				S. Khalvashi				N. Tatishvili				Final score
1	Tekla Chanagava	"Roar"	40				40				40				120
1	Tekla Chanagava	"Roar"	10	10	10	10	10	10	10	10	10	10	10	10	120
2	Giorgi Rostiashvili	"Moon River"	40				40				40				120
2	Giorgi Rostiashvili	"Moon River"	10	10	10	10	10	10	10	10	10	10	10	10	120
3	Keta Akhalbedashvili	"Java Jive"	39				39				39				117
3	Keta Akhalbedashvili	"Java Jive"	10	9	10	10	9	10	10	10	9	10	10	10	117
4	Ana Berishvili	"Amazing Grace"	40				40				40				120
4	Ana Berishvili	"Amazing Grace"	10	10	10	10	10	10	10	10	10	10	10	10	120
5	Levan Eloidze	"Imagine"	40				39				39				118
5	Levan Eloidze	"Imagine"	10	10	10	10	9	10	10	10	9	10	10	10	118

===== Semi-final (19 May 2019) =====
Semi-final (19 May 2019)
Draw	Artist	Song	Result
1	Nika Petriashvili	"თბილისი" ("Tbilisi")	Eliminated
2	Giorgi Rostiashvili	"რომანსერო" ("Romansero")	Finalist
3	Anastasia Garsevanishvili	"წვიმს, ისევ წვიმს" ("Ts'vims, isev ts'vims")	Finalist
4	Keta Akhalbedashvili	"ჩვენი ზღაპარი" ("Chveni zghvap'ari")	Eliminated
5	Ana Berishvili	"სიზმარს გავხარ" ("Sizmars gavkhar")	Finalist

===== Final (26 May 2019) =====
The winner of the final was Giorgi Rostiashvili, who would go on to represent Georgia with the song "We Want to Love".

Final (26 May 2019) Jury members: Dato Evgenidze, Beka Gochiashvili and Lana Kutateladze
Draw	Artist	Song	Place
1	Anastasia Garsevanishvili	"ჯადოსნური კვერცხი"("Jadosnuri k'vertskhi")	Third place
2	Ana Berishvili	"ჭაღარა თბილისო"("Ch'aghara Tbiliso")	Second place
3	Giorgi Rostiashvili	"ჩარი რამა"("Chari rama")	Winner

== At Junior Eurovision ==
During the opening ceremony and the running order draw which both took place on 18 November 2019, Georgia was drawn to perform sixth on 24 November 2019, following Spain and preceding Belarus.

=== Voting ===
The same voting system that was introduced in the 2017 edition was used, where the results were determined by 50% online voting and 50% jury voting. Every participating broadcaster assembled a national jury that consisted of three music industry professionals and two children aged between 10 and 15 who were citizens of the country they represented. The rankings of those jurors were combined to make an overall top ten.

The online voting consisted of two phases. The first phase of the online voting began on 22 November 2019 when a recap of all the rehearsal performances was shown on the contest's website Junioreurovision.tv before the viewers could vote. After this, voters also had the option to watch longer one-minute clips from each participant's rehearsal. This first round of voting ended on 24 November at 15:59 CET. The second phase of the online voting took place during the live show and began right after the last performance and was open for 15 minutes. International viewers were able to vote for a minimum of three and a maximum of five songs. They were also able to vote for their own country's song. These votes were then turned into points which were determined by the percentage of votes received. For example, if a song received 10% of the votes, it received 10% of the available points.

Points awarded to Georgia
Score	Country
12 points	
10 points	
8 points	Armenia; Wales
7 points	
6 points	
5 points	Australia; Poland
4 points	Serbia
3 points	Albania; North Macedonia
2 points	
1 point	Malta
Georgia received 32 points from the online vote

Points awarded by Georgia
Score	Country
12 points	Kazakhstan
10 points	North Macedonia
8 points	Australia
7 points	Armenia
6 points	Italy
5 points	Netherlands
4 points	Poland
3 points	Wales
2 points	Albania
1 point	Serbia

==== Detailed voting results ====
Detailed voting results from Georgia
Draw	Country	Juror A	Juror B	Juror C	Juror D	Juror E	Rank	Points
01	Australia	2	5	1	4	2	3	8
02	France	13	12	14	11	14	14	
03	Russia	18	18	18	18	18	18	
04	North Macedonia	4	1	4	1	4	2	10
05	Spain	15	9	12	15	17	15	
06	Georgia							
07	Belarus	16	15	13	17	15	17	
08	Malta	6	17	17	13	6	11	
09	Wales	10	7	8	10	9	8	3
10	Kazakhstan	1	2	7	2	1	1	12
11	Poland	7	11	5	12	8	7	4
12	Ireland	12	8	11	16	11	12	
13	Ukraine	17	13	9	14	16	16	
14	Netherlands	14	6	2	6	13	6	5
15	Armenia	5	3	3	3	5	4	7
16	Portugal	11	16	16	9	12	13	
17	Italy	3	4	6	5	3	5	6
18	Albania	9	10	10	7	10	9	2
19	Serbia	8	14	15	8	7	10	1
