= Malta in the Junior Eurovision Song Contest 2019 =

- Junior Eurovision Song Contest 2019
- Country: Malta
- Selection process: Artist: Malta Junior Eurovision Song Contest 2019; Song: Internal Selection
- Selection date: Artist: 20 August 2019; Song: 12 October 2019

Competing entry
- Song: "We Are More"
- Artist: Eliana Gomez Blanco
- Songwriters: Jonas Thander; Rachel Suter; Kevin Lee; Joe Julian Farrugia

Placement
- Final result: 19th (last), 29 points

Participation chronology

Malta was represented at the Junior Eurovision Song Contest 2019 held in Gliwice, Poland. Their entrant was selected through a national selection, organised by the Maltese broadcaster Public Broadcasting Services (PBS) on 20 August 2019.

== Background ==
Prior to the 2019 Contest, Malta had participated in the Junior Eurovision Song Contest fourteen times since its first entry in 2003 only opting not to participate at the 2011 and 2012 contests. Malta has won on two occasions: in 2013 when Gaia Cauchi won with the song "The Start", and again in 2015 when Destiny Chukunyere came first with "Not My Soul" when it won the contest with 185 points, breaking the previous record held by Spain for the most points ever given to a winner. In the 2018 contest, Ela Mangion represented her country in Minsk, Belarus with the song "Marchin' On". She ended 5th out of 20 entries with 181 points.

== Before Junior Eurovision ==
=== Malta Junior Eurovision Song Contest 2019 ===
The winner was determined by a combination of jury voting and public televoting. For the public vote, voting commenced on 3 August 2019 and closed on 13 August 2019, and the winner was announced on 20 August 2019. The jury consisted of Claudia Faniello (singer, represented Malta in the Eurovision Song Contest 2017), Ela Mangion (singer, represented Malta in the Junior Eurovision Song Contest 2018) and Deo Grech (head of INFE Malta).

Final – 20 August 2019
Artist	Song (Original artist)	Place
Aiden Aquilina Cohen	"Loved Either Way" (Original song)	—
Amy Pace	"Rise Up" (Andra Day)	—
Eksensia Sammut	"Always Remember Us This Way" (Lady Gaga)	—
Eliana Gomez Blanco	"Sto male" (Ornella Vanoni)	1
Francesca Borg	"Seven Nation Army" (The White Stripes)	—
Kristy Spiteri	"Never Enough" (Loren Allred)	—
Leah Cauchi	"Illejla" (Original song)	2
Martina Cutajar	"Dynasty" (Miia)	3
Maya Cauchi	"Creep (Postmodern Jukebox)" (Radiohead)	—
Shania Cauchi	"O mio babbino caro" (Florence Easton)	—
Yarin Coleiro	"The Power of Love" (Frankie Goes to Hollywood)	—
Yulan Law	"Speechless" (Naomi Scott)	—

== Artist and song information ==
Eliana Gomez Blanco
- Born: 3 January 2005 (age 21); Malta
- Genres: Pop
- Occupation: Singer
- Instrument: Vocals
- Years active: 2011–present

(Malta) "We Are More"

Junior Eurovision Song Contest 2019 entry
- Country: Malta
- Artist: Eliana Gomez Blanco
- Languages: English, Maltese
- Composers: Jonas Thander, Rachel Suter
- Lyricists: Jonas Thander, Rachel Suter, Kevin Lee, Joe Julian Farrugia

Finals performance
- Final result: 19
- Final points: 29

Entry chronology
- ◄ "Marchin' On" (2018)
- "Chasing Sunsets" (2020) ►

=== Eliana Gomez Blanco ===
Eliana Gomez Blanco (born 3 January 2005) is a Maltese singer. She represented Malta at the Junior Eurovision Song Contest 2019 with the song "We Are More". On November 21, 2022, Malta announced the 40 artists of MESC 2023. Eliana Gomez Blanco was on the list with the song "Guess What". She received 20 points, placing eighth out of the 16 acts in the final. She also participated in MESC 2024 with the song "There's Only Flowers", however she did not qualify from the semi finals.

=== We Are More ===
"We Are More" is a song by Maltese singer Eliana Gomez Blanco. It represented Malta at the Junior Eurovision Song Contest 2019.

== At Junior Eurovision ==
During the opening ceremony and the running order draw which both took place on 18 November 2019, Malta was drawn to perform eighth on 24 November 2019, following Belarus and preceding Wales.

=== Voting ===
The same voting system that was introduced in the 2017 edition was used, where the results were determined by 50% online voting and 50% jury voting. Every participating broadcaster assembled a national jury that consisted of three music industry professionals and two children aged between 10 and 15 who were citizens of the country they represented. The rankings of those jurors were combined to make an overall top ten.

The online voting consisted of two phases. The first phase of the online voting began on 22 November 2019 when a recap of all the rehearsal performances was shown on the contest's website Junioreurovision.tv before the viewers could vote. After this, voters also had the option to watch longer one-minute clips from each participant's rehearsal. This first round of voting ended on 24 November at 15:59 CET. The second phase of the online voting took place during the live show and began right after the last performance and was open for 15 minutes. International viewers were able to vote for a minimum of three and a maximum of five songs. They were also able to vote for their own country's song. These votes were then turned into points which were determined by the percentage of votes received. For example, if a song received 10% of the votes, it received 10% of the available points.

Points awarded to Malta
Score	Country
12 points	
10 points	
8 points	
7 points	
6 points	
5 points	
4 points	
3 points	
2 points	
1 point	Serbia; Wales
Malta received 27 points from the online vote

Points awarded by Malta
Score	Country
12 points	North Macedonia
10 points	Poland
8 points	Australia
7 points	Kazakhstan
6 points	France
5 points	Netherlands
4 points	Spain
3 points	Belarus
2 points	Armenia
1 point	Georgia

==== Detailed voting results ====
Detailed voting results from Malta
Draw	Country	Juror A	Juror B	Juror C	Juror D	Juror E	Rank	Points
01	Australia	6	3	6	2	4	3	8
02	France	8	7	3	5	1	5	6
03	Russia	12	10	14	9	16	13	
04	North Macedonia	1	2	5	3	2	1	12
05	Spain	4	9	9	6	3	7	4
06	Georgia	14	8	10	7	18	10	1
07	Belarus	15	16	7	11	6	8	3
08	Malta							
09	Wales	17	17	11	12	15	17	
10	Kazakhstan	2	5	4	4	7	4	7
11	Poland	7	1	1	1	9	2	10
12	Ireland	13	11	8	14	11	12	
13	Ukraine	11	15	15	13	12	16	
14	Netherlands	3	4	2	10	5	6	5
15	Armenia	16	6	13	8	13	9	2
16	Portugal	18	18	18	18	14	18	
17	Italy	10	13	12	15	10	15	
18	Albania	5	12	16	16	17	11	
19	Serbia	9	14	17	17	8	14	
