= North Macedonia in the Junior Eurovision Song Contest 2019 =

- Junior Eurovision Song Contest 2019
- Country: North Macedonia
- Selection process: Internal selection
- Announcement date: Artist: 9 July 2019; Song: 15 October 2019

Competing entry
- Song: "Fire"
- Artist: Mila Moskov
- Songwriters: Lazar Cvetkoski; Magdalena Cvetkoska

Placement
- Final result: 6th, 150 points

Participation chronology

North Macedonia was represented at the Junior Eurovision Song Contest 2019 which took place on 24 November 2019 in Gliwice, Poland. The national broadcaster MRT was responsible for organising North Macedonia's entry for the contest. On 9 July 2019, Mila Moskov was internally selected as the Macedonian representative.

== Background ==
Prior to the 2018 contest, Macedonia had participated in the Junior Eurovision Song Contest thirteen times, under the provisional reference of "the former Yugoslav Republic of Macedonia", since its debut at the inaugural contest in 2003. Macedonia was absent twice from the Junior Eurovision Song Contest in 2012 and 2014 and has never won the contest. Its best result is the fifth place at the 2007 and 2008 contests, represented by the duo Rosica Kulakova and Dimitar Stojmenovski, and Bobi Andonov, respectively. In the 2018 contest, Marija Spasovska represented her country in Minsk, Belarus with the song "Doma". The song ended 12th out of 20 entries with 99 points.

== Before Junior Eurovision ==
On 9 July 2019, the national broadcaster revealed that they had chosen Mila Moskov internally to represent North Macedonia in the Junior Eurovision Song Contest 2019. Her song for the contest, "Fire", written by Lazar Cvetkoski and Magdalena Cvetkoska, was revealed on 15 October 2019.

== Artist and song information ==
Mila Moskov
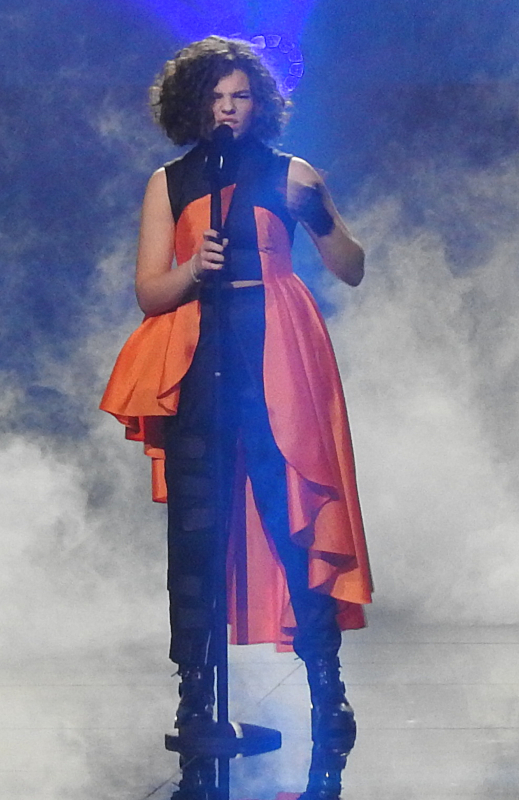

Background information
- Born: 8 March 2005 (age 20); Prilep, North Macedonia
- Genres: Pop
- Occupation: Singer
- Instruments: Vocals, Piano

(North Macedonia) "Fire"
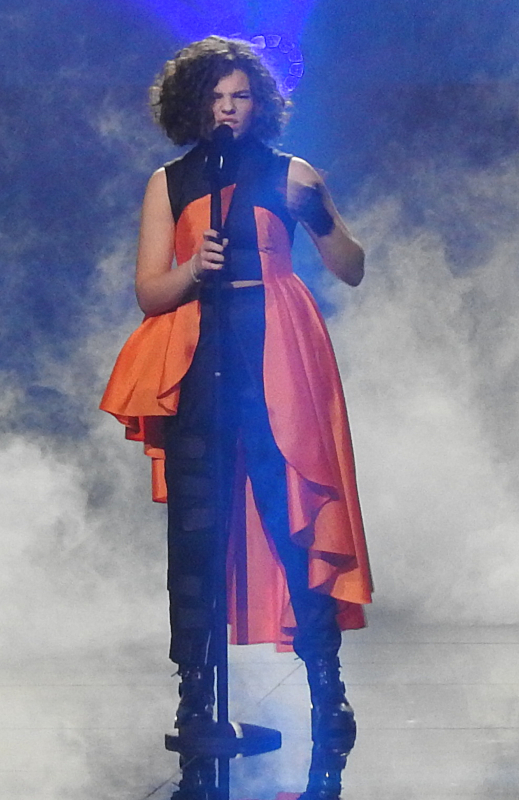

Junior Eurovision Song Contest 2019 entry
- Country: North Macedonia
- Artist(s): Mila Moskov
- Languages: Macedonian, English
- Composer(s): Lazar Cvetkoski
- Lyricist(s): Magdalena Cvetkoska

Finals performance
- Final result: 6th
- Final points: 150

Entry chronology
- ◄ "Doma" (2018)

=== Mila Moskov ===
Mila Moskov (born 8 March 2005) is a Macedonian singer. She represented North Macedonia at the Junior Eurovision Song Contest 2019 with the song "Fire". She started her music career when she was six years old. Her singing career began at her local music school where she learned to sing and play the piano.

=== Fire ===
"Fire" is a song by Macedonian child singer Mila Moskov. It represented North Macedonia at the Junior Eurovision Song Contest 2019.

== At Junior Eurovision ==
During the opening ceremony and the running order draw which both took place on 18 November 2019, North Macedonia was drawn to perform fourth on 24 November 2019, following Russia and preceding Spain.

=== Voting ===
The same voting system that was introduced in the 2017 edition was used, where the results were determined by 50% online voting and 50% jury voting. Every participating broadcaster assembled a national jury that consisted of three music industry professionals and two children aged between 10 and 15 who were citizens of the country they represented. The rankings of those jurors were combined to make an overall top ten.

The online voting consisted of two phases. The first phase of the online voting began on 22 November 2019 when a recap of all the rehearsal performances was shown on the contest's website Junioreurovision.tv before the viewers could vote. After this, voters also had the option to watch longer one-minute clips from each participant's rehearsal. This first round of voting ended on 24 November at 15:59 CET. The second phase of the online voting took place during the live show and began right after the last performance and was open for 15 minutes. International viewers were able vote for a minimum of three and a maximum of five songs. They were also able to vote for their own country's song. These votes were then turned into points which were determined by the percentage of votes received. For example, if a song received 10% of the votes, it received 10% of the available points.

Points awarded to North Macedonia
Score	Country
12 points	Malta
10 points	Georgia; Ireland; Portugal
8 points	
7 points	Albania; Netherlands; Poland; Russia; Ukraine
6 points	
5 points	Belarus
4 points	Australia; Italy
3 points	Armenia
2 points	Serbia; Spain; Wales
1 point	France
North Macedonia received 50 points from the online vote

Points awarded by North Macedonia
Score	Country
12 points	Serbia
10 points	Spain
8 points	Italy
7 points	Poland
6 points	Armenia
5 points	Kazakhstan
4 points	Netherlands
3 points	Georgia
2 points	Ireland
1 point	France

==== Detailed voting results ====
Detailed voting results from North Macedonia
Draw	Country	Juror A	Juror B	Juror C	Juror D	Juror E	Rank	Points
01	Australia	5	11	13	9	14	11	
02	France	9	5	17	16	6	10	1
03	Russia	15	17	16	14	10	16	
04	North Macedonia							
05	Spain	3	6	2	6	5	2	10
06	Georgia	10	3	8	5	12	8	3
07	Belarus	11	13	18	15	13	15	
08	Malta	16	16	15	13	18	17	
09	Wales	14	12	7	11	16	14	
10	Kazakhstan	2	10	5	12	4	6	5
11	Poland	6	1	9	4	11	4	7
12	Ireland	12	9	11	3	15	9	2
13	Ukraine	13	14	12	7	9	13	
14	Netherlands	17	8	3	2	7	7	4
15	Armenia	4	7	6	10	2	5	6
16	Portugal	18	18	14	17	17	18	
17	Italy	8	4	4	8	3	3	8
18	Albania	7	15	10	18	8	12	
19	Serbia	1	2	1	1	1	1	12
