= Poland in the Junior Eurovision Song Contest 2019 =

- Junior Eurovision Song Contest 2019
- Participating broadcaster: Telewizja Polska (TVP)
- Country: Poland
- Selection process: Szansa na sukces
- Selection date: 29 September 2019

Competing entry
- Song: "Superhero"
- Artist: Viki Gabor
- Songwriters: Małgorzata Uściłowska; Patryk Kumór; Dominic Buczkowski-Wojtaszek

Placement
- Final result: 1st, 278 points

Participation chronology

Poland was represented at the Junior Eurovision Song Contest 2019 with the song "Superhero", written by Małgorzata Uściłowska, Patryk Kumór, and Dominic Buczkowski-Wojtaszek, and performed by Viki Gabor. The Polish participating broadcaster, Telewizja Polska (TVP), selected its entry through Szansa na sukces. The song won the contest with 278 points. In addition, TVP was also the host broadcaster and staged the event at the Gliwice Arena in Gliwice.

== Background ==
Prior to the 2019 contest, Telewizja Polska (TVP) had participated in the Junior Eurovision Song Contest representing Poland five times: In 2003 and 2004, its entries finished in last place, and TVP decided not to participate from 2005 to 2015. The broadcaster returned successfully in 2016. Olivia Wieczorek was selected to represent the nation that year with the song "Nie zapomnij". Olivia finished in 11th place out of 17 entries with 60 points. In 2017, Alicja Rega was selected to represent Poland with the song "Mój dom". She finished 8th out of 16 entries with 138 points. Roksana Węgiel won the 2018 contest, and therefore TVP were given the right to host the 2019 contest.

== Before Junior Eurovision ==
=== Szansa na sukces ===
Szansa na sukces (transl. Chance of Success) is a competition organised by TVP that selected the artist and song representing Poland in the contest. It consisted of three pre-recorded semi-finals broadcast on 8, 15 and 22 September 2019, each lasting 65 minutes, and a final held on 29 September 2019. All shows were broadcast on TVP2.

Auditions for the competition were held on 13 and 14 July 2019 at the TVP headquarters in Warsaw. Approximately 1000 people auditioned.

==== Semi-final 1 ====
The first semi-final was broadcast on 8 September 2019 at 15:15. All seven semi-finalists performed songs from Majka Jeżowska's discography. The following seven artists competed in this semi-final. The contestant in highlighted gold qualified for the season finale, while two other contestants highlighted in blue were the honourable mentions:

Semi-final 1 – 8 September 2019
R/O	Artist	Song	Result
1	Swietłana Boguska	"Laleczka z saskiej porcelany"	Eliminated
2	Nikola Fiedor	"Od rana mam dobry humor"	Finalist
3	Piotr Klima	"A ja wolę moją mamę"	Eliminated
4	Zofia "Zosia" Szuca	"Najpiękniejsza w klasie"	Honourable mention
5	Amelia Kurantowicz	"Margarita"	Eliminated
6	Maja Mazurek	"Wszystkie dzieci nasze są"	Honourable mention
7	Maciej Golian	"Na raz, na dwa"	Eliminated

==== Semi-final 2 ====
The second semi-final was broadcast on 15 September 2019 at 15:15. All seven semi-finalists performed covers of songs by Blue Café, who represented Poland at the Eurovision Song Contest 2004 in Istanbul, Turkey. The following seven artists competed in this semi-final. The contestant highlighted in gold qualified for the season finale, while two other contestants highlighted in blue were the honourable mentions:

Semi-final 2 – 15 September 2019
R/O	Artist	Song	Result
1	Maksymilian "Maks" Wysocki	"Buena"	Eliminated
2	Marianna Józefina Piątkowska	"Do nieba"	Honourable mention
3	Wiktoria "Viki" Gabor	"You May Be in Love"	Finalist
4	Oliwia "Oliwka" Kopiec	"To ty"	Honourable mention
5	Krzysztof Kwaśny	"Czas nie będzie czekał"	Eliminated
6	Oliwia Stefanowska	"Zapamiętaj"	Eliminated
7	Zuzanna "Zuzia" Janik	"Kochamy siebie"	Eliminated

==== Semi-final 3 ====
The third semi-final was broadcast on 22 September 2019 at 15:15. All seven semi-finalists performed covers of songs by Papa D. The contestant highlighted in gold qualified for the season finale, while two other contestants highlighted in blue were honourable mentions. The following seven artists competed in this semi-final:

Semi-final 3 – 22 September 2019
R/O	Artist	Song	Result
1	Karolina Bajer	"Maxi singiel"	Eliminated
2	Adam Bartkiewicz	"Nasz Disneyland"	Eliminated
3	Anna "Ania" Chwałczyńska	"Ocean wspomnień"	Honourable mention
4	Eryk Waszczuk	"O-la-la"	Honourable mention
5	Gabriela Katzer	"Panorama Tatr"	Finalist
6	Natasza Sieradzka	"Pocztówka z wakacji"	Eliminated
7	Zofia "Zosia" Kwaśna	"Naj – story"	Eliminated

==== Final ====
The final was held on 29 September 2019 at 15:15. Three finalists competed, and the winner was determined by a combination of jury voting and televoting. Each finalist performed two songs: one song by an artist which was a guest of the semi-final she qualified from, and one original song to be their candidate entry in hopes of representing Poland at Junior Eurovision on home soil. The show was broadcast in two parts: the first was pre-recorded and featured the competing artists and songs, and the second was broadcast live and revealed the voting results.

Final – 29 September 2019
Artist	R/O	Cover	R/O	JESC song	Jury	Televote	Total	Place
Nikola Fiedor	1	"A Ja Wolę Moją Mamę" (Majka Jeżowska)	6	"Bubbles in My Head"	3	3	6	2
Wiktoria "Viki" Gabor	2	"Zapamiętaj" (Blue Café)	5	"Superhero"	5	5	10	1
Gabriela Katzer	3	"Maxi Singiel" (Papa D)	4	"On My Way"	1	1	2	3

== At Junior Eurovision ==
During the opening ceremony and the running order draw which both took place on 18 November 2019, Poland was drawn to perform eleventh on 24 November 2019, following Kazakhstan and preceding Ireland.

=== Voting ===
The same voting system that was introduced in the 2017 edition was used, where the results were determined by 50% online voting and 50% jury voting. Every participating broadcaster assembled a national jury that consisted of three music industry professionals and two children aged between 10 and 15 who were citizens of the country they represented. The rankings of those jurors were combined to make an overall top ten.

The online voting consisted of two phases. The first phase of the online voting began on 22 November 2019 when a recap of all the rehearsal performances was shown on the contest's website Junioreurovision.tv before the viewers could vote. After this, voters also had the option to watch longer one-minute clips from each participant's rehearsal. This first round of voting ended on 24 November at 15:59 CET. The second phase of the online voting took place during the live show and began right after the last performance and was open for 15 minutes. International viewers were able to vote for a minimum of three and a maximum of five songs. They were also able to vote for their own country's song. These votes were then turned into points which were determined by the percentage of votes received. For example, if a song received 10% of the votes, it received 10% of the available points.

Points awarded to Poland
Score	Country
12 points	Kazakhstan; Spain
10 points	Belarus; France; Malta; Serbia
8 points	Netherlands; Ukraine
7 points	North Macedonia
6 points	Wales
5 points	Portugal
4 points	Georgia; Ireland
3 points	Italy
2 points	Albania
1 point	Russia
Poland received 166 points from the online vote

Points awarded by Poland
Score	Country
12 points	Kazakhstan
10 points	Australia
8 points	Spain
7 points	North Macedonia
6 points	Netherlands
5 points	Georgia
4 points	Italy
3 points	Armenia
2 points	Belarus
1 point	France

==== Detailed voting results ====
The following members comprised the Polish jury:

- AniKa Dąbrowska
- Kasia Moś – represented Poland in the Eurovision Song Contest 2017
- Mateusz Moś
- Paweł Szymański
- Piotr Kupicha

Detailed voting results from Poland
Draw	Country	Juror A	Juror B	Juror C	Juror D	Juror E	Rank	Points
01	Australia	2	3	2	3	1	2	10
02	France	13	10	8	7	6	10	1
03	Russia	14	13	13	16	7	16	
04	North Macedonia	3	7	6	5	5	4	7
05	Spain	11	9	4	2	3	3	8
06	Georgia	4	2	11	9	18	6	5
07	Belarus	9	4	9	15	9	9	2
08	Malta	8	8	15	12	16	13	
09	Wales	16	17	14	17	15	17	
10	Kazakhstan	1	1	3	1	4	1	12
11	Poland							
12	Ireland	12	12	7	14	10	12	
13	Ukraine	10	11	16	4	11	11	
14	Netherlands	5	6	12	13	2	5	6
15	Armenia	17	15	1	6	14	8	3
16	Portugal	18	18	18	18	17	18	
17	Italy	6	5	5	8	12	7	4
18	Albania	7	16	17	10	13	15	
19	Serbia	15	14	10	11	8	14	
