= Russia in the Junior Eurovision Song Contest 2019 =

- Junior Eurovision Song Contest 2019
- Country: Russia
- Selection process: Akademiya Eurovision 2019
- Selection date: 24 September 2019

Competing entry
- Song: "A Time For Us"
- Artist: Tatyana Mezhentseva and Denberel Oorzhak
- Songwriters: Dmitry Northman

Placement
- Final result: 13th, 72 points

Participation chronology

Russia was represented at the Junior Eurovision Song Contest 2019 which took place on 24 November 2019 in Gliwice, Poland. The Russian broadcaster All-Russia State Television and Radio Broadcasting Company (VGTRK) was responsible for organising their entry for the contest. Tatyana Mezhentseva and Denberel Oorzhak won the national final on 24 September 2019 with the song "Vremya dlya nas". The Russian organisation team later opted to change the name of the song to "A Time for Us".

== Background ==
Prior to the 2019 Contest, Russia had participated in the Junior Eurovision Song Contest fourteen times since its debut in 2005. Russia have participated at every contest since its debut, and have won the contest two times in 2006 with the song "Vesenniy Jazz", performed by Tolmachevy Twins. The twin sisters went on to become the first act from a Junior Eurovision Song Contest to represent their country at the Eurovision Song Contest, performing the song "Shine" at the Eurovision Song Contest 2014, in Copenhagen, Denmark. and in 2017, Polina Bogusevich with the song "Wings".Anna Filipchuk represented her country in Minsk, Belarus with the song "Unbreakable".She ended 10th out of 20 entries with 122 points.

== Before Junior Eurovision ==
=== Akademiya Eurovision 2019 ===
The Russian broadcaster, VGTRK, announced on 4 December 2018 that they would be participating at the 2019 Contest. Submissions for entrants were open between 18 December to 20 March, with the audition stage taking place in the Russian capital, Moscow, in April 2019. VGTRK announced on 16 September that a total of eleven artists would be competing in the national final. The national selection of the entrant for Russia at the Junior Eurovision Song Contest 2019, took place at the Crocus City Hall in Moscow on 24 September 2019, and was televised a day later on 25 September. The winner was determined by a voting split of jury members and internet voting which opened on 17 September and closed on 23 September. Tatyana Mezhentseva and Denberel Oorzhak won the national final with the song "Vremya dlya nas".

Draw	Artist	Song	Jury		Online vote	Total	Place
Draw	Artist	Song	Adult	Kids	Online vote	Total	Place
1	Ksenia Kushner	"Devushki ne plachut" (Девушки не плачут)	50	42	86	178	7
2	Tatyana Mezhentseva & Denberel Oorzhak	"Vremya dlya nas" (Время для нас)	50	52	839	941	1
3	Nikita Moroz	"Nikita and Friends"	41	29	195	265	3
4	Margarita Stryukova	"V moyem nebe" (В моем небе)	52	40	155	247	5
5	Mikhail Noginsky	"Supergeroy" (Супергерой)	39	42	139	220	6
6	Maryana Titova	"My legendy" (Мы легенды)	35	28	190	253	4
7	Like Teens	"Papenkiny dochki" (Папенькины дочки)	46	32	22	100	11
8	Yulia Solnyshkova	"Yarkiy svet" (Яркий свет)	42	19	56	117	10
9	Alisa Pritochkina	"Vybiray lyubov" (Выбирай любовь)	37	25	103	165	8
10	Maria Mirova	"Put k mechte" (Путь к мечте)	50	52	29	131	9
11	Daniil Khachaturov	"Zhizn" (Жизнь)	42	42	770	859	2

== Artist and song information ==
Tatyana Mezhentseva
- Born: Tatyana Mezhentseva; 14 December 2009 (age 16); Moscow, Russia
- Occupation: Singer
- Instrument: Vocals

Denberel Oorzhak
- Born: Denberel Oorzhak; 3 June 2006 (age 20); Kyzyl, Russia
- Occupation: Singer
- Instrument: Vocals

(Russia) "A Time for Us"
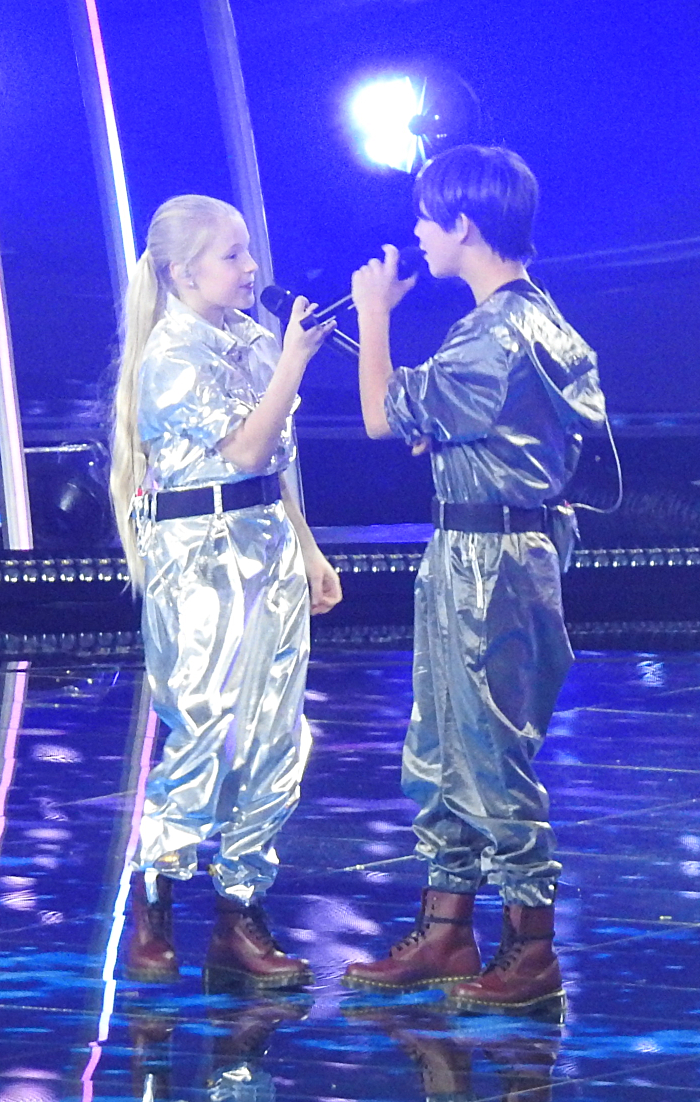

Junior Eurovision Song Contest 2019 entry
- Country: Russia
- Languages: Russian, English
- Composer: Dmitry Northman
- Lyricist: Dmitry Northman

Finals performance
- Final result: 13th
- Final points: 72

Entry chronology
- ◄ "Unbreakable" (2018)
- "Moy novy den (My New Day)" (2020) ►

=== Tatyana Mezhentseva and Denberel Oorzhak ===
Tatyana Mezhentseva (Russian: Татьяна Меженцева, born 14 December 2009) and Denberel Oorzhak (Russian: Денберел Ооржак, born 3 June 2006) are Russian child singers. They represented Russia at the Junior Eurovision Song Contest 2019 with the song "A Time for Us". Mezhentseva will go on and represent her country again in the Junior Eurovision Song Contest 2021 in Paris with the song "Mon Ami".

=== A Time for Us ===
"A Time for Us" is a song by Russian singers Tatyana Mezhentseva and Denberel Oorzhak. It represented Russia at the Junior Eurovision Song Contest 2019.

== At Junior Eurovision ==
During the opening ceremony and the running order draw which both took place on 18 November 2019, Russia was drawn to perform third on 24 November 2019, following France and preceding North Macedonia.

=== Voting ===
The same voting system that was introduced in the 2017 edition was used, where the results were determined by 50% online voting and 50% jury voting. Every participating broadcaster assembled a national jury that consisted of three music industry professionals and two children aged between 10 and 15 who were citizens of the country they represented. The rankings of those jurors were combined to make an overall top ten.

The online voting consisted of two phases. The first phase of the online voting began on 22 November 2019 when a recap of all the rehearsal performances was shown on the contest's website Junioreurovision.tv before the viewers could vote. After this, voters also had the option to watch longer one-minute clips from each participant's rehearsal. This first round of voting ended on 24 November at 15:59 CET. The second phase of the online voting took place during the live show and began right after the last performance and was open for 15 minutes. International viewers were able to vote for a minimum of three and a maximum of five songs. They were also able to vote for their own country's song. These votes were then turned into points which were determined by the percentage of votes received. For example, if a song received 10% of the votes, it received 10% of the available points.

Points awarded to Russia
Score	Country
12 points	
10 points	Armenia
8 points	
7 points	
6 points	
5 points	
4 points	
3 points	Kazakhstan
2 points	Portugal
1 point	
Russia received 57 points from the online vote

Points awarded by Russia
Score	Country
12 points	Australia
10 points	Armenia
8 points	Kazakhstan
7 points	North Macedonia
6 points	Ireland
5 points	Albania
4 points	Netherlands
3 points	Serbia
2 points	Italy
1 point	Poland

==== Detailed voting results ====
Detailed voting results from Russia
Draw	Country	Juror A	Juror B	Juror C	Juror D	Juror E	Rank	Points
01	Australia	2	2	2	1	1	1	12
02	France	6	10	15	18	9	14	
03	Russia							
04	North Macedonia	4	8	5	11	4	4	7
05	Spain	3	16	10	17	17	12	
06	Georgia	8	9	8	15	12	13	
07	Belarus	9	18	18	7	14	15	
08	Malta	12	11	9	16	15	17	
09	Wales	11	3	7	14	18	11	
10	Kazakhstan	1	13	14	2	2	3	8
11	Poland	5	6	13	13	8	10	1
12	Ireland	10	14	4	3	11	5	6
13	Ukraine	13	12	12	12	10	16	
14	Netherlands	14	4	16	4	7	7	4
15	Armenia	7	1	6	5	3	2	10
16	Portugal	15	15	17	9	16	18	
17	Italy	18	7	3	8	13	9	2
18	Albania	17	17	1	10	6	6	5
19	Serbia	16	5	11	6	5	8	3
