= Australia in the Junior Eurovision Song Contest 2019 =

- Junior Eurovision Song Contest 2019
- Participating broadcaster: Australian Broadcasting Corporation (ABC)
- Country: Australia
- Selection process: Internal selection
- Announcement date: Artist: 1 September 2019; Song: 7 October 2019

Competing entry
- Song: "We Will Rise"
- Artist: Jordan Anthony
- Songwriters: Jordan Anthony, MSquared

Placement
- Final result: 8th, 121 points

Participation chronology

Australia was represented at the Junior Eurovision Song Contest 2019 which was held in Gliwice, Poland. The Australian broadcaster ABC was responsible for choosing their entry for the contest. Jordan Anthony was internally selected to represent Australia in Poland.

== Background ==
Prior to the 2019 Contest, Australia had participated in the Junior Eurovision Song Contest since 2015. On 1 September 2019, it was announced that Jordan Anthony had been internally chosen by the broadcaster to represent Australia. Rabbone (born 16 December 2004) had previously, at the age of 14, auditioned for the eighth season of The Voice Australia, where he was mentored by Delta Goodrem and finished in fourth place. His song for the Junior Eurovision Song Contest 2019 was "We Will Rise". He is of Polish descent – two of his grandparents originate from Zawiercie.

== At Junior Eurovision ==
During the opening ceremony and the running order draw which both took place on 18 November 2019, Australia was drawn to perform first on 24 November 2019, preceding France.

=== Voting ===
The same voting system that was introduced in the 2017 edition was used, where the results were determined by 50% online voting and 50% jury voting. Every participating broadcaster assembled a national jury that consisted of three music industry professionals and two children aged between 10 and 15 who were citizens of the country they represented. The rankings of those jurors were combined to make an overall top ten.

The online voting consisted of two phases. The first phase of the online voting began on 22 November 2019 when a recap of all the rehearsal performances was shown on the contest's website Junioreurovision.tv before the viewers could vote. After this, voters also had the option to watch longer one-minute clips from each participant's rehearsal. This first round of voting ended on 24 November at 15:59 CET. The second phase of the online voting took place during the live show and began right after the last performance and was open for 15 minutes. International viewers were able vote for a minimum of three and a maximum of five songs. They were also able to vote for their own country's song. These votes were then turned into points which were determined by the percentage of votes received. For example, if a song received 10% of the votes, it received 10% of the available points.

Points awarded to Australia
Score	Country
12 points	Russia
10 points	Poland; Ukraine
8 points	Georgia; Kazakhstan; Malta
7 points	Serbia
6 points	Netherlands
5 points	Armenia
4 points	Belarus
3 points	
2 points	Italy
1 point	Ireland; Spain
Australia received 39 points from the online vote

Points awarded by Australia
Score	Country
12 points	Netherlands
10 points	France
8 points	Armenia
7 points	Kazakhstan
6 points	Belarus
5 points	Georgia
4 points	North Macedonia
3 points	Ukraine
2 points	Italy
1 point	Spain

==== Detailed voting results ====
The following members comprised the Australian jury:

- Christine Collyer
- Jess Hitchcock
- Paul Waxman
- Jael Wena – represented Australia in the Junior Eurovision Song Contest 2018
- Dylan Marguccio

Detailed voting results from Australia
Draw	Country	Juror A	Juror B	Juror C	Juror D	Juror E	Rank	Points
01	Australia							
02	France	4	3	4	3	12	2	10
03	Russia	12	17	16	16	10	15	
04	North Macedonia	13	4	6	7	4	7	4
05	Spain	7	10	5	5	15	10	1
06	Georgia	10	13	18	1	3	6	5
07	Belarus	2	11	3	13	8	5	6
08	Malta	14	18	12	17	9	14	
09	Wales	11	8	17	8	5	13	
10	Kazakhstan	5	2	9	4	11	4	7
11	Poland	15	12	2	9	13	12	
12	Ireland	16	16	13	12	16	16	
13	Ukraine	3	7	10	6	17	8	3
14	Netherlands	1	9	1	2	1	1	12
15	Armenia	8	1	8	11	2	3	8
16	Portugal	18	15	14	18	18	18	
17	Italy	9	5	7	10	7	9	2
18	Albania	17	14	15	14	14	17	
19	Serbia	6	6	11	15	6	11	
