= Serbia in the Junior Eurovision Song Contest 2019 =

- Junior Eurovision Song Contest 2019
- Country: Serbia
- Selection process: Internal selection
- Announcement date: 16 September 2019

Competing entry
- Song: "Podigni glas (Raise Your Voice)"
- Artist: Darija Vračević
- Songwriters: Aleksandra Milutinović; Leontina Vukomanović; Darija Vračević; Aleksandar Sablić

Placement
- Final result: 10th, 109 points

Participation chronology

Serbia was represented at the Junior Eurovision Song Contest 2019 in Gliwice, Poland with the song "Podigni glas (Raise Your Voice)" performed by Darija Vračević. Radio Television of Serbia (RTS) was responsible for selecting their entry for the contest.

== Background ==
Prior to the 2019 Contest, Serbia had participated in the Junior Eurovision Song Contest ten times since its debut in 2006, and once as Serbia and Montenegro in 2005, prior to the Montenegrin independence referendum in 2006 which culminated into the dissolution of Serbia and Montenegro, As of 2019, Serbia's best results are two third places, achieved in 2007 and 2010. In last year's contest Serbia got a nineteenth place with Bojana Radovanović and a song called "Svet".

== Before Junior Eurovision ==
On 16 September 2019, RTS announced that Darija Vračević would represent Serbia in the contest with the song "Podigni glas (Raise Your Voice)". Vračević was chosen following a two-stage internal selection process, with the second stage consisting of two shortlisted acts performing their songs in front of a jury consisting of RTS music editors, namely Silvana Grujić, Anja Rogljić, Uroš Marković, Jelena Vlahović, Dušan Šukletović, Jovana Dukić and Tamara Petković, at the Studio 6 of Radio Belgrade. The other shortlisted song was "Da, da, da" performed by Staša Kostadinović.

== Artist and song information ==
Darija Vračević
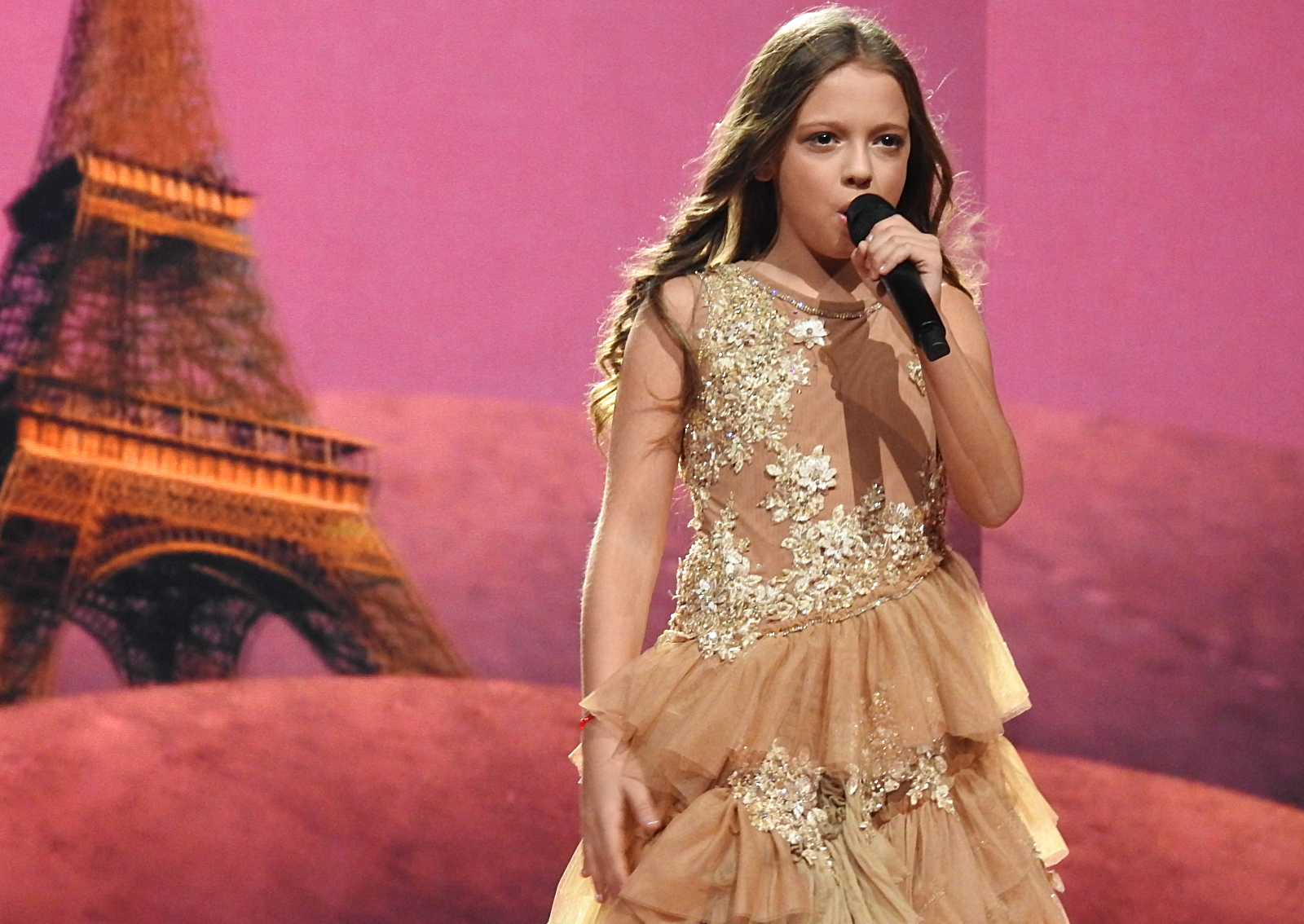

Background information
- Born: 27 October 2007 (age 18); Belgrade, Serbia
- Origin: Belgrade, Serbia
- Occupation(s): Singer, voice actress
- Instrument: Vocals

(Serbia) "Podigni glas (Raise Your Voice)"
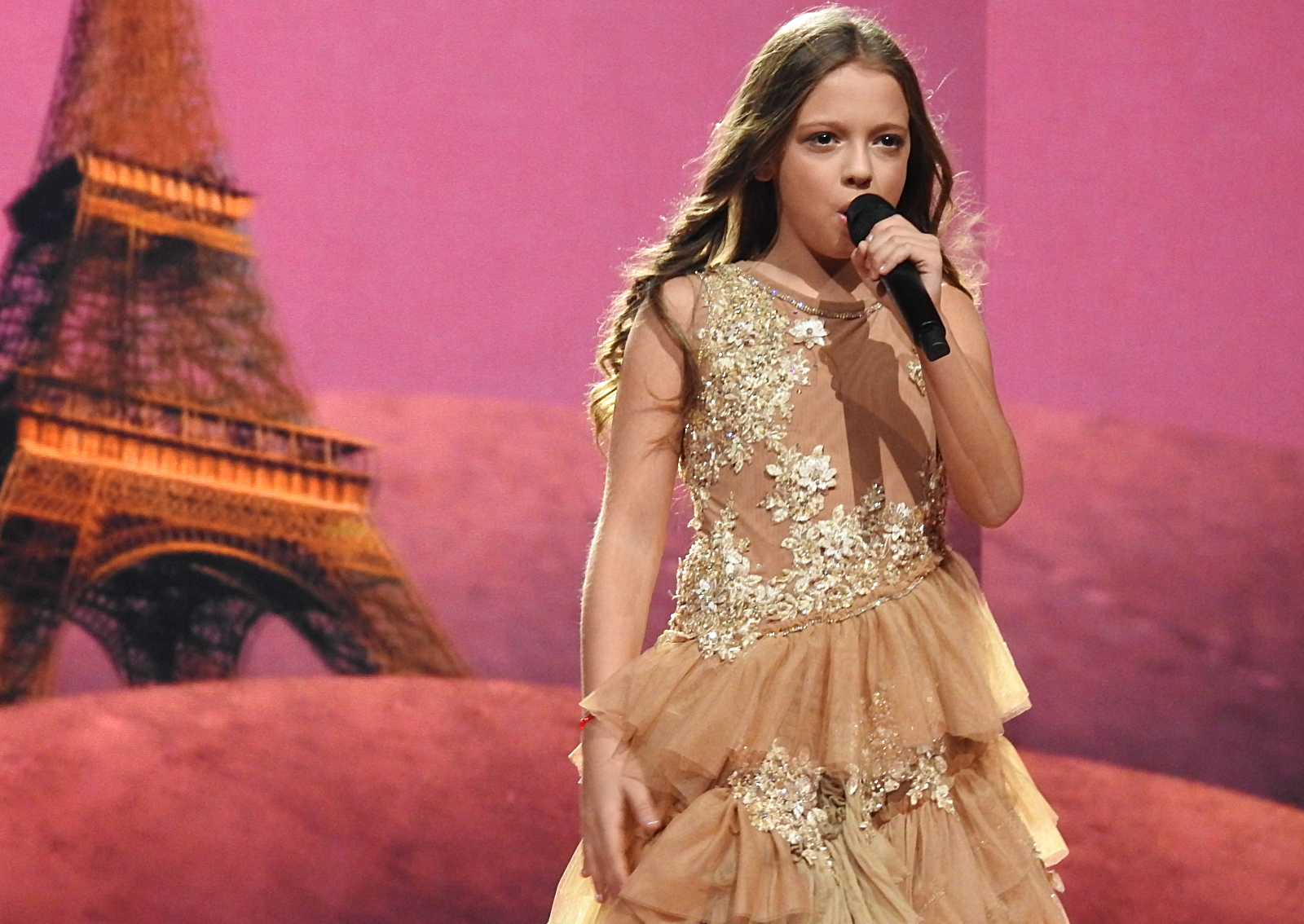

Junior Eurovision Song Contest 2019 entry
- Country: Serbia
- Artist: Darija Vračević
- Languages: Serbian; English
- Composers: Aleksandra Milutinović; Leontina Vukomanović; Darija Vračević; Aleksandar Sablić
- Lyricists: Aleksandra Milutinović; Leontina Vukomanović; Darija Vračević; Aleksandar Sablić

Finals performance
- Final result: 10
- Final points: 109

Entry chronology
- ◄ "Svet" (2018)
- "Heartbeat" (2020) ►

=== Darija Vračević ===
Darija Vračević (Serbian: Дарија Врачевић, born 27 October 2007) is a Serbian singer, actress and voice artist born in Belgrade. She participated in Pinkove Zvezdice in 2018–19, and represented Serbia at the Junior Eurovision Song Contest 2019 with the song "Podigni glas".

=== Podigni glas (Raise Your Voice) ===
"Podigni glas" (Serbian: Подигни глас; lit. Raise your voice) is a song by Serbian singer Darija Vračević. It represented Serbia at the Junior Eurovision Song Contest 2019.

== At Junior Eurovision ==
During the opening ceremony and the running order draw which both took place on 18 November 2019, Serbia was drawn to perform nineteenth (last) on 24 November 2019, following Albania.

=== Voting ===
The same voting system that was introduced in the 2017 edition was used, where the results were determined by 50% online voting and 50% jury voting. Every participating broadcaster assembled a national jury that consisted of three music industry professionals and two children aged between 10 and 15 who were citizens of the country they represented. The rankings of those jurors were combined to make an overall top ten.

The online voting consisted of two phases. The first phase of the online voting began on 22 November 2019 when a recap of all the rehearsal performances was shown on the contest's website Junioreurovision.tv before the viewers could vote. After this, voters also had the option to watch longer one-minute clips from each participant's rehearsal. This first round of voting ended on 24 November at 15:59 CET. The second phase of the online voting took place during the live show and began right after the last performance and was open for 15 minutes. International viewers were able to vote for a minimum of three and a maximum of five songs. They were also able to vote for their own country's song. These votes were then turned into points which were determined by the percentage of votes received. For example, if a song received 10% of the votes, it received 10% of the available points.

Points awarded to Serbia
Score	Country
12 points	North Macedonia
10 points	
8 points	
7 points	
6 points	France
5 points	
4 points	Albania; Kazakhstan; Spain; Wales
3 points	Ireland; Netherlands; Russia
2 points	
1 point	Belarus; Georgia; Ukraine
Serbia received 63 points from the online vote

Points awarded by Serbia
Score	Country
12 points	Kazakhstan
10 points	Poland
8 points	France
7 points	Australia
6 points	Italy
5 points	Spain
4 points	Georgia
3 points	Ukraine
2 points	North Macedonia
1 point	Malta

==== Detailed voting results ====
Detailed voting results from Serbia
Draw	Country	Juror A	Juror B	Juror C	Juror D	Juror E	Rank	Points
01	Australia	4	5	6	8	4	4	7
02	France	3	3	3	2	3	3	8
03	Russia	11	9	9	17	8	12	
04	North Macedonia	18	8	17	3	18	9	2
05	Spain	9	6	7	5	5	6	5
06	Georgia	16	12	5	6	7	7	4
07	Belarus	17	11	12	18	12	15	
08	Malta	5	17	11	7	14	10	1
09	Wales	10	15	13	9	11	13	
10	Kazakhstan	1	1	1	4	1	1	12
11	Poland	2	2	4	1	2	2	10
12	Ireland	15	13	14	10	16	14	
13	Ukraine	6	7	8	12	10	8	3
14	Netherlands	12	14	15	16	13	16	
15	Armenia	8	10	10	13	9	11	
16	Portugal	14	18	16	14	15	18	
17	Italy	7	4	2	15	6	5	6
18	Albania	13	16	18	11	17	17	
19	Serbia							
