= Italy in the Junior Eurovision Song Contest 2019 =

- Junior Eurovision Song Contest 2019
- Country: Italy
- Selection process: Internal Selection
- Selection date: 9 October 2019

Competing entry
- Song: "La voce della terra"
- Artist: Marta Viola
- Songwriters: Marco Iardella, Franco Fasano, Emilio di Stefano, Fabrizio Palaferri

Placement
- Final result: 7th, 129 points

Participation chronology

Italy was represented at the Junior Eurovision Song Contest 2019 which took place on 24 November 2019 in Gliwice, Poland. The Italian broadcaster Rai Gulp, which is a channel owned by Radiotelevisione Italiana (RAI), was responsible for organising their entry for the contest. Marta Viola was internally selected to represent Italy with the song "La voce della terra".

== Background ==
Prior to the 2019 Contest, Italy had participated in the Junior Eurovision Song Contest five times since its debut in 2014, having won the contest on their first appearance with the song "Tu primo grande amore", performed by Vincenzo Cantiello.

== Before Junior Eurovision ==
The Italian broadcaster announced on 26 June 2018, that they would be participating at the contest which takes place on 24 November 2019, in Gliwice, Poland. The method for selecting their entrant and song was done internally by the national broadcaster, RAI. On 9 October 2019, it was announced that Marta Viola would be representing Italy at the contest with the song "La voce della terra".

== At Junior Eurovision ==
During the opening ceremony and the running order draw which both took place on 18 November 2019, Italy was drawn to perform seventeenth on 24 November 2019, following Portugal and preceding Albania.

=== Voting ===
The same voting system that was introduced in the 2017 edition was used, where the results were determined by 50% online voting and 50% jury voting. Every participating broadcaster assembled a national jury that consisted of three music industry professionals and two children aged between 10 and 15 who were citizens of the country they represented. The rankings of those jurors were combined to make an overall top ten.

The online voting consisted of two phases. The first phase of the online voting began on 22 November 2019 when a recap of all the rehearsal performances was shown on the contest's website Junioreurovision.tv before the viewers could vote. After this, voters also had the option to watch longer one-minute clips from each participant's rehearsal. This first round of voting ended on 24 November at 15:59 CET. The second phase of the online voting took place during the live show and began right after the last performance and was open for 15 minutes. International viewers were able vote for a minimum of three and a maximum of five songs. They were also able to vote for their own country's song. These votes were then turned into points which were determined by the percentage of votes received. For example, if a song received 10% of the votes, it received 10% of the available points.

Points awarded to Italy
Score	Country
12 points	Ireland
10 points	
8 points	North Macedonia
7 points	France
6 points	Georgia; Serbia
5 points	Ukraine
4 points	Netherlands; Poland
3 points	Wales
2 points	Armenia; Australia; Belarus; Russia
1 point	Kazakhstan; Portugal
Italy received 64 points from the online vote

Points awarded by Italy
Score	Country
12 points	Spain
10 points	Belarus
8 points	France
7 points	Kazakhstan
6 points	Wales
5 points	Netherlands
4 points	North Macedonia
3 points	Poland
2 points	Australia
1 point	Ireland

==== Detailed voting results ====
The following members comprised the Italian jury:

- Alessandro Pigliavento (jury chairperson) – blogger, founder of Eurofestival News
- Cristina Insalaco – journalist for La Stampa
- Laura Galigani – Professor at the Turin Musical Academy

Detailed voting results from Italy
Draw	Country	Juror A	Juror B	Juror C	Juror D	Juror E	Rank	Points
01	Australia	10	2	10	18	7	9	2
02	France	2	6	13	10	1	3	8
03	Russia	17	15	15	13	16	18	
04	North Macedonia	14	7	4	1	14	7	4
05	Spain	4	1	5	2	5	1	12
06	Georgia	18	16	18	11	15	17	
07	Belarus	6	8	1	3	6	2	10
08	Malta	13	4	8	16	13	11	
09	Wales	3	3	14	17	2	5	6
10	Kazakhstan	7	9	3	4	4	4	7
11	Poland	11	12	2	5	9	8	3
12	Ireland	5	5	9	14	10	10	1
13	Ukraine	15	14	7	6	12	12	
14	Netherlands	1	10	6	15	3	6	5
15	Armenia	8	11	12	12	11	14	
16	Portugal	9	17	17	7	18	15	
17	Italy							
18	Albania	16	18	16	8	17	16	
19	Serbia	12	13	11	9	8	13	
