= Portugal in the Junior Eurovision Song Contest 2019 =

- Junior Eurovision Song Contest 2019
- Country: Portugal
- Selection process: Internal selection
- Announcement date: 26 September 2019

Competing entry
- Song: "Vem comigo (Come With Me)"
- Artist: Joana Almeida
- Songwriters: João Pedro Coimbra

Placement
- Final result: 16th, 43 points

Participation chronology

Portugal represented the Junior Eurovision Song Contest 2019 which took place on 24 November 2019 in Gliwice, Poland. The Portuguese broadcaster Radio and Television of Portugal (RTP) was responsible for organising their entry for the contest. Joana Almeida was internally selected on 26 September 2019 as the Portuguese representative.

== Background ==
The participation of Portugal in the Junior Eurovision Song Contest first began at the 2006 contest which took place in Bucharest, Romania. Rádio e Televisão de Portugal (RTP), a member of the European Broadcasting Union (EBU), was responsible for the selection process of participants. Portugal used a national selection format to select contestants, broadcasting a show entitled "Festival da Canção Junior". This was a junior version of Festival da Canção, the national music competition organized by broadcaster RTP to choose the Portuguese entry for the Eurovision Song Contest. The first representative to participate for the nation at the 2006 contest was Pedro Madeira with the song "Deixa-me sentir", which finished in second-last place out of fifteen participating entries, achieving a score of twenty-two points. Portugal withdrew from competing in 2008, and returned in 2017.

== Artist and song information ==
Joana Almeida
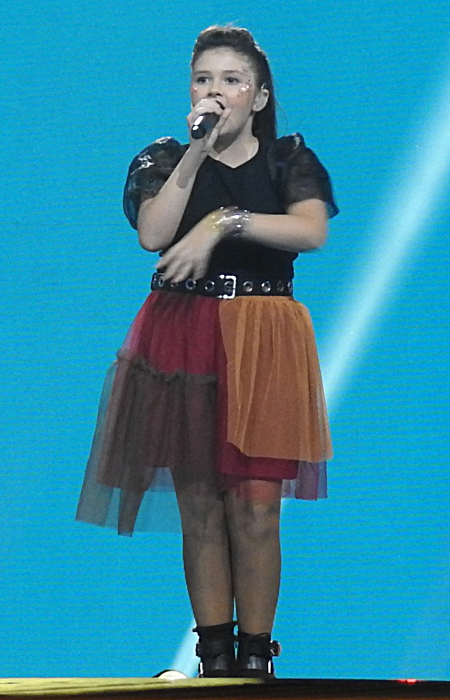

Background information
- Born: 27 April 2009 (age 16); Gouveia, Portugal
- Occupation: Singer
- Instrument: Vocals

(Portugal) "Vem Comigo (Come With Me)"

Junior Eurovision Song Contest 2019 entry
- Country: Portugal
- Artist(s): Joana Almeida
- Languages: Portuguese, English
- Composer(s): João Pedro Coimbra
- Lyricist(s): João Pedro Coimbra

Finals performance
- Final result: 16th
- Final points: 43

Entry chronology
- ◄ "Gosto de Tudo (Já Não Gosto de Nada)" (2018)

=== Joana Almeida ===
Joana Almeida (born 27 April 2009) is a Portuguese child singer. She represented Portugal at the Junior Eurovision Song Contest 2019 with the song "Vem comigo (Come With Me)".

=== Vem comigo (Come With Me) ===
"Vem comigo (Come With Me)" is a song by Portuguese singer Joana Almeida. It represented Portugal at the Junior Eurovision Song Contest 2019.

== At Junior Eurovision ==
During the opening ceremony and the running order draw which both took place on 18 November 2019, Portugal was drawn to perform sixteenth on 24 November 2019, following Armenia and preceding Italy.

=== Voting ===
The same voting system that was introduced in the 2017 edition was used, where the results were determined by 50% online voting and 50% jury voting. Every participating broadcaster assembled a national jury that consisted of three music industry professionals and two children aged between 10 and 15 who were citizens of the country they represented. The rankings of those jurors were combined to make an overall top ten.

The online voting consisted of two phases. The first phase of the online voting began on 22 November 2019 when a recap of all the rehearsal performances was shown on the contest's website Junioreurovision.tv before the viewers could vote. After this, voters also had the option to watch longer one-minute clips from each participant's rehearsal. This first round of voting ended on 24 November at 15:59 CET. The second phase of the online voting took place during the live show and began right after the last performance and was open for 15 minutes. International viewers were able vote for a minimum of three and a maximum of five songs. They were also able to vote for their own country's song. These votes were then turned into points which were determined by the percentage of votes received. For example, if a song received 10% of the votes, it received 10% of the available points.

In the contest, Portugal received no points from the professional juries; they received 43 points from the online vote.

Points awarded by Portugal
Score	Country
12 points	Netherlands
10 points	North Macedonia
8 points	Spain
7 points	France
6 points	Kazakhstan
5 points	Poland
4 points	Armenia
3 points	Ireland
2 points	Russia
1 point	Italy

==== Detailed voting results ====
The following members comprised the Portuguese jury:

- Bernado Pereira
- Paulo Castelo
- Sofia Viera Lopes
- Nuno Siqueria
- Rita Laranjeira – represented Portugal in the Junior Eurovision Song Contest 2018

Detailed voting results from Portugal
Draw	Country	Juror A	Juror B	Juror C	Juror D	Juror E	Rank	Points
01	Australia	8	17	15	9	12	15	
02	France	3	3	17	3	5	4	7
03	Russia	18	8	2	8	18	9	2
04	North Macedonia	9	1	1	11	2	2	10
05	Spain	5	16	11	1	1	3	8
06	Georgia	11	18	3	15	17	12	
07	Belarus	6	15	9	17	13	14	
08	Malta	12	13	18	18	15	17	
09	Wales	17	14	16	13	16	18	
10	Kazakhstan	10	5	6	2	10	5	6
11	Poland	4	9	5	6	6	6	5
12	Ireland	7	10	4	7	9	8	3
13	Ukraine	15	12	7	5	11	11	
14	Netherlands	1	2	8	4	3	1	12
15	Armenia	2	7	14	14	4	7	4
16	Portugal							
17	Italy	13	4	10	10	8	10	1
18	Albania	16	11	12	12	14	16	
19	Serbia	14	6	13	16	7	13	
