= Belarus in the Junior Eurovision Song Contest 2019 =

- Junior Eurovision Song Contest 2019
- Country: Belarus
- Selection process: National final
- Selection date: 20 September 2019

Competing entry
- Song: "Pepelny (Ashen)"
- Artist: Liza Misnikova
- Songwriters: Kirill Good; Natalya Tambovtseva; Liza Misnikova

Placement
- Final result: 11th, 92 points

Participation chronology

Belarus was represented at the Junior Eurovision Song Contest 2019, held in Gliwice, Poland on 24 November 2019. The Belarusian entry for the 2019 contest was selected through a national final organised by the Belarusian broadcaster National State Television and Radio Company of the Republic of Belarus. It saw ten competing acts participating in a televised production where the winner was determined by a 50/50 combination of votes from a jury made up of music professionals and a public vote. Liza Misnikova represented Belarus with the song "Pepelny (Ashen)".

== Background ==
Prior to the 2019 contest, Belarus had participated in the Junior Eurovision Song Contest sixteen times since its first entry at the inaugural contest in 2003. Belarus have taken part in every edition of the contest since 2003, and have won the contest twice: in 2005 with Ksenia Sitnik performing the song "My vmeste"; and again in 2007 with Alexey Zhigalkovich performing the entry "S druz'yami". The country previously hosted the 2010 contest in Minsk and hosted for a second year in 2018, with Daniel Yastremski representing the country with the song "Time". It ended in 11th place with 114 points.

== Before Junior Eurovision ==
=== National final ===
The national final took place on 20 September 2019. Liza Misnikova was the winner of the event with the song "Pepelny (Ashen)" and went on to represent the nation at the Junior Eurovision Song Contest 2019.

Final – 20 September 2019
Draw	Artist	Song	Jury	Televote		Total	Place
1	Liza Misnikova	"Pepelny" (Пепельный)	10	1,526	10	20	1
2	Anastasiya Zhabko	"Poymi menya" (Пойми меня)	8	302	1	9	6
3	Mariya Zhilina	"Spyavala, gukala, chakala" (Спявала, гукала, чакала)	2	1,455	7	9	7
4	Kseniya Galetskaya	"A Better World"	3	858	4	7	9
5	Monkey Tops	"Posmotri na nas" (Посмотри на нас)	12	874	5	17	3
6	Sofiya Khrolovich	"Davay tantsuy" (Давай танцуй)	1	1,503	8	9	8
7	Sofiya Rustamova	"Skazhi mne" (Скажи мне)	5	1,264	6	11	4
8	Zefir	"Luchshiye i pervyye" (Лучшие и первые)	4	341	2	6	10
9	Arina Pehtereva	"Never Again"	7	713	3	10	5
10	Mariya Yermakova	"Vetra" (Ветра) (Note: Yermakova ultimately performed the Belarusian-language version of the song, titled "Viatry"; however, as this change had not been coordinated with the producers, the Russian title remained displayed instead.)	6	1,907	12	18	2

== At Junior Eurovision ==
During the opening ceremony and the running order draw which both took place on 18 November 2019, Belarus was drawn to perform seventh on 24 November 2019, following Georgia and preceding Malta.

=== Voting ===
The same voting system that was introduced in the 2017 edition was used, where the results were determined by 50% online voting and 50% jury voting. Every participating broadcaster assembled a national jury that consisted of three music industry professionals and two children aged between 10 and 15 who were citizens of the country they represented. The rankings of those jurors were combined to make an overall top ten.

The online voting consisted of two phases. The first phase of the online voting began on 22 November 2019 when a recap of all the rehearsal performances was shown on the contest's website Junioreurovision.tv before the viewers could vote. After this, voters also had the option to watch longer one-minute clips from each participant's rehearsal. This first round of voting ended on 24 November at 15:59 CET. The second phase of the online voting took place during the live show and began right after the last performance and was open for 15 minutes. International viewers were able to vote for a minimum of three and a maximum of five songs. They were also able to vote for their own country's song. These votes were then turned into points which were determined by the percentage of votes received. For example, if a song received 10% of the votes, it received 10% of the available points.

Points awarded to Belarus
Score	Country
12 points	
10 points	Italy
8 points	
7 points	Ireland
6 points	Armenia; Australia; Spain
5 points	
4 points	
3 points	France; Malta
2 points	Poland
1 point	Netherlands
Belarus received 48 points from the online vote

Points awarded by Belarus
Score	Country
12 points	Kazakhstan
10 points	Poland
8 points	Ukraine
7 points	Spain
6 points	France
5 points	North Macedonia
4 points	Australia
3 points	Armenia
2 points	Italy
1 point	Serbia

==== Detailed voting results ====
Detailed voting results from Belarus
Draw	Country	Juror A	Juror B	Juror C	Juror D	Juror E	Rank	Points
01	Australia	10	13	7	6	4	7	4
02	France	5	16	5	4	6	5	6
03	Russia	16	15	15	15	13	17	
04	North Macedonia	11	12	11	7	2	6	5
05	Spain	3	2	9	5	8	4	7
06	Georgia	14	11	6	10	10	11	
07	Belarus							
08	Malta	15	10	12	16	15	15	
09	Wales	18	18	17	17	17	18	
10	Kazakhstan	2	1	3	1	1	1	12
11	Poland	1	3	1	2	5	2	10
12	Ireland	13	9	14	12	16	14	
13	Ukraine	7	6	2	3	3	3	8
14	Netherlands	6	14	10	9	14	13	
15	Armenia	4	7	8	8	12	8	3
16	Portugal	17	8	18	18	18	16	
17	Italy	8	17	4	11	7	9	2
18	Albania	9	5	16	14	11	12	
19	Serbia	12	4	13	13	9	10	1
