= Ukraine in the Junior Eurovision Song Contest 2019 =

- Junior Eurovision Song Contest 2019
- Country: Ukraine
- Selection process: Internal selection
- Announcement date: 19 August 2019

Competing entry
- Song: "The Spirit of Music"
- Artist: Sophia Ivanko
- Songwriters: Sophia Ivanko; Mykhailo Tolmachov

Placement
- Final result: 15th, 59 points

Participation chronology

Ukraine was represented at the Junior Eurovision Song Contest 2019 in Gliwice, Poland with the song "The Spirit of Music" performed by Sophia Ivanko. Their entrant was selected through an internal selection, organised by the Ukrainian broadcaster UA:PBC.

== Background ==
Prior to the 2019 Contest, Ukraine had participated in the Junior Eurovision Song Contest thirteen times since its debut in 2006. Ukraine have never missed a contest since their debut appearance, having won the contest once in 2012 with the song "Nebo", performed by Anastasiya Petryk. The Ukrainian capital Kyiv has hosted the contest twice, at the Palace of Sports in 2009, and the Palace "Ukraine" in 2013. In the 2018 contest, Darina Krasnovetska represented her country in Minsk, Belarus with the song "Say Love". She ended 4th out of 20 entries with 182 points.

== Before Junior Eurovision ==
=== Internal selection ===
The Ukrainian representative was determined by a seven-member jury formed of both representatives of Ukrainian television, as well as music industry professionals and announced on 19 August 2019. The jury panel that selected the winner consisted of: Oleksandra Koltsova (singer, member of the UA:PBC board), Alyosha (singer, represented Ukraine at the Eurovision Song Contest 2010), Adam (singer, composer), Tanya Sha (singer, composer), Oleksandr Stasov (composer), Oksana Shibinskaya (Head of Delegation of Ukraine in the Eurovision Song Contest) and Stanislav Medvedev (Head of Entertainment at UA:PBC). Together with the winner announcement, jury member Alyosha also announced the reasoning for the selection of Sophia Ivanko, stating: "We have decided that Sofia Ivanko would be the best representative of Ukraine at the Junior Eurovision Song Contest this year. Why? Because she very much stands out from other participants, she is very special, she has her specific, very expressively emotional character, she is mysterious and there is something about her, not characteristic of other people or other participants. The song needs a little more extra work, and then it will be very cool material, a cool song. I hope that Ukraine’s entry will be highly appreciated not only here, in this room, but also all over the world."

Artist	Song
Alisa Chydzhan	"Novyi den" (Новий день)
Anhelina Terennikova	"Fly Away"
Evanhelina Zamula	"Malyu You" (Малю)
Mariya Tkachuk	"Nytochky" (Ниточки)
Oleksandr Balabanov	"Power in You"
Oleksandr Zazarashvilli	"Moia MA (Zalysheni v pit'mi...)" (Залишені в пітьмі...)
Polina Pisartsova	"My Friend"
Sophia Ivanko	"Koly zdaietsia" (Коли здається)
Valeriya Khrystyuk	"I Will Shine"
Varvara Koshova	"Dyvo v rozmayitti" (Диво в розмаїтті)

== At Junior Eurovision ==
During the opening ceremony and the running order draw which both took place on 18 November 2019, Ukraine was drawn to perform thirteenth on 24 November 2019, following Ireland and preceding Netherlands.

=== Voting ===
The same voting system that was introduced in the 2017 edition was used, where the results were determined by 50% online voting and 50% jury voting. Every participating broadcaster assembled a national jury that consisted of three music industry professionals and two children aged between 10 and 15 who were citizens of the country they represented. The rankings of those jurors were combined to make an overall top ten.

The online voting consisted of two phases. The first phase of the online voting began on 22 November 2019 when a recap of all the rehearsal performances was shown on the contest's website Junioreurovision.tv before the viewers could vote. After this, voters also had the option to watch longer one-minute clips from each participant's rehearsal. This first round of voting ended on 24 November at 15:59 CET. The second phase of the online voting took place during the live show and began right after the last performance and was open for 15 minutes. International viewers were able to vote for a minimum of three and a maximum of five songs. They were also able to vote for their own country's song. These votes were then turned into points which were determined by the percentage of votes received. For example, if a song received 10% of the votes, it received 10% of the available points.

Points awarded to Ukraine
Score	Country
12 points	
10 points	
8 points	Belarus
7 points	Armenia
6 points	Kazakhstan
5 points	
4 points	
3 points	Australia; Serbia
2 points	
1 point	Albania
Ukraine received 31 points from the online vote

Points awarded by Ukraine
Score	Country
12 points	Kazakhstan
10 points	Australia
8 points	Poland
7 points	North Macedonia
6 points	Spain
5 points	Italy
4 points	Armenia
3 points	Ireland
2 points	Netherlands
1 point	Serbia

==== Detailed voting results ====
Detailed voting results from Ukraine
Draw	Country	Juror A	Juror B	Juror C	Juror D	Juror E	Rank	Points
01	Australia	4	2	9	2	3	2	10
02	France	6	14	10	12	10	13	
03	Russia	10	16	15	10	13	15	
04	North Macedonia	3	4	6	7	11	4	7
05	Spain	2	7	11	6	7	5	6
06	Georgia	14	12	4	8	9	11	
07	Belarus	17	10	12	5	8	12	
08	Malta	18	8	18	14	17	16	
09	Wales	9	18	14	15	16	17	
10	Kazakhstan	1	3	5	1	2	1	12
11	Poland	11	1	7	4	1	3	8
12	Ireland	15	9	3	16	4	8	3
13	Ukraine							
14	Netherlands	8	13	8	3	12	9	2
15	Armenia	13	15	1	11	6	7	4
16	Portugal	16	17	17	17	18	18	
17	Italy	7	6	2	9	14	6	5
18	Albania	12	5	16	18	15	14	
19	Serbia	5	11	13	13	5	10	1
