= Armenia in the Junior Eurovision Song Contest 2019 =

- Junior Eurovision Song Contest 2019
- Country: Armenia
- Selection process: Depi Mankakan Evratesil 2019
- Selection date: 15 September 2019

Competing entry
- Song: "Colours of Your Dream"
- Artist: Karina Ignatyan
- Songwriters: Taras Demchuk; Avet Barseghyan; Margarita Doroshevich

Placement
- Final result: 9th, 115 points

Participation chronology

Armenia was represented at the Junior Eurovision Song Contest 2019, held in Gliwice, Poland on 24 November 2019. The Armenian broadcaster Armenian Public Television (ARMTV) was responsible for organising their entry for the contest. Karina Ignatyan was chosen with her song "Colours of Your Dream".

== Background ==
Prior to the 2019 contest, Armenia had participated in the Junior Eurovision Song Contest twelve times since its first entry in 2007, with their best result being in 2010 when they won with the song "Mama", performed by Vladimir Arzumanyan. Armenia went on to host the Junior Eurovision Song Contest 2011 in the Armenian capital Yerevan. In the 2018 contest, Levon represented country in Minsk, Belarus with the song "L.E.V.O.N". The song ended 9th out of 20 entries with 125 points.

== Before Junior Eurovision ==
=== Depi Mankakan Evratesil 2019 ===
Depi Makankan Evratesil 2019 (Armenian: Դեպի Մանկական Եվրատեսիլ 2019; "Towards Junior Eurovision 2019") was the second edition of the national final Depi Mankakan Evratesil and selected the Armenian entry for the Junior Eurovision Song Contest 2019. The competition took place on 15 September 2019 at the AMPTV studios in Yerevan. Ten entries competed and the winner was determined by the combination of votes from international and Armenian jury panels and a public vote. The show was broadcast on Armenia 1 as well as online via the broadcaster's website 1tv.am.

==== Competing entries ====
A submission period for artists was held from 19 June 2019. Auditions were held to select the participants for the live show, and the ten finalists were revealed on 3 September 2019.

Artist	Song	Songwriter(s)
Anahit Arakelyan	"Chem handznvi" (Չեմ հանձնվի)	Ruzan Mkrtchyan, Aram Martikyan
Ani Atayan	"Every Time"	Ani Atayan
Anishock	"Selfie Yerevan"	Artem Valter
Anzhela Albertyan	"Khaghanq khaghagh" (Խաղանք խաղաղ)	Vazgen Koloyan, Mariam Hovhannisyan
Emily Hovhannisyan	"Parum enq pary" (Պարում ենք պարը)	Mane Araqelyan, Elita Harutyunyan
Karina Ignatyan	"Colours of Your Dream"	Taras Demchuk, Avet Barseghyan, Margarita Doroshevich
Narek Markosyan	"Im ergy" (Իմ երգը)	Armen Gevorgyan, Qnarik Sasunyan
Robert Bagratyan	"Captain Friendship"	Robert Bagratyan, Timur Kamishanskiy, Arthur Aghekyan
Roza Eloyan	"Im qaghaq" (Իմ քաղաք)	Karen Sevak, Avet Barseghyan
Vardan Margaryan	"La La La"	Tokionine, Suzanne Khanzadian

==== Final ====
The national final took place on 15 September 2019. The winner was decided through a combination of SMS voting (1/3), an international adult jury (1/3) and an international kids jury (1/3). At the end of the event, Karina Ignatyan (Armenian: Կարինա Իգնատյան, born on 7 July 2006) was selected with the song "Colours of Your Dream". The song was written by Taras Demchuk, Avet Barseghyan and Margarita Doroshevish and contained lyrics in Armenian and English.

Final – 15 September 2019
Draw	Artist	Song	Adult jury	Kids jury	Televote		Total	Place
Draw	Artist	Song	Adult jury	Kids jury	Votes	Points	Total	Place
1	Karina Ignatyan	"Colours of Your Dream"	46	42	2,091	50	138	1
2	Narek Markosyan	"Im ergy"	16	26	589	25	67	7
3	Anzhela Albertyan	"Khaghanq khaghagh"	32	23	516	20	75	5
4	Roza Eloyan	"Im qaghaq"	32	30	947	35	97	3
5	Robert Bagratyan	"Captain Friendship"	31	35	501	15	81	4
6	Emily Hovhannisyan	"Parum enq pary"	20	18	156	5	43	10
7	Anishock	"Selfie Yerevan"	12	22	741	30	64	8
8	Ani Atayan	"Every Time"	16	19	1,201	40	75	5
9	Vardan Margaryan	"La La La"	47	43	1,317	45	135	2
10	Anahit Arakelyan	"Chem handznvi"	23	17	370	10	50	9

Detailed adult jury votes
Draw	Song	(Belarus)	(Georgia (country))	(Bulgaria)	(Italy)	(Armenia)	Total
1	"Colours of Your Dream"	7	9	10	10	10	46
2	"Im ergy"	5	2	4	3	2	16
3	"Khaghanq khaghagh"	6	4	8	8	6	32
4	"Im qaghaq"	9	5	6	7	5	32
5	"Captain Friendship"	8	7	3	5	8	31
6	"Parum enq pary"	1	6	2	4	7	20
7	"Selfie Yerevan"	2	3	5	1	1	12
8	"Every Time"	4	1	1	6	4	16
9	"La La La"	10	10	9	9	9	47
10	"Chem handznvi"	3	8	7	2	3	23
Jury Members
(Belarus) – Olga Salamakha; (Georgia (country)) – Natia Mshvenieradze; (Bulgaria) – Borislav Milanov; (Italy) – Nicola Caligiore; (Armenia) – Lilith Navasardyan

Detailed kids jury votes
Draw	Song	(Poland)	(Ukraine)	(France)	(Belarus)	(Israel)	Total
1	"Colours of Your Dream"	10	10	10	9	3	42
2	"Im ergy"	7	4	5	8	2	26
3	"Khaghanq khaghagh"	5	8	4	5	1	23
4	"Im qaghaq"	4	9	6	7	4	30
5	"Captain Friendship"	9	7	7	6	6	35
6	"Parum enq pary"	2	2	8	1	5	18
7	"Selfie Yerevan"	6	3	3	2	8	22
8	"Every Time"	1	5	2	4	7	19
9	"La La La"	8	6	9	10	10	43
10	"Chem handznvi"	3	1	1	3	9	17
Jury Members
(Poland) – Roksana Węgiel; (Ukraine) – Darina Krasnovetska; (France) – Angelina; (Belarus) – Daniel Yastremski; (Israel) – Noam Dadon

== Artist and song information ==
=== Karina Ignatyan ===
Karina Ignatyan
- Born: July 7, 2006 (age 19); Kaluga, Russia
- Origin: Armenia

Karina Ignatyan (Armenian: Կարինա Իգնատյան; born 7 July 2006) is an Armenian-Russian born singer who represented Armenia at the Junior Eurovision Song Contest 2019 with the song "Colours of Your Dream", finishing ninth. She has participated in many competitions throughout her career such as The Voice Kids Russia and New Wave Junior.

It was announced that she would be the spokesperson for Armenia in the Junior Eurovision Song Contest 2021 where she announced that Armenia gave their 12 points to Georgia. She also hosted the Junior Eurovision Song Contest 2022 alongside, Iveta Mukuchyan, and Garik Papoyan.

=== Colours of Your Dream ===
"Colours of Your Dream" is a song by Armenian singer Karina Ignatyan. It won Depi Mankakan Evratesil 2019 and represented Armenia at the Junior Eurovision Song Contest 2019. The song written and composed by Taras Demchuk, Avet Barseghyan and Margarita Doroshevish. The music video for the song was released on 3 November 2019 During Ignatyans performance she was joined by four dancers, the song would later place 9th with 115 points.

== At Junior Eurovision ==
During the opening ceremony and the running order draw which both took place on 18 November 2019, Armenia was drawn to perform 15th at the 24 November 2019 contest, following Netherlands and preceding Portugal. Vika Martirosyan was the organizer and choreographer of the dance in both the music video and stage performance. The Armenian entry came 9th with 115 points.

=== Voting ===
The same voting system that was introduced in the 2017 edition was used, where the results were determined by 50% online voting and 50% jury voting. Every participating broadcaster assembled a national jury that consisted of three music industry professionals and two children aged between 10 and 15 who were citizens of the country they represented. The rankings of those jurors were combined to make an overall top ten.

The online voting consisted of two phases. The first phase of the online voting began on 22 November 2019 when a recap of all the rehearsal performances was shown on the contest's website Junioreurovision.tv before the viewers could vote. After this, voters also had the option to watch longer one-minute clips from each participant's rehearsal. This first round of voting ended on 24 November at 15:59 CET. The second phase of the online voting took place during the live show and began right after the last performance and was open for 15 minutes. International viewers were able to vote for a minimum of three and a maximum of five songs. They were also able to vote for their own country's song. These votes were then turned into points which were determined by the percentage of votes received. For example, if a song received 10% of the votes, it received 10% of the available points.

Points awarded to Armenia
Score	Country
12 points	
10 points	Russia
8 points	Australia
7 points	Georgia; Spain
6 points	Albania; North Macedonia
5 points	France; Kazakhstan
4 points	Portugal; Ukraine
3 points	Belarus; Poland
2 points	Malta
1 point	
Armenia received 45 points from the online vote

Points awarded by Armenia
Score	Country
12 points	Netherlands
10 points	Russia
8 points	Georgia
7 points	Ukraine
6 points	Belarus
5 points	Australia
4 points	Kazakhstan
3 points	North Macedonia
2 points	Italy
1 point	France

==== Detailed voting results ====
Detailed voting results from Armenia
Draw	Country	Juror A	Juror B	Juror C	Juror D	Juror E	Rank	Points
01	Australia	7	4	4	7	7	6	5
02	France	4	13	14	8	16	10	1
03	Russia	2	2	2	1	5	2	10
04	North Macedonia	10	8	10	5	8	8	3
05	Spain	13	15	18	9	18	16	
06	Georgia	3	1	1	6	2	3	8
07	Belarus	9	7	9	3	3	5	6
08	Malta	16	11	13	10	11	13	
09	Wales	17	9	15	12	9	12	
10	Kazakhstan	5	5	5	13	17	7	4
11	Poland	12	12	12	11	15	15	
12	Ireland	11	14	11	14	12	14	
13	Ukraine	6	6	8	4	4	4	7
14	Netherlands	1	3	3	2	1	1	12
15	Armenia							
16	Portugal	18	17	16	18	13	18	
17	Italy	8	10	7	17	6	9	2
18	Albania	15	18	17	16	14	17	
19	Serbia	14	16	6	15	10	11	
