= Jon Gregory (music producer) =

- Born: 29 January 1971 (age 54); Wick, Caithness, Scotland
- Genres: Pop, rock
- Occupation: Record producer

Jonathan Gregory (born 29 January 1971) is a Scottish record producer.

== Biography ==
Jonathan Gregory was born in Wick, Caithness, Scotland. He produced the 2010 Eurovision entry for Cyprus, "Life Looks Better in Spring", performed by Jon Lilygreen and The Islanders.
