= Tara Bethan =

British actor, singer and dancer

- Born: Tara Bethan Williams; 8 December 1983 (age 42); Llansannan, Wales
- Occupations: Actress; singer; presenter
- Father: Orig Williams

Tara Bethan Williams (born 8 December 1983) is a Welsh actress, singer and tv host.

== Biography ==
Daughter of professional footballer and wrestler Orig Williams, Bethan was brought up in Llansannan and Rhyl.

From a young age, Bethan sang and danced and performed in the Eisteddfod. She was educated at Aled Primary School in Llansannan and Ysgol Glan Clwyd. She later graduated with honours from Ivor Novello - Redroofs Theatre School, where she won "Most Promising Performer of the Year". She won the National Eisteddfod's Gwobr Goffa Wilbert Lloyd Roberts when it was held in Llanbedrgoch in 1999. She became the youngest member ever of the Gorsedd of Bards at Newport Eisteddfod at the age of 20.

Bethan began appearing on stage in north Wales from a young age, appearing in plays such as Cinderella, Jack And The Beanstalk and Peter Karrie Unmasked at the Pavilion Theatre in Rhyl, Goldilocks and the Three Bears at the Empire Theatre in Sunderland, My Fair Lady at the Royal Ascot Pavilion and Snow White And The Seven Dwarfs at the City of Varieties Theatre in Leeds. In 2004, she appeared as Laura in the series Emyn Roc a Rol and had a role as temptress Kelly in Footballer's Wives in a 90-minute special. Her debut album Does Neb yn fy Nabod i features her own, and eight compositions by Gwenno Dafydd and Heulwen Thomas, released on the Sain Records label. In 2006, she was presenter of the S4C children's fun show, Mama Mia. She appeared in I'd Do Anything in 2008 and was voted out by Andrew Lloyd Webber after she performed "Somewhere Over the Rainbow" She also had a role as a cowgirl in Cymru Fach and appeared in Rownd a Rownd.

Bethan did a UK tour of Joseph and the Amazing Technicolor Dreamcoat. in 2013. Bethan appeared in Bugsy Malone at the Queen's Theatre in London with the National Youth Music Theatre. She then appeared in the Welsh language soap opera Pobol Y Cwm from 2011 to 2016 and then again from 2018 to 2019.

From 2018, Bethan has been one of three main Welsh judges (alongside Connie Fisher and Stifyn Parri (series 1) / Lloyd Macey (series 2) ) on the panel of Junior Eurovision: Chwilio am Seren (English: Search for a Star), a singing competition organised by Rondo Media and broadcast on S4C, to select an entrant aged 9 to 14 to participate in the Junior Eurovision Song Contest 2018, representing Wales.
