= United Kingdom in the Junior Eurovision Song Contest =

- Junior Eurovision Song Contest
- Participating broadcaster: ITV (2003–2005); British Broadcasting Corporation (BBC; 2022–2023)

Participation summary
- Appearances: 5
- First appearance: 2003
- Last appearance: 2023
- Highest placement: 2nd: 2004
- Participation history: 2003; 2004; 2005; 2006 – 2021; 2022; 2023; 2024 – 2026

External links
- CBBC page
- For the most recent participation see United Kingdom in the Junior Eurovision Song Contest 2023

The United Kingdom has been represented at the Junior Eurovision Song Contest since the inaugural 2003 edition. ITV, a member organisation of the United Kingdom Independent Broadcasting (UKIB) participated from 2003 to 2005. It used a national selection format, broadcasting a show entitled Junior Eurovision Song Contest: The British Final, for its participation at the contests. Its first entry at the 2003 contest was "My Song For The World" by Tom Morley, which finished in third place out of sixteen participating entries, achieving a score of one hundred and eighteen points. ITV withdrew from competing after the 2005 contest, but the British Broadcasting Corporation (BBC) participated in 2022 and 2023 instead. The BBC withdrew from the 2024 contest.

== History ==
The United Kingdom is one of the sixteen countries to have made its debut at the inaugural Junior Eurovision Song Contest 2003, which took place on 15 November 2003 at the Forum in Copenhagen, Denmark. Child-singer, Tom Morley, was the first participant to represent the United Kingdom with the song "My Song For The World", which finished in third place out of sixteen participating entries, achieving a score of one hundred and eighteen points. Morley and Cory Spedding (2004) sang both for the peace in the world and Joni Fuller (2005) described her feelings. The country's best result at the contest was placing second in 2004 with the song "The Best is Yet to Come". The remaining British entrant finished in fourteenth position in 2005.

In 2003, the contest was broadcast live on the main channel ITV1, however the broadcaster decided to relegate it and the national final to digital channel ITV2 for the next two years due to poor viewing figures that year, before their complete withdrawal in 2006. A delayed broadcast, consisting of highlights, was aired the following afternoon on the main channel in 2004 and 2005. The inaugural contest, broadcast live on ITV1, averaged 5 million viewers. 1.9 million watched the 2004 contest on delay on ITV1 (221,000 watched the live coverage on ITV2). In 2005, the contest was watched by 700,000 viewers on ITV1 (down 63.16% compared with 2004 viewing figures), with 171,000 watching live on ITV2 (down 22.62% compared with 2004).

The 2004 contest originally should have been organised by Carlton Television for ITV in Manchester. In May 2003, it was confirmed that the UK would take part in Copenhagen and host the next edition. ITV then announced in May 2004 that due to financial and scheduling reasons, the contest would in fact not take place in the United Kingdom after all. In August 2004, it was reported that Granada Television, who would have co-produced the show with Carlton, had decided to pull out of the deal claiming that the original allocated budget of €1,500,000 to produce the contest was too small. The EBU reportedly offered a further €900,000 of funding to produce the contest, but ITV stated that it would have cost almost €2,500,000 to do so, and they asked the EBU to find a new host broadcaster. It is also thought that another factor to their decision was the previous years' audience ratings for ITV which were below the expected amount.

=== Radio broadcasts ===
On 21 November 2013, it was revealed that Edinburgh-based 98.8 Castle FM (a non EBU member) would broadcast the 2013 contest live to listeners in Scotland. The broadcasting rights had been offered by the EBU to its members, however when no-one in the UK took up the offer, Castle FM – previously known as Leith FM – moved in. The commentators were Ewan Spence and Luke Fisher.

It was announced on 16 October 2014 that the 2014 contest would be broadcast on a radio station across the United Kingdom. Five local radio stations broadcast the contest, one in England (103 The Eye, delayed) and Wales (Oystermouth Radio), and three in Scotland (K107 in Kirkcaldy, Radio Six International in Glasgow and Shore Radio in Edinburgh). Cotswold FM, Fun Kids, Oystermouth Radio, Radio Six International and Shore Radio transmitted the 2015 contest live with commentary again provided by Ewan Spence.

On 9 November 2016, Radio Six International announced that they would broadcast the 2016 contest live. Ewan Spence, Lisa-Jayne Lewis, Sharleen Wright and Ben Robertson provided the commentary for the radio stations Radio Six International, Fun Kids and 103 The Eye.

=== Welsh debut ===
The Welsh broadcaster Sianel Pedwar Cymru (S4C) had shown interest in participating for the UK in 2008, hoping to share the Welsh language with a wider audience. Before the digital switchover, the contest would therefore be a bilingual broadcast that would be broadcast in Wales on analogue, and on S4C Digidol in the rest of the UK. In the end, S4C chose not to broadcast the contest. S4C announced on 9 May 2018 that they would debut at the Junior Eurovision Song Contest 2018 to be held in Minsk, Belarus. However, S4C withdrew from the contest in 2020, citing the COVID-19 pandemic as the reason for their withdrawal, and have not returned to the contest since.

It was also reported that Scottish broadcaster BBC Alba had also been in talks with the EBU to enable Scotland to participate in 2020, having previously debuted in Eurovision Choir in 2019. However, on 29 June 2019, BBC Alba announced that they would not debut in 2020.

=== UK return and subsequent hiatus ===
In July 2020, it was reported that the British Broadcasting Corporation (BBC) were considering participation in the upcoming contest in Warsaw. The UK did not appear on the official list of participants as released by the EBU on 8 September 2020. At a Junior Eurovision press event in May 2021, the EBU stated that they were working to bring the United Kingdom back to the contest, possibly for the 2021 edition. However, once again the United Kingdom did not appear on the final list of participants for the 2021 contest which took place in Paris. On 17 December 2021, at a press conference between France Télévisions and the executive supervisor of the Junior Eurovision Song Contest Martin Österdahl, Österdahl stated that he was positive about talks between the European Broadcasting Union and the BBC about a potential return of the UK to the contest in the future. On 11 January 2022, it was speculated that the BBC were looking to return to the contest in 2023, the year marking the 20th anniversary of the first contest.

On 25 August 2022, it was confirmed that the United Kingdom would return to the contest in 2022, with the BBC replacing ITV as the country's broadcaster. The BBC internally selected Freya Skye to represent the United Kingdom with the song "Lose My Head" after an audition process held by the broadcaster. The British return proved successful, with Skye placing fifth with 146 points, winning the online vote. In 2023, the BBC continued the internal process, selecting girl group Stand Uniqu3 to represent the United Kingdom in Nice, France with the song "Back To Life". At the contest, the UK improved on the fifth place position, placing fourth overall with 160 points, the best result for the United Kingdom since 2004.

Despite two top-5 placings in 2022 and 2023, on 21 June 2024, the BBC announced that the United Kingdom would withdraw from the 2024 contest, without a given reason. According to an article posted by The Euro Trip Podcast on the same day, a spokesperson from the BBC stated the following, "We sometimes have to make difficult decisions and the BBC will not participate in the Junior Eurovision Song Contest this year. We would like to thank the artists and creative teams who represented the UK for the last two years."

== Participation overview ==
Table key
2	Second place
3	Third place

Participants
Year	Artist	Song	Language	Place	Points
2003	Tom Morley	"My Song for the World"	English	3	118
2004	Cory Spedding	"The Best Is Yet to Come"	English	2	140
2005	Joni Fuller	"How Does It Feel?"	English	14	28
2022	Freya Skye	"Lose My Head"	English	5	146
2023	Stand Uniqu3	"Back to Life"	English	4	160

== Related Involvement ==
=== Heads of delegation ===
Year	Head of delegation	Ref.
2022–2023	Lee Smithurst	

=== Commentators and spokespersons ===
The contests are broadcast online worldwide through the official Junior Eurovision Song Contest website junioreurovision.tv and YouTube. In 2015, the online broadcasts featured commentary in English by junioreurovision.tv editor Luke Fisher and 2011 Bulgarian Junior Eurovision Song Contest entrant Ivan Ivanov.

Between 2003 and 2005, the British broadcaster, ITV, sent their own commentator to each contest in order to provide commentary in the English language. From 2013 to 2020, the contest was broadcast by various non-participating radio stations. From 2022, the BBC broadcast the contest simultaneously on CBBC and BBC One, whilst in 2023, the BBC moved the contest to BBC Two in a simultaneous broadcast with CBBC. Spokespersons are also chosen by the national broadcaster in order to announce the awarding points from United Kingdom.

The table below list the details of each commentator and spokesperson since 2003.

Year	Television		Radio		Spokesperson	Ref.
Year	Channel	Commentator	Station	Commentator	Spokesperson	Ref.
2003	ITV1	Mark Durden-Smith and Tara Palmer-Tomkinson	No broadcast		Sasha Stevens	
2004	ITV2 (live); ITV1 (delayed)	Matt Brown	No broadcast		Charlie Allan	
2005	ITV2 (live); ITV1 (delayed)	Michael Underwood	No broadcast		Vicky Gordon	
2006–2012	No broadcast		No broadcast		Did not participate	—N/a
2013	No broadcast		98.8 Castle FM	Ewan Spence and Luke Fisher	Did not participate	
2014	No broadcast		Various radio stations (Note: In 2014, radio coverage was provided by 103 The Eye, K107, Oystermouth Radio, Radio Six International and Shore Radio. In 2015 by Cotswold FM, Fun Kids, Oystermouth Radio, Radio Six International and Shore Radio. Radio Six International, Fun Kids and 103 The Eye did so again in 2016.)	Ewan Spence	Did not participate	
2015	No broadcast		Various radio stations	Ewan Spence	Did not participate	
2016	No broadcast		Various radio stations	Ewan Spence, Lisa-Jayne Lewis, Sharleen Wright and Ben Robertson	Did not participate	
2017	No broadcast		Radio Six International	Ewan Spence and Lisa-Jayne Lewis	Did not participate	
2018	No broadcast		Radio Six International	Ewan Spence, Sharleen Wright and Ben Robertson	Did not participate	
2019	No broadcast		Fun Kids	Ewan Spence	Did not participate	
2020	No broadcast		Radio Six International	Ewan Spence and Ellie Chalkley	Did not participate	
2021	No broadcast		No broadcast		Did not participate	—N/a
2022	CBBC, BBC One	Lauren Layfield and Hrvy	No broadcast		Tabitha Joy	
2023	CBBC, BBC Two	Lauren Layfield and Hrvy	No broadcast		Charlie Poissenot	
2024–2026	No broadcast		No broadcast		Did not participate	

== See also ==
- United Kingdom in the Eurovision Song Contest – Senior version of the Junior Eurovision Song Contest.
- Wales in the Junior Eurovision Song Contest
