= Ireland in the Junior Eurovision Song Contest 2018 =

- Junior Eurovision Song Contest 2018
- Country: Ireland
- Selection process: National selection: Junior Eurovision Éire
- Selection date: Semi-final; 14 October 2018; 21 October 2018; 28 October 2018; 4 November 2018; Final; 11 November 2018

Competing entry
- Song: "IOU"
- Artist: Taylor Hynes
- Songwriters: Niall Mooney; Jonas Gladnikoff; Taylor Hynes

Placement
- Final result: 15th, 48 points

Participation chronology

Ireland was represented at the Junior Eurovision Song Contest 2018, which took place on 25 November 2018 in Minsk, Belarus. The Irish broadcaster TG4 is responsible for organising their entry for the contest through a national selection show entitled Junior Eurovision Éire. The national final took place on 11 November 2018, while the semifinals took place between 14 October and 4 November. This was Ireland's fourth appearance at the Junior Eurovision Song Contest.

== Background ==
Prior to the 2018 Contest, Ireland had participated in the Junior Eurovision Song Contest three times since its debut in 2015. TG4 previously attempted to participate at the Junior Eurovision Song Contest 2014, but required funding from the Broadcasting Authority of Ireland (BAI), which was rejected.

== Before Junior Eurovision ==
The Irish broadcaster was included in the final list of participants of the EBU, which revealed that they would be participating at Junior Eurovision for the third time in their history. The mechanism for selecting their entrant and song was through the national selection show Junior Eurovision Éire, like in their three other appearances. The selection process is scheduled to take place every Sunday starting on 14 October, where thirty-two participants competed, and culminated into a final which took place on 11 November 2018.

=== Jury members ===
| Artist | ESC Year(s) | Song(s) | Place (semi-final) | Points (semi-final) | Place (final) | Points (final) |
|---|---|---|---|---|---|---|
| Linda Martin | 1984 | "Terminal 3" | No semi-finals | | 2 | 137 |
| Linda Martin | 1992 | "Why Me?" | No semi-finals | | 1 | 155 |
| Niamh Kavanagh | 1993 | "In Your Eyes" | No semi-finals | | 1 | 187 |
| Niamh Kavanagh | 2010 | "It's for You" | 9 | 67 | 23 | 25 |
| Brian Kennedy | 2006 | "Every Song Is a Cry for Love" | 9 | 79 | 10 | 93 |
| Dustin the Turkey | 2008 | "Irelande Douze Pointe" | 15 | 22 | Failed to qualify | |
| Ryan O'Shaughnessy | 2018 | "Together" | 6 | 179 | 16 | 136 |

=== Junior Eurovision Éire ===
==== Semi Final 1 ====
The first semi final was broadcast on 14 October 2018, in which Ryan O'Shaughnessy was the guest judge and the opening act.

| Draw | Artist | Song | Result | Number of stars |
|---|---|---|---|---|
| 01 | Saibh Skelly | "Grian is Gealach le chéile" | Final Duel | 13 |
| 02 | Katie O'Connor | "Creidim i nGrá" | Eliminated | 11 |
| 03 | Jessica Doolan | "Aisling" | Final Duel | 15 |
| 04 | Faith Robinson | "Damhsa" | Eliminated | 11 |
| 05 | Grace O'Dwyer | "Ár nDomhan Beag" | Eliminated | 11 |
| 06 | Na Dynamos | "Fan Liom" | Eliminated | 11 |
| 07 | Kailen Garrett | "Mo Chuid Féin" | Eliminated | 11 |

Saibh Skelly and Jessica Doolan both advanced to the final duel stage and performed their songs for the second time. After their second performances, the jury members selected Jessica Doolan as the winner of this semi-final and she advanced to the grand final on 11 November.

==== Semi Final 2 ====
The second semi final was broadcast on 21 October 2018, in which Linda Martin was the guest judge and Aimee Banks was the opening act.

| Draw | Artist | Song | Result | Number of stars |
|---|---|---|---|---|
| 01 | Cailíní K.L.L. | "Grá go deo" | Eliminated | 10 |
| 02 | Sarah Kenny | "Áit ar bith eile ach anseo" | Final Duel | 13 |
| 03 | Julie Cole | "Fadhb" | Eliminated | 12 |
| 04 | David Bradley | "Bí cróga" | Eliminated | 12 |
| 05 | Kerry Ann McCreery | "Tóg mo lámh" | Final Duel | 13 |
| 06 | Ellen Keane | "Tusa amháin" | Eliminated | 12 |
| 07 | Erín Ní Rosach | "Cuireann tú isteach orm" | Eliminated | 10 |

Sarah Kenny and Kerry Ann Mc Creery advanced to the final duel stage and performed their songs for the second time. After their second performances, the jury members selected Kerry Ann McCreery as the winner of this semi-final, making her advance to the grand final on 11 November.

==== Semi Final 3 ====
The third semi-final was broadcast on 28 October 2018, in which Brian Kennedy was the guest judge and Zena Donnelly was the opening act.

| Draw | Artist | Song | Result | Number of stars |
|---|---|---|---|---|
| 01 | Saoirse Lynch | "Ar aghaidh linn" | Eliminated | 11 |
| 02 | Jemma Seery | "Níos láidre le chéile" | Eliminated | 11 |
| 03 | Anna and Ava | "Táimid le chéile" | Final Duel, Wildcard | 13 |
| 04 | Skye Murphy Darrer | "Dúchas" | Eliminated | 12 |
| 05 | Cora Harkin | "Cibé saol atá romham" | Final Duel | 15 |
| 06 | Taylor Lily Bulter | "D'amhrán" | Eliminated | 10 |
| 07 | Ciara Doherty | "Creid" | Eliminated | 11 |

Anna and Ava and Cora Harkin advanced to the final duel stage and performed their songs for the second time. After their second performances, the jury members selected Cora Harkin as the winner of this semi-final, making her advance to the grand final on 11 November.

==== Semi Final 4 ====
The fourth semi-final was broadcast on 4 November, in which Dustin the Turkey was the guest judge and Muireann McDonnell was the opening act.

| Draw | Artist | Song | Result | Number of stars |
|---|---|---|---|---|
| 01 | Taylor Hynes | "I.O.U." | Final Duel, Wildcard | 13 |
| 02 | Aoibhinn Ní Craoibhínn | "Misneach" | Eliminated | 12 |
| 03 | Aisling Mullarkey | "Is Déagóir Mé" | Eliminated | 12 |
| 04 | Shaniah Llane Rollo | "Cuimhnigh ar na Réaltaí" | Final Duel | 15 |
| 05 | Fia Lynn | "Éist Linn" | Eliminated | 10 |
| 06 | Ella Meakin Griffin | "Samhlaigh Liom" | Eliminated | 12 |
| 07 | Aoife McNerney | "Mo Ghrá, Mo Shaol" | Eliminated | 11 |

Taylor Hynes and Shaniah Llane Rollo advanced to the final duel of the show. After performing for a second time, the judges decided that Shaniah would advance to the final.

==== Final ====
The grand final was broadcast on 11 November. Niamh Kavanagh was the guest judge for this round. For the final, a sing-off was introduced between the top two contenders.

| Draw | Artist | Song | Result |
|---|---|---|---|
| 01 | Jessica Doolan | "Aisling" | Eliminated |
| 02 | Taylor Hynes | "I.O.U." | Final Duel |
| 03 | Cora Harkin | "Cibé saol atá romham" | Eliminated |
| 04 | Shaniah Llane Rollo | "Cuimhnigh ar na Réaltaí" | Final Duel |
| 05 | Anna and Ava | "Táimid le chéile" | Eliminated |
| 06 | Kerry Ann McCreery | "Tóg mo lámh" | Eliminated |

| Draw | Artist | Song | Result |
|---|---|---|---|
| 01 | Shaniah Llane Rollo | "Cuimhnigh ar na Réaltaí" | Runner-up |
| 02 | Taylor Hynes | "I.O.U." | Winner |

== Artist and song information ==
Taylor Hynes
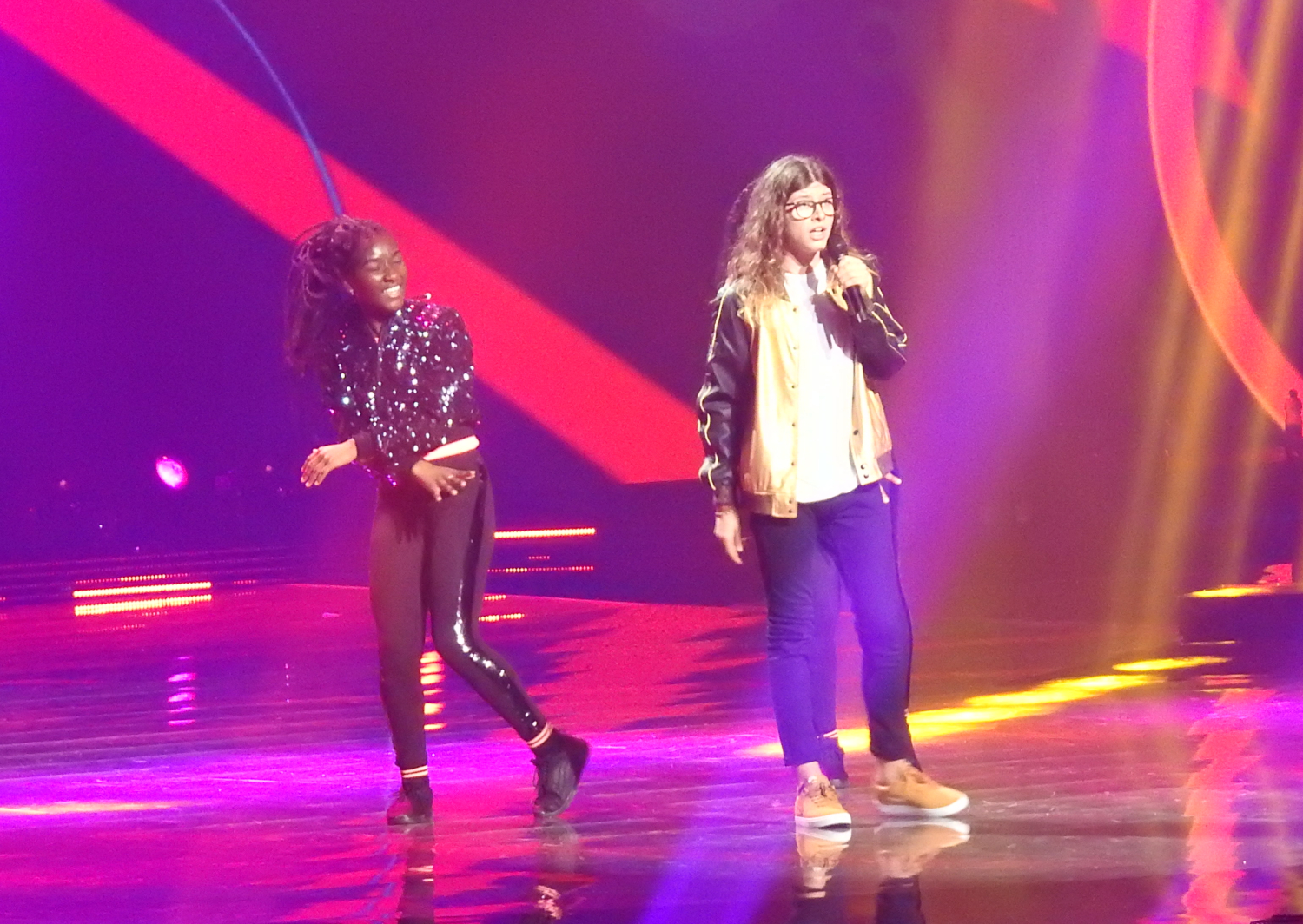

Background information
- Born: 7 February 2004 (age 22)
- Origin: Dublin, Ireland
- Genres: Pop
- Occupation: Singer
- Instrument: Vocals
- Years active: 2016-present

(Republic of Ireland) "IOU"

Junior Eurovision Song Contest 2018 entry
- Country: Ireland
- Artist: Taylor Hynes
- Language: Irish
- Composers: Niall Mooney; Jonas Gladnikoff; Taylor Hynes
- Lyricists: Niall Mooney; Jonas Gladnikoff; Taylor Hynes

Finals performance
- Final result: 15th
- Final points: 48

Entry chronology
- ◄ "Súile Glasa" (2017)
- "Banshee" (2019) ►

=== Taylor Hynes ===
Taylor Hynes (born 7 February 2004) is an Irish child singer. He represented Ireland in the Junior Eurovision Song Contest 2018 with the song "IOU". He previously entered Junior Eurovision Eire in 2016, where he failed to make the final. He returned to the selection in 2018 and came second in his heat, however a day after his heat was broadcast, he was leaked by Belarusian TV as Ireland's Junior Eurovision entrant. He was born in Dublin, but currently lives in Clonee.

=== IOU ===
IOU is a song by Irish child singer Taylor Hynes. It represented Ireland at the Junior Eurovision Song Contest 2018. The music video clip features Hynes alongside Eurovision winner Niamh Kavanagh and 2018 Irish entrant Ryan O'Shaughnessy.

== At Junior Eurovision ==
During the opening ceremony and the running order draw which both took place on 19 November 2018, Ireland was drawn to perform ninth on 25 November 2018, following Belarus and preceding Serbia.

=== Voting ===
The same voting system that was introduced in the 2017 edition was used, where the results were determined by 50% online voting and 50% jury voting. Every participating broadcaster assembled a national jury that consisted of three music industry professionals and two children aged between 10 and 15 who were citizens of the country they represented. The rankings of those jurors were combined to make an overall top ten.

The online voting consisted of two phases. The first phase of the online voting began on 23 November 2018 when a recap of all the rehearsal performances was shown on the contest's website Junioreurovision.tv before the viewers could vote. After this, voters also had the option to watch longer one-minute clips from each participant's rehearsal. This first round of voting ended on 25 November at 15:59 CET. The second phase of the online voting took place during the live show and began right after the last performance and was open for 15 minutes. International viewers were able to vote for a minimum of three and a maximum of five songs. They were also able to vote for their own country's song. These votes were then turned into points which were determined by the percentage of votes received. For example, if a song received 10% of the votes, it received 10% of the available points.

Points awarded to Ireland
| Score | Country |
|---|---|
| 12 points | |
| 10 points | |
| 8 points | Poland |
| 7 points | |
| 6 points | |
| 5 points | |
| 4 points | |
| 3 points | Georgia |
| 2 points | |
| 1 point | France |
Ireland received 36 points from the online vote

Points awarded by Ireland
| Score | Country |
|---|---|
| 12 points | Georgia |
| 10 points | Italy |
| 8 points | Malta |
| 7 points | Australia |
| 6 points | France |
| 5 points | Ukraine |
| 4 points | Kazakhstan |
| 3 points | Azerbaijan |
| 2 points | Belarus |
| 1 point | Albania |

==== Detailed voting results ====
Detailed voting results from Ireland
| Draw | Country | Juror A | Juror B | Juror C | Juror D | Juror E | Rank | Points |
|---|---|---|---|---|---|---|---|---|
| 01 | Ukraine | 3 | 6 | 2 | 12 | 6 | 6 | 5 |
| 02 | Portugal | 17 | 12 | 11 | 11 | 12 | 15 | |
| 03 | Kazakhstan | 7 | 7 | 13 | 3 | 3 | 7 | 4 |
| 04 | Albania | 16 | 16 | 17 | 6 | 5 | 10 | 1 |
| 05 | Russia | 8 | 8 | 12 | 17 | 18 | 14 | |
| 06 | Netherlands | 18 | 19 | 16 | 18 | 13 | 18 | |
| 07 | Azerbaijan | 10 | 5 | 5 | 13 | 11 | 8 | 3 |
| 08 | Belarus | 6 | 10 | 9 | 14 | 10 | 9 | 2 |
| 09 | Ireland | | | | | | | |
| 10 | Serbia | 15 | 15 | 14 | 8 | 7 | 11 | |
| 11 | Italy | 2 | 2 | 3 | 7 | 8 | 2 | 10 |
| 12 | Australia | 11 | 4 | 7 | 4 | 1 | 4 | 7 |
| 13 | Georgia | 1 | 3 | 1 | 1 | 4 | 1 | 12 |
| 14 | Israel | 12 | 13 | 10 | 19 | 19 | 16 | |
| 15 | France | 5 | 9 | 4 | 5 | 2 | 5 | 6 |
| 16 | Macedonia | 14 | 14 | 15 | 9 | 9 | 12 | |
| 17 | Armenia | 9 | 17 | 18 | 16 | 17 | 17 | |
| 18 | Wales | 19 | 18 | 19 | 10 | 14 | 19 | |
| 19 | Malta | 4 | 1 | 6 | 2 | 16 | 3 | 8 |
| 20 | Poland | 13 | 11 | 8 | 15 | 15 | 13 | |
