= Daneliya Tuleshova =

Kazakh singer (born 2006)

Daneliya Tuleshova Данэлия Төлешова
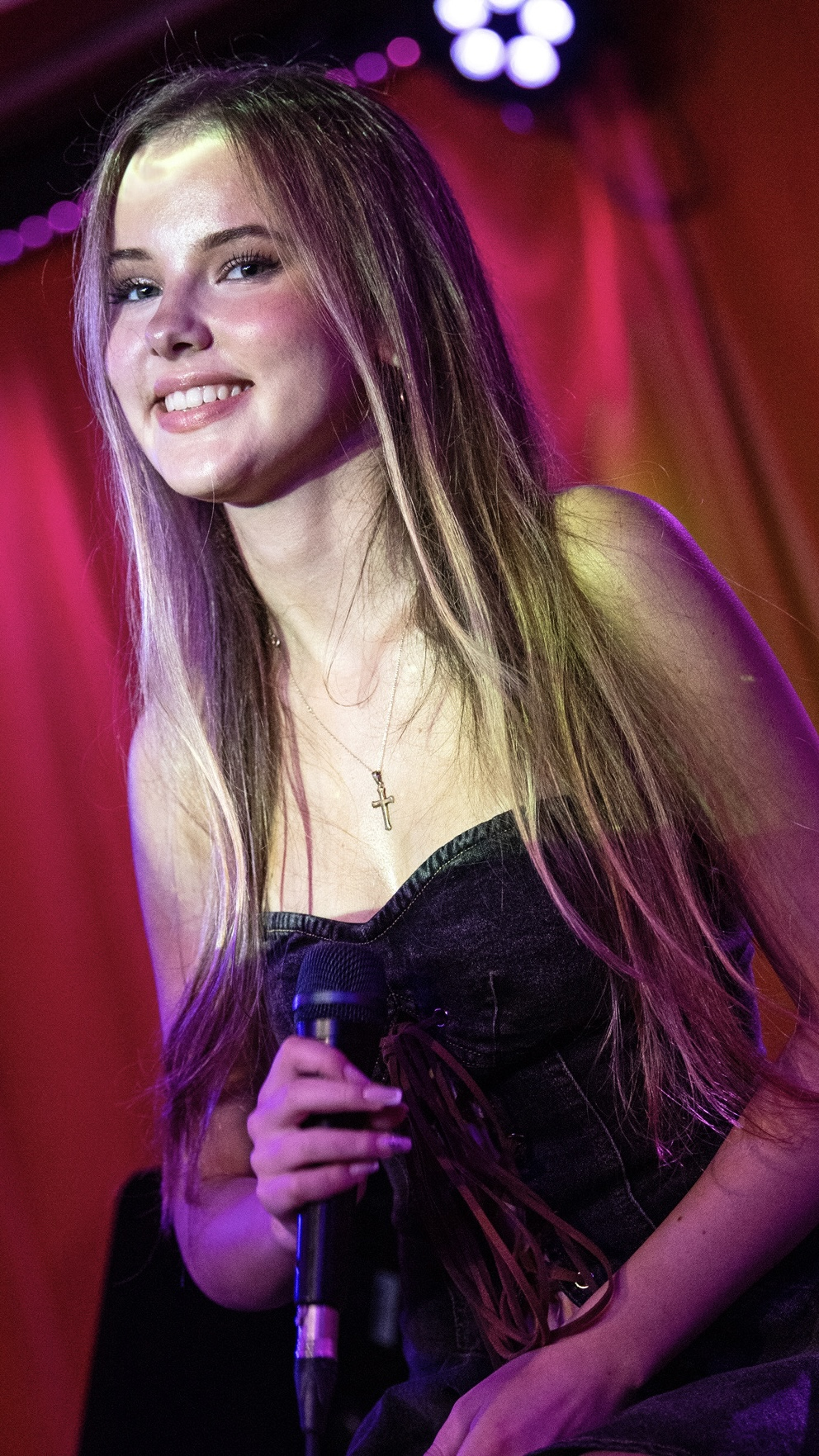
- Daneliya at Barboza 2024

Background information
- Also known as: DANELIYA, Da NeL
- Born: 18 July 2006 (age 19); Astana, Kazakhstan
- Origin: Almaty, Kazakhstan
- Genres: Pop; hip hop
- Occupations: Singer, Songwriter
- Instrument: Vocals
- Years active: 2015–present
- Labels: Daneliya Tuleshova Production; 4 Chords Records; DT Music Group; VANNS Music

YouTube information
- Channel: DANELIYA
- Genre: Music
- Subscribers: 1.55 million
- Views: 153.7 million
- Last updated: 12 Feb 2026

Daneliya Tuleshova (Kazakh: Данэлия Төлешова, romanized: Danelia Töleşova, born 18 July 2006) is a Kazakh singer. She represented Kazakhstan in the Junior Eurovision Song Contest 2018 in Minsk, Belarus with her song "Ózińe sen", finishing sixth.

Before Junior Eurovision, she won the 2017 season of The Voice Kids Ukraine and was a finalist in Children's New Wave 2015. In 2019, she took part in The World's Best, representing her country alongside Dimash Kudaibergen. She was a finalist on the 2020 season of America's Got Talent.

== Early life ==
Daneliya Tuleshova was born on 18 July 2006 in the capital of Kazakhstan, Astana to Elena Tuleshova and Alexander Tuleshov, both originating from mixed Kazakh and Tatar families living in Kazakhstan for years. She has two younger siblings.

After recovering from a gymnastics injury at the age of four, she began practicing ballroom dancing. She also took contemporary dance classes in Almaty and simultaneously attended acting and singing classes. In late 2018, she was a sixth grader at the Ukrainian Physics and Mathematics Lyceum where she focused on mathematics. Although Tuleshova was born in Astana, she said (in an interview with Kazakh video producer Rauana Kokumbaeva that was put on YouTube in February 2019) that her hometown is the city of Almaty.

== Career ==
=== Career beginnings ===
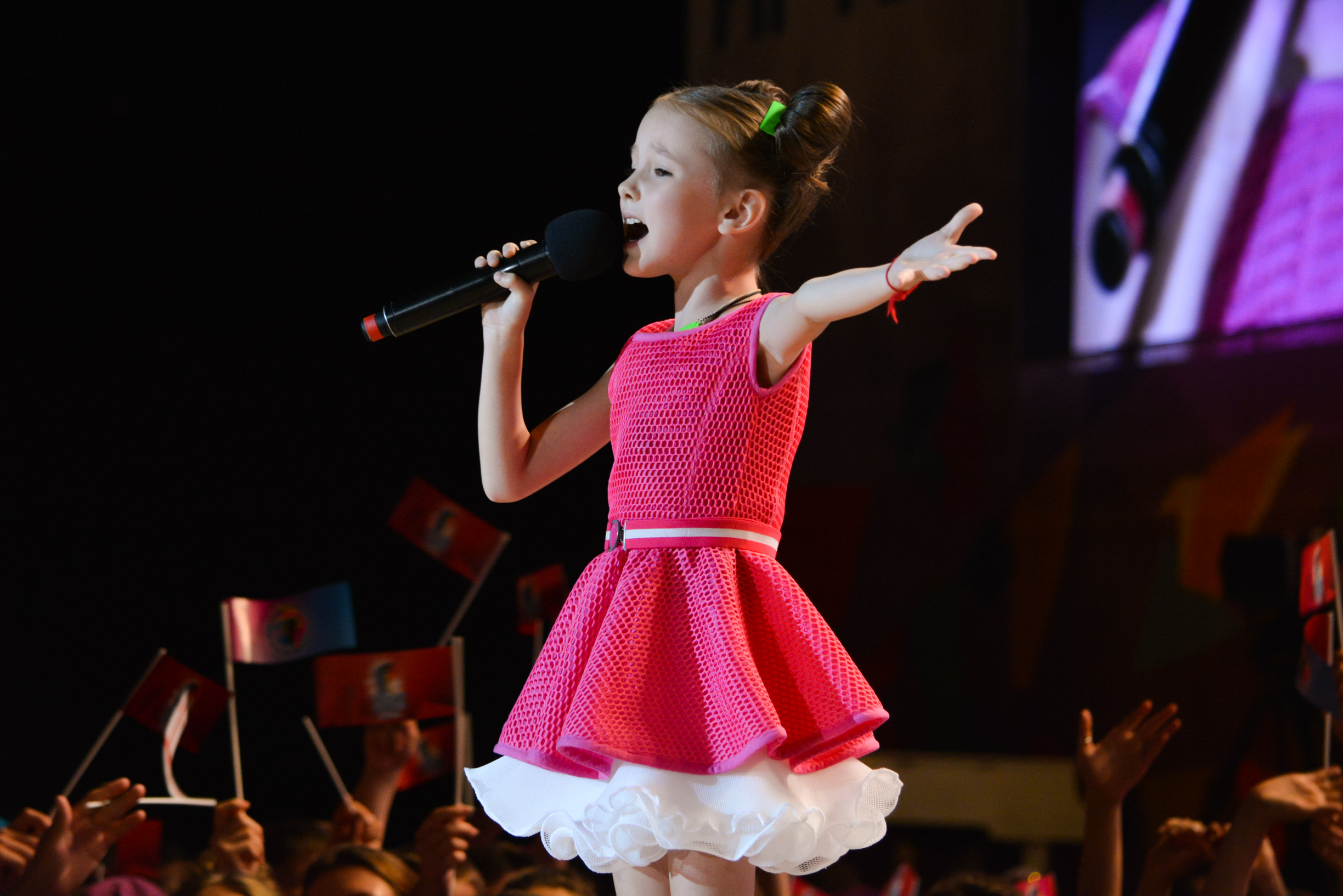
Tuleshova performing at the Children's New Wave in Sochi, Russia.

At the age of eight, she was spotted by the organizers of the Kazakh singing competition Ayaglagan Astana, the selection round for the Children's New Wave, an international contest for young performers held annually in Russia. In 2015, Daneliya won the competition and reached the finals of Children's New Wave, where she won the Audience Award.

=== 2017–2018: The Voice Kids Ukraine and Junior Eurovision ===
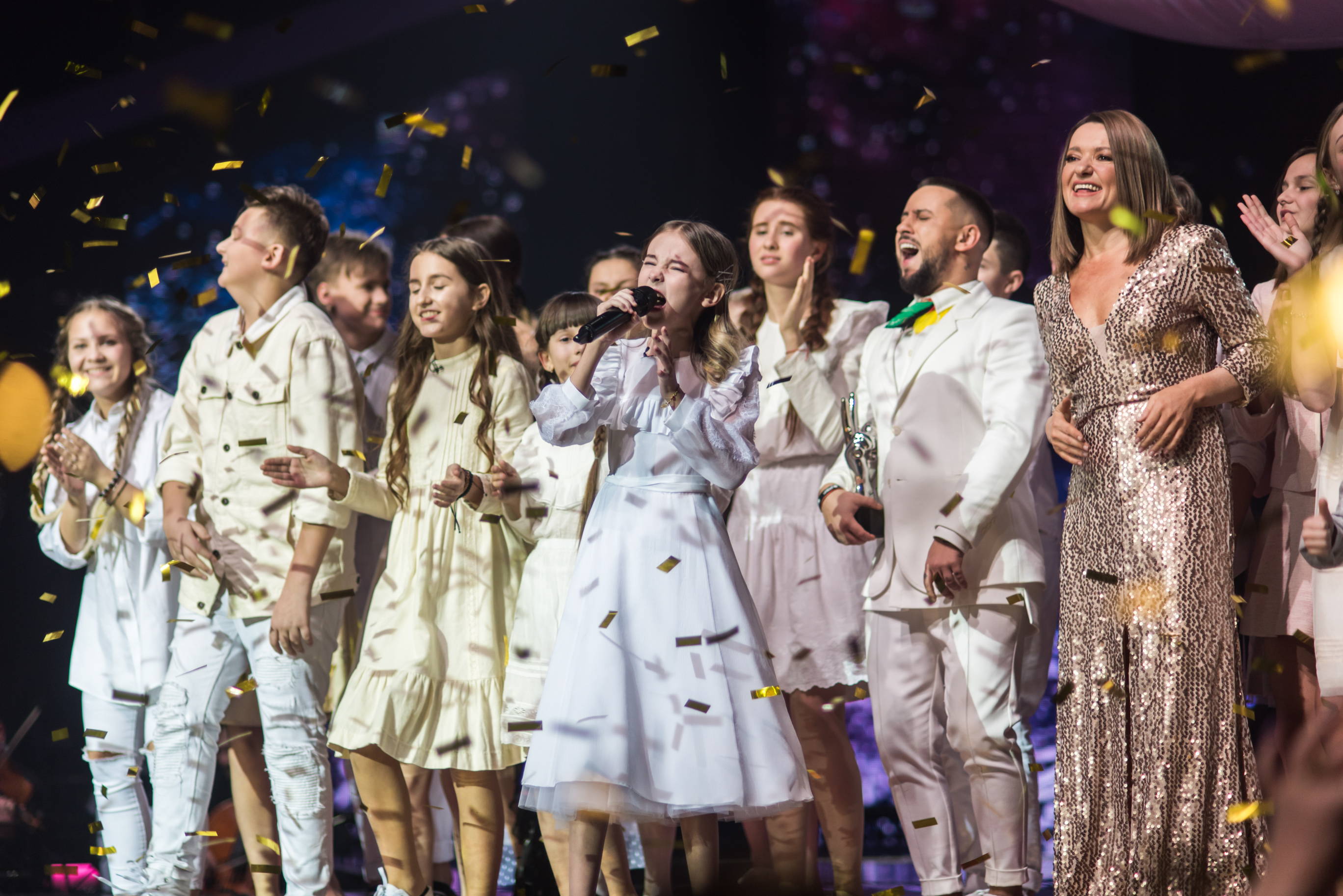
Tuleshova performing after winning The Voice Kids Ukraine.

In January 2017, Tuleshova took part in the international singing competition, Hopes of Europe, where she won the grand prize. Later that same year, she auditioned for season 4 of The Voice Kids Ukraine. During the Blind Auditions, she performed Demi Lovato's song "Stone Cold". All three coaches; Monatik, Natalia Mohylevska and Vremya i Steklo, "turned their chairs" for her; she chose Monatik. After passing all the stages, she made it to the grand final. There, she performed the song "Ne tvoya viyna" and was ultimately announced as the winner of the competition at 10 years old. At the time, she was the first non-Ukrainian to win, but in 2019, Georgian singer Oleksandr Zazarashvyli won the fifth season.

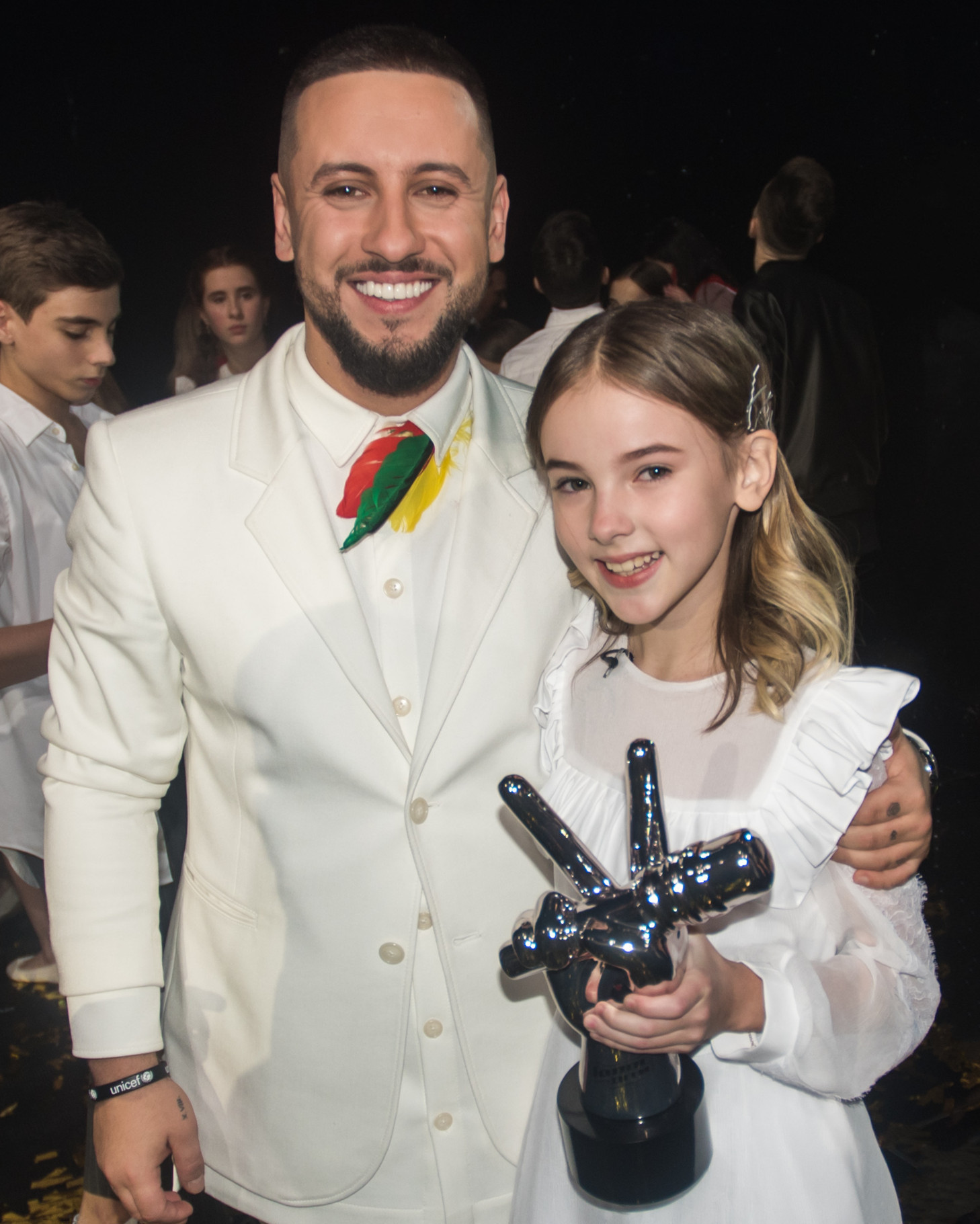
Daneliya wins The Voice Kids Ukraine (with her coach Monatik).

In March 2018, Tuleshova won the Glimpse into the Future Award at the first International Professional Music Premium Bravo Awards in Moscow. After receiving her award, alongside French singer Zaz, she performed "Je veux".

On 22 September 2018, she was selected to represent Kazakhstan in the Junior Eurovision Song Contest 2018 in Minsk, Belarus with the song "Ózińe sen", written by Tuleshova, Artyom Kuz'menkov and Kamila Dairova and composed by Ivan Lopukhov. In the final, she performed third, following Portugal's Rita Laranjeira and preceding Albania's Efi Gjika. At the end of the voting she had received 171 points, 68 points from the international juries and 103 points from the public vote, and finished in sixth place. An English version of "Ózińe sen", titled Seize the Time, was released on 21 October 2018.

=== 2019: The World's Best ===
In 2019, Tuleshova auditioned for the American TV talent show The World's Best, performing the song "Rise Up", originally performed by Andra Day. In the battle rounds, she beat Japan's Manami Ito to qualify to the champion rounds. There, she performed "What About Us" but was ultimately eliminated from the competition, placing in the top 8.

=== 2020: Da NeL and America's Got Talent ===
In 2020, Daneliya was scheduled to have a concert in Texas, United States. However, this was cancelled due to the COVID-19 pandemic.

In February 2020, during an interview with Kazakh TV channel Gakku TV, Daneliya announced that she would launch a new music project under the stage name "Da NeL". Her first single as "Da NeL" premiered on YouTube on 4 February 2020. Her second single, "Мой день" ("My Day") premiered in April 2020. Succeeding singles, "OMG" and "FIRE", respectively premiered in May and June 2020.

In June, she auditioned for America's Got Talent singing "Tears of Gold" by Faouzia and passed with a yes from judges Simon Cowell, Sofia Vergara, Heidi Klum, and Howie Mandel. Her performance was praised by Faouzia, who described her voice and stage presence as "amazing". She advanced to the live shows, performing "Sign of the Times" by Harry Styles on the 18 August Quarterfinals. She advanced to the Semifinals via online public vote. She performed to "Who You Are" by Jessie J, and advanced to the Finals. For her final performance, she sang Sia's "Alive". She did not advance to the top 5 and ultimately placed 6th.

=== 2021: Signing with 4 Chords Records and further music releases ===
In May 2021 it was reported that Tuleshova was named Flagship Artist of American label '4 Chords Records'. Her first single with that label, "Like You Used To", gained over 100k on streaming platforms within days of its release.

== Personal life ==
Tuleshova graduated from Brookline High School in 2024.

== Discography ==
=== Extended plays ===
Title	Details
Trouble	Released: 14 April 2023; Label: Vanns Music Inc; Format: Digital download, Streaming
young love	Released: 13 February 2026; Label: Vanns Music Inc; Format: Digital download, Streaming

=== Singles ===
Year	Title	Language
2016	Космос (English: Cosmos)	Russian
2016	Другие (Romanized: Drugiye, English: Others)	Russian
2018	Ózińe sen (English: Seize the Time)	Kazakh, English
2018	Seize the Time (English-only Version of Ózińe sen)	English
2019	Mama	Kazakh
2019	Don't Cha	English
2020	ХЗЧЗДЗ (Romanized: KhZChZDZ, Nobody freakin' knows what the homework is) as Da NeL	Russian, English
2020	Glossy	English
2020	Мой день (English: My Day) as Da NeL	Russian, English, Kazakh
2020	OMG (as Da NeL)	Russian, English
2020	FIRE (as Da NeL)	Russian, English
2021	Like You Used To	English
2021	Lucky Me	English
2023	Tied	English
2023	Cynical	English
2024	it's only pain	English
2024	memories	English
2024	bye bye baby	English
2025	Paradise (with Pontifexx and Khouri)	English

== Live Performances ==
List of all live performances, showing event/venue names, dates, locations, and songs performed where applicable
Date	Event/Venue	City	Country	Performed song(s)	Ref(s)
October 13, 2024	Barboza	Seattle	United States	“Tears of Gold” by Faouzia; “Cardigan” by Taylor Swift; “Breathing” (Unreleased); "Young and Beautiful” by Lana Del Rey; “Memories”; “Tied”; “Wildflower” by Billie Eilish; “Stay” by Rihanna; “Back to Black” by Amy Winehouse; “I Miss you, I’m Sorry” by Gracie Abrams; “Northern Lights” (Unreleased); “bye bye baby”	

== Notes and references ==
Awards and achievements
Preceded by None	Kazakhstan in the Junior Eurovision Song Contest; 2018	Succeeded by Yerzhan Maksim with "Armanyńnan qalma"
