= Kazakhstan in the Junior Eurovision Song Contest =

- Junior Eurovision Song Contest
- Participating broadcaster: Khabar Agency (KA)

Participation summary
- Appearances: 5
- First appearance: 2018
- Last appearance: 2022
- Highest placement: 2nd: 2019, 2020
- Participation history: 2018; 2019; 2020; 2021; 2022; 2023 – 2025

External links
- Khabar Agency page
- For the most recent participation see Kazakhstan in the Junior Eurovision Song Contest 2022

Kazakhstan participated in the Junior Eurovision Song Contest from 2018 through 2022. The Kazakh participating broadcaster in the contest is Khabar Agency (KA), an associate member of the European Broadcasting Union (EBU). As an associate member, the broadcaster cannot apply to participate on its own and requires a special invitation from the contest reference group to take part. Its best result to date is second place, achieved in the 2019 and 2020 contests.

== History ==
=== 2013–2017: Before participation ===
On 25 November 2017, Channel 31 of Kazakhstan revealed their intention to participate in the Junior Eurovision Song Contest 2018. Initial claims emerged on 22 December 2017 from both the Kazakh Minister of Culture and Sports, Arystanbek Muhamediuly and the Director General of Channel 31, Bagdat Kodzhahmetov claiming that Kazakhstan had applied to become a member of the EBU, with the hope of participating both in the Eurovision Song Contest and the Junior Eurovision Song Contest. Kodzhahmetov invited Daneliya Tuleshova, winner of the fourth season of Ukraine's version of The Voice Kids, to take part in the casting process to represent Kazakhstan in the Junior Eurovision Song Contest. The next day, however, the EBU made a statement rejecting the possibility of Kazakhstan becoming an active member of the EBU, as Kazakhstan is neither within the European Broadcasting Area nor the Council of Europe.

Prior to this, Kazakhstan had sent a delegation to the 2013 and 2017 contests and broadcast the latter live. Channel 31 also stated its intention to broadcast the contest in 2018 and 2019. Khabar Agency has been an associate member of the European Broadcasting Union (EBU) since January 2016.

=== 2018–2022: Participation ===
On 25 July 2018, Kazakhstan's national broadcaster, Khabar Agency, announced that they would be making their Junior Eurovision debut at the 2018 contest in Minsk, Belarus. The country was represented by the song "Ózińe sen" performed by aforementioned Daneliya Tuleshova, placing sixth in a field of 20 songs with 171 points. It was announced on 18 July 2019 that Kazakhstan would participate in the 2019 contest in Gliwice. In late July 2019, Yerzhan Maksim was internally chosen as the second entrant for Kazakhstan. His song, "Armanyńnan qalma", ended up in 2nd place in a field of 19 countries, receiving 227 points. Maksim's success was repeated in the 2020 contest in Warsaw, where Karakat Bashanova, with the song "Forever", placed 2nd with 152 points. Kazakhstan was represented in the 2021 contest in Paris by Alinur Khamzin and Beknur Zhanibekuly with the song "Ertegı älemı (Fairy World)", which managed to achieve another top 10 result for the country: 8th place in a field of 19 countries, receiving 121 points. In 2022, David Charlin represented the country in Yerevan with the song "Jer-Ana (Mother Earth)". He could not repeat the success of his predecessors and went on to place 15th in a field of 16 countries, receiving 47 points. This was the worst result Kazakhstan had achieved since it first entered the contest, and also the first time the country had finished outside the Top 10.

=== 2023–present: Withdrawal ===
On 6 June 2023, Khabar Agency revealed that Kazakhstan would not participate in the Junior Eurovision Song Contest 2023 held in Nice, however, the broadcaster later expressed hope of returning in 2024. On 22 August 2024, the broadcaster confirmed that it would not return in 2024 because of financial constraints, in addition to the later start time of 18:00 CET, which would have taken place three hours ahead of Central European Time within the country. On 12 June 2025, Khabar Agency confirmed its non-participation for the third consecutive year, prior to the announcement of the participants list by the EBU, to instead focus on membership in the regular Eurovision Song Contest. On 29 November 2025, the Kazakh Ministry of Culture and Information stated that discussions with the EBU regarding their debut in the senior contest would take place in early 2026. However on 15 January 2026, Martin Green, the Executive Supervisor of the EBU, revealed that Kazakhstan would not be invited to take part in the Eurovision Song Contest 2026 because the deadline for applications had already passed. This followed rumours that Kazakhstan could be invited as a special guest similar to how Australia joined the contest in 2015. As of January 2026, Khabar Agency has not made any announcements regarding a return to the junior contest.

== Participation overview ==
Kazakhstan used the national selection format «Balalar Eurokörınısı» än baiqauyna ūlttyq ırıkteu (Kazakh Cyrillic: «Балалар Еурокөрінісі» ән байқауына ұлттық іріктеу; Russian: Национальный отбор на песенный конкурс «Детское Евровидение»; lit. 'National selection for the Junior Eurovision Song Contest') in 2018, 2020 and 2021, while in 2019 and 2022 their songs were internally selected; in the later year, the international children's contest Baqytty-bala (Kazakh Cyrillic: «Бақытты-бала»; lit. 'Happy child') selected its representative.

Table key
2	Second place

Year	Artist	Song	Language	Place	Points
2018	Daneliya Tuleshova	"Òzińe sen" (Өзіңе сен)	Kazakh, English	6	171
2019	Yerzhan Maksim	"Armanyńnan qalma" (Арманыңнан қалма)	Kazakh, English	2	227
2020	Karakat Bashanova	"Forever"	Kazakh, English	2	152
2021	Alinur Khamzin and Beknur Zhanibekuly	"Ertegı älemı (Fairy World)" (Ертегі әлемі)	Kazakh, French	8	121
2022	David Charlin	"Jer-Ana (Mother Earth)" (Жер-Ана)	Kazakh, English	15	47

== Commentators and spokespersons ==
Year	Channel	Commentator	Spokesperson	Ref.
2017	Channel 31	Unknown	Did not participate	
2018	Khabar 24	Mahabbat Esen (Russian); Kaldybek Zhaisanbai (Kazakh)	Aruzhan Khafiz	
2019	Khabar	Mahabbat Esen (Russian); Kaldybek Zhaisanbai (Kazakh)	Aruzhan Khafiz	
2020	Khabar	Mahabbat Esen (Russian); Kaldybek Zhaisanbai (Kazakh)	Saniya Zholzhaksyn	
2021	Khabar	Mahabbat Esen (Russian); Kaldybek Zhaisanbai (Kazakh)	Zere Kabdolla	
2022	Khabar	Yerdana Yerzhuanuly and Dinara Sadu	Hallash	
2023	Khabar	Yerdana Yerzhuanuly and Dinara Sadu	Did not participate	
2024–2026	No broadcast		Did not participate	N/A

== See also ==
- Kazakhstan in the ABU TV Song Festival – A televised song gala organised by the Asia-Pacific Broadcasting Union (ABU).
