= Israel in the Junior Eurovision Song Contest 2018 =

- Junior Eurovision Song Contest 2018
- Country: Israel
- Selection process: Artist: Kdam Eurovision Junior; Song: Internal selection
- Selection date: Artist: 6 September 2018; Song: 8 October 2018

Competing entry
- Song: "Children Like These"
- Artist: Noam Dadon
- Songwriters: Eden Hason

Placement
- Final result: 14th, 81 points

Participation chronology

Israel was represented at the Junior Eurovision Song Contest 2018 which took place on 25 November 2018, in Minsk, Belarus. The Israeli broadcaster Israeli Public Broadcasting Corporation (KAN) was responsible for organising their entry for the contest. This is Israel's third appearance at the Junior Eurovision Song Contest.

== Background ==
Prior to the 2018 contest, Israel had participated in the Junior Eurovision Song Contest twice since its debut in 2012, represented by the group Kids.il, who performed the song "Let the Music Win", which finished in eighth place achieving a score of sixty-eight points. They briefly returned in 2016 with Shir & Tim singing "Follow My Heart" before withdrawing again in 2017. Israel has previously shown interest to take part in the 2004 and 2008 contests, although no reasons were ever published to detail the change of interest.

The EBU published the final list of participating countries on 2 August 2018, in which Israel appeared within the participating list for the contest which takes place on 25 November 2018, in Minsk, Belarus.

== Before Junior Eurovision ==
=== Kdam Eurovision Junior ===
The singer who performed the Israeli entry for the Junior Eurovision Song Contest 2018 was selected through the singing competition Kdam Eurovision Junior ("Pre Junior Eurovision").

The Israeli broadcaster opened a call for performers for their 2018 Junior Eurovision national selection in August 2018. The candidates took part in live auditions, held in the last week of August, where an expert committee selected the 6 participants that participated at the national final to perform cover songs. The show took place on 6 September 2018 at the Russel Theatre in Ramat Gan, hosted by Yaron Rubinsky and Roni Dalumi, but was broadcast on 2 October 2018 on Kan 11 and Kan Educational. After all of the covers were performed by the competing artists, the contestants sang the four Israeli winning songs of the Eurovision Song Contest: "A-Ba-Ni-Bi" (1978), "Hallelujah" (1979), "Diva" (1998) and "Toy" (2018). Noam Dadon was selected by a jury panel consisting of former Eurovision representatives Yardena Arazi (1976 and 1988), Lior Narkis (2003), and singer Hanan Ben Ari, with the split results of the competition never being published.

| Draw | Artist | Song (Original artists) |
|---|---|---|
| 1 | Lian Biran | "La Vita è Bella" (Nicola Piovani) |
| 2 | Adar Kagan | "Od me'at" (Ehud Banai) |
| 3 | Michaela Sher | "Vienna" (Billy Joel) |
| 4 | Romi Netz | "Na'im achshav" (Elai Botner & The Outside Kids) |
| 5 | Roni Meduel | "Arms" (Christina Perri) |
| 6 | Noam Dadon | "Me'kha'ke" (Rita) |

=== Song selection ===
After Dadon's win, KAN launched an open call for the song, and members of the Society of Authors, Composers and Music Publishers in Israel could submit their entries until 12 September. On 7 October, a 35-second snippet of the song "Children Like These (Yelaad’im Kaeele)" was published, containing the chorus. The official music video and the full song were published a day later on the official YouTube channel of Kan Educational. The entry was entirely in Hebrew. The song was written and composed by Eden Hason.

== At Junior Eurovision ==
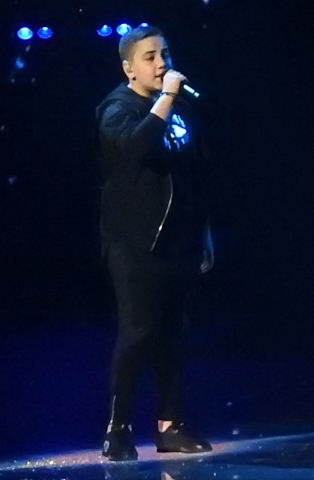
Dadon performing at the Junior Eurovision Song Contest 2018.

During the opening ceremony and the running order draw which both took place on 19 November 2018, Israel was drawn to perform fourteenth on 25 November 2018, following Georgia and preceding France.

=== Voting ===
The same voting system that was introduced in the 2017 edition was used, where the results were determined by 50% online voting and 50% jury voting. Every participating broadcaster assembled a national jury that consisted of three music industry professionals and two children aged between 10 and 15 who were citizens of the country they represented. The rankings of those jurors were combined to make an overall top ten.

The online voting consisted of two phases. The first phase of the online voting began on 23 November 2018 when a recap of all the rehearsal performances was shown on the contest's website Junioreurovision.tv before the viewers could vote. After this, voters also had the option to watch longer one-minute clips from each participant's rehearsal. This first round of voting ended on 25 November at 15:59 CET. The second phase of the online voting took place during the live show and began right after the last performance and was open for 15 minutes. International viewers were able to vote for a minimum of three and a maximum of five songs. They were also able to vote for their own country's song. These votes were then turned into points which were determined by the percentage of votes received. For example, if a song received 10% of the votes, it received 10% of the available points.

Points awarded to Israel
| Score | Country |
|---|---|
| 12 points | |
| 10 points | |
| 8 points | |
| 7 points | Kazakhstan |
| 6 points | Italy |
| 5 points | Russia |
| 4 points | Ukraine |
| 3 points | Malta; Portugal |
| 2 points | France; Poland |
| 1 point | Albania; Netherlands |
Israel received 47 points from the online vote

Points awarded by Israel
| Score | Country |
|---|---|
| 12 points | Georgia |
| 10 points | Malta |
| 8 points | Ukraine |
| 7 points | Italy |
| 6 points | Poland |
| 5 points | Russia |
| 4 points | Armenia |
| 3 points | Netherlands |
| 2 points | Australia |
| 1 point | France |

==== Detailed voting results ====
The following members comprised the Israeli jury:

- Aya Korem
- Avi Greinik
- Eviatar Leket
- Imri Ziv – represented Israel in the Eurovision Song Contest 2017
- Michaela Sher

Detailed voting results from Israel
| Draw | Country | Juror A | Juror B | Juror C | Juror D | Juror E | Rank | Points |
|---|---|---|---|---|---|---|---|---|
| 01 | Ukraine | 2 | 3 | 3 | 3 | 5 | 3 | 8 |
| 02 | Portugal | 17 | 18 | 19 | 16 | 17 | 18 | |
| 03 | Kazakhstan | 14 | 11 | 18 | 8 | 12 | 13 | |
| 04 | Albania | 15 | 13 | 17 | 11 | 16 | 15 | |
| 05 | Russia | 6 | 8 | 6 | 5 | 8 | 6 | 5 |
| 06 | Netherlands | 8 | 9 | 5 | 9 | 6 | 8 | 3 |
| 07 | Azerbaijan | 9 | 12 | 13 | 10 | 13 | 11 | |
| 08 | Belarus | 16 | 14 | 15 | 18 | 15 | 16 | |
| 09 | Ireland | 18 | 17 | 14 | 17 | 18 | 17 | |
| 10 | Serbia | 19 | 19 | 12 | 19 | 19 | 19 | |
| 11 | Italy | 5 | 2 | 2 | 4 | 4 | 4 | 7 |
| 12 | Australia | 11 | 5 | 7 | 6 | 10 | 9 | 2 |
| 13 | Georgia | 1 | 6 | 1 | 2 | 1 | 1 | 12 |
| 14 | Israel | | | | | | | |
| 15 | France | 13 | 7 | 9 | 7 | 11 | 10 | 1 |
| 16 | Macedonia | 10 | 15 | 10 | 15 | 9 | 12 | |
| 17 | Armenia | 7 | 4 | 8 | 12 | 7 | 7 | 4 |
| 18 | Wales | 12 | 16 | 16 | 13 | 14 | 14 | |
| 19 | Malta | 4 | 1 | 4 | 1 | 2 | 2 | 10 |
| 20 | Poland | 3 | 10 | 11 | 14 | 3 | 5 | 6 |
