= Wales in the Junior Eurovision Song Contest 2018 =

- Junior Eurovision Song Contest 2018
- Participating broadcaster: Sianel Pedwar Cymru (S4C)
- Country: Wales
- Selection process: Song: Internal selection Artist: Chwilio am Seren
- Selection date: 9 October 2018

Competing entry
- Song: "Perta"
- Artist: Manw
- Songwriter: Ywain Gwynedd

Placement
- Final result: 20th (last), 29 points

Participation chronology

Wales was represented at the Junior Eurovision Song Contest 2018 with the song "Hi yw y Berta", written by Ywain Gwynedd, and performed by Manw. The Welsh participating broadcaster, Sianel Pedwar Cymru (S4C), selected the song internally and the performer through the televised national final Chwilio am Seren.

== Background ==
Sianel Pedwar Cymru (S4C) announced on 9 May 2018 that it would debut at the Junior Eurovision Song Contest 2018 representing Wales. The broadcaster held a televised national selection process, Chwilio am Seren (English: Search for a Star), to select its entry.

Between 2003 and 2005, ITV had participated in the Junior Eurovision Song Contest representing the United Kingdom as a whole, which includes Wales. S4C had also shown interest in participating in the 2008 contest, but in the end decided against participating.

== Before Junior Eurovision ==
=== Chwilio am Seren ===
Chwilio am Seren (Search for a Star) was the national selection process that was used to select the 2018 entrant. Auditions took place at Venue Cymru in Llandudno, Aberystwyth Arts Centre and at Cardiff's Wales Millennium Centre during June 2018 with mentors Connie Fisher, Stifyn Parri and Tara Bethan as the judging panel. The four-part series, produced by Rondo Media for S4C, was aired on Tuesday nights with a repeat broadcast on Saturday afternoons.

The first two shows covered the nationwide auditions. Following a masterclass round at Llandaff's Memorial Hall (part of The Cathedral School), the final twenty singers were whittled down to the top 12 who then performed in public at Quadrant Shopping Centre in Swansea. The jury decided at the end of these performances who would perform during a final round live on television.

Table key

Qualifier

Top 12 artists – 2 October 2018
R/O	Artist	Song (performed in Welsh)	Mentor
1	Lily Mai Duncan	"Rise like a Phoenix"	Fisher
2	Tiah	"Symphony"	Parri
3	Emma Kennedy	"Bwgi"	Bethan
4	Iestyn Gwin Jones	"Byw Fel Brenin"	Bethan
5	Amelia Francis	"Calon"	Fisher
6	Gracie Jayne Fitzgerald	"You're My World"	Parri
7	Manw Lili Robin	"Ysbryd Efnisien"	Bethan
8	Ella Georgia Thomas	"And I Am Telling You I'm Not Going"	Fisher
9	Manon	"What About Us"	Parri
10	Misha Parry	"Llygad Ebrill"	Bethan
11	Lauren Price	"Hold My Hand"	Parri
12	Lauren Mia Jones	"The Voice Within"	Fisher

==== National final ====
The national final took place in Llandudno's Venue Cymru on 9 October 2018, hosted by Trystan Ellis-Morris and broadcast live on S4C. The first round saw the six live finalists performing cover songs. Regional juries (Aberystwyth, Llandudno, Carmarthen, Cardiff and London) consisting of two adults and two children awarded stars (points) to their favourite three performers which were announced by a spokesperson. The three mentors, Fisher, Parri and Bethan all gave their opinions on the performances but could not vote. In the second round, the three superfinalists each performed a different arrangement (folk ballad, funky pop, piano ballad) of the official Welsh entry "Hi yw y Berta", written by Ywain Gwynedd. The televote alone selected the winner from the second round, this being Manw.

The national final opened with a performance by the six finalists, performing a Welsh version of the anthem of the Junior Eurovision Song Contest 2017, "Shine Bright". During the televote window, a summary of the various winners of the Junior Eurovision Song Contest was broadcast.

Final – 9 October 2018
R/O	Artist	Song (original artists)	Stars	Place	Result
1	Ella Georgia Thomas	"Hallelujah" (Leonard Cohen)	5/5 stars	1	Superfinalist
2	Gracie-Jayne Fitzgerald	"Rhywbeth o'i le" (Huw Chiswell)	2/5 stars	4	Eliminated
3	Lily Mai Duncan	"Adre" (Caryl Parry Jones)	3/5 stars	3	Superfinalist
4	Manw Lili Robin	"Fy nghariad gwyn" (Ywain Gwynedd)	4/5 stars	2	Superfinalist
5	Lauren Mia Jones	"Angel" (Elin Fflur)	0/5 stars	6	Eliminated
6	Misha Parry	"O Gymru" (Rhys Jones (m.), Leslie Harris (l.))	2/5 stars	4	Eliminated

Detailed Regional Jury Votes
Artist	Aberystwyth	Llandudno	Cardiff	London	Carmarthen	Total
Ella Georgia Thomas	X	X		X	X	4
Gracie-Jayne Fitzgerald	X		X			2
Lily Mai Duncan		X	X		X	3
Manw Lili Robin	X	X		X	X	4
Lauren Mia Jones						0
Misha Parry			X	X		2

Superfinal – 9 October 2018
R/O	Artist	Song
1	Manw Lili Robin	"Hi yw y Berta"
2	Ella Georgia Tomas	"Hi yw y Berta"
3	Lily Mai Duncan	"Hi yw y Berta"

==== Ratings ====
Combined viewing figures by show
Show	Date	Viewers (in thousands)	Ref.
Auditions 1	18 September 2018	19	
Auditions 2	25 September 2018	16	
Top 12	2 October 2018	18	
Final	9 October 2018	22	

== Artist and song information ==
=== Manw ===
Manw
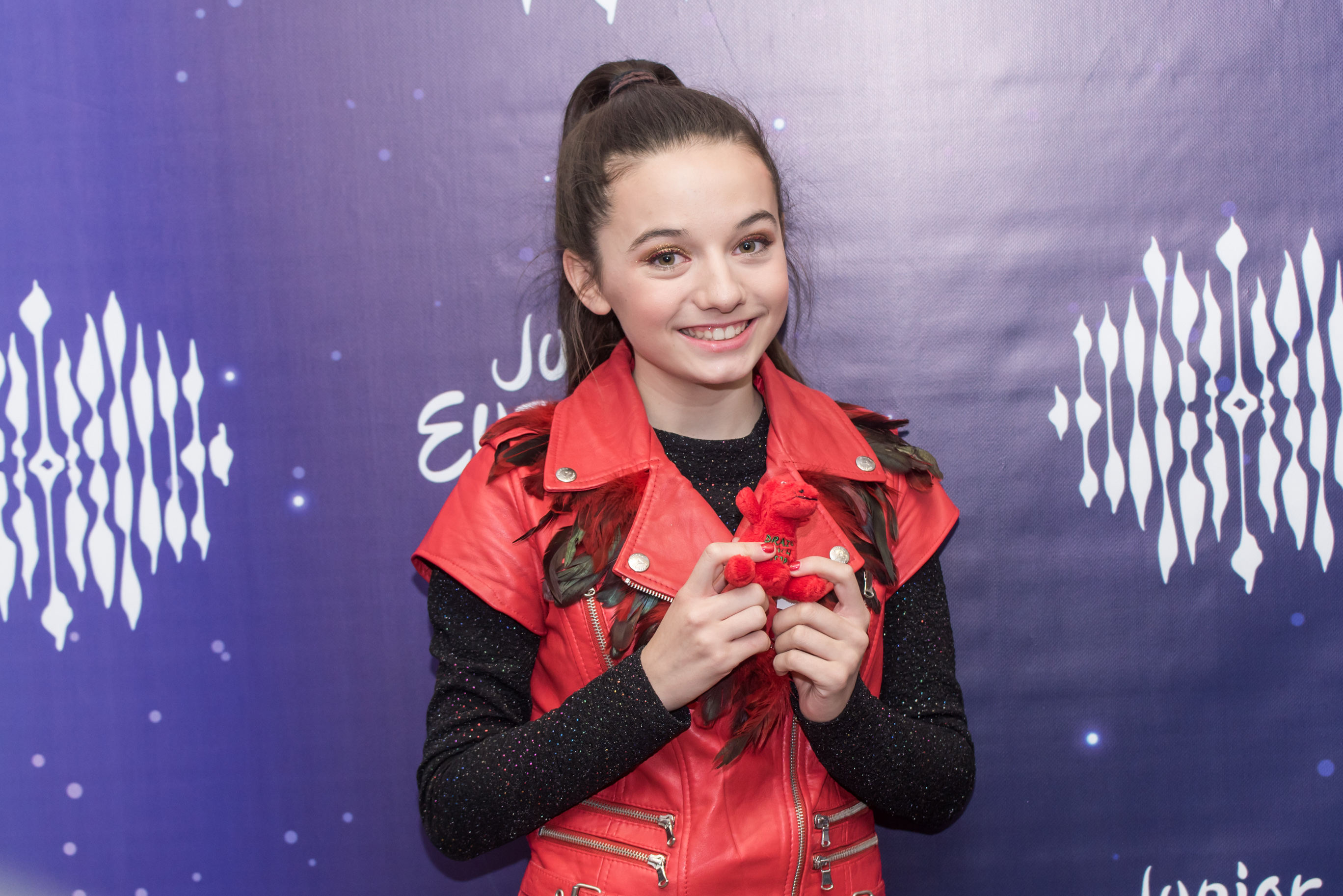

Background information
- Born: Manw Lili Robin; 2004 (age 21–22); Rhosgadfan, Gwynedd, North Wales, United Kingdom
- Occupation: Singer
- Instrument: Vocals
- Years active: 2014–present

Manw Lili Robin (born circa 2004) is a Welsh singer from Rhosgadfan in Gwynedd, North Wales. She represented Wales at the Junior Eurovision Song Contest 2018 with the song "Perta".

She performed at the National Eisteddfod of Wales and Urdd National Eisteddfod a number of times, most recently in 2017, and attends Ysgol Glanaethwy in Bangor. In 2014, Manw played the part of Awen in the Welsh version of the animated film, The Secret of Kells (Cyfrinach Llyfr Kells) which was broadcast on S4C on 24 May. In 2015, Manw was a member of the Welsh choir Cor Glanaethwy, who reached the live finals of Britain's Got Talent.

On 23 November, S4C broadcast a 30-minute documentary Manw yn Minsk, which followed her journey to the contest.

=== Perta ===
(Wales) "Perta"
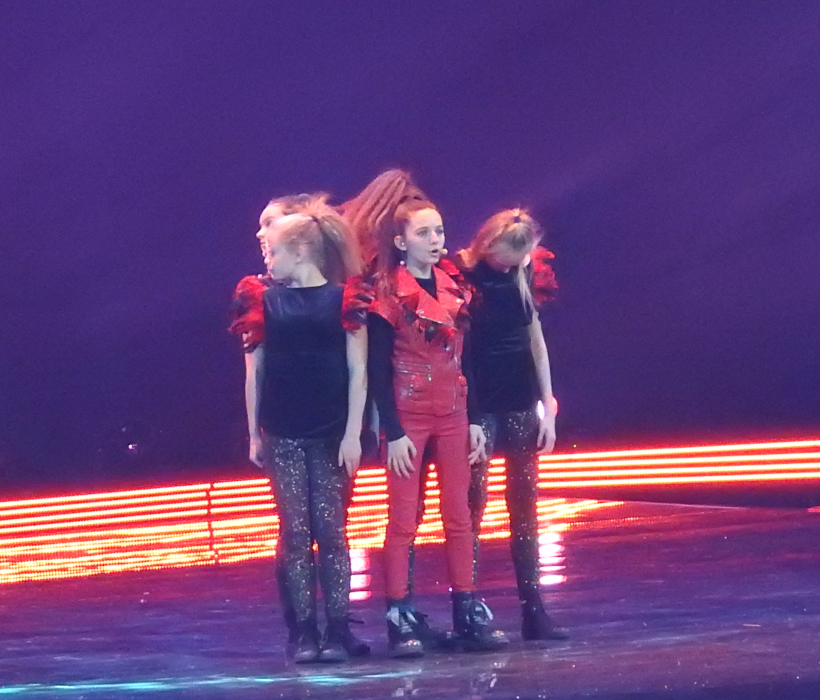

Junior Eurovision Song Contest 2018 entry
- Country: Wales
- Artist: Manw Lili Robin
- As: Manw
- Language: Welsh
- Composers: Ywain Gwynedd, Ifan Siôn Davies, Richard James Hooson Roberts
- Lyricist: Ywain Gwynedd

Finals performance
- Final result: 20th
- Final points: 29

Entry chronology
- "Calon yn Curo" (2019) ►

"Perta" (originally called "Hi yw y Berta", later "Berta") is a song performed by Welsh singer Manw. It represented Wales at the Junior Eurovision Song Contest 2018. The song underwent a revamp ahead of the contest in Minsk, with the official music video released on 16 October. Ywain Gwynedd stated in an interview that the lyrics were written with a focus on sounding nice to non-Welsh speakers, with a repetitive chorus that was easy for viewers to sing along to. The song finished in 20th place with 29 points.

== At Junior Eurovision ==
During the opening ceremony and the running order draw which both took place on 19 November 2018, Wales was drawn to perform eighteenth on 25 November 2018, following Armenia and preceding Malta.

The final was broadcast live in Wales on S4C, with commentary provided by Trystan Ellis-Morris in Welsh. English commentary by Stifyn Parri was available via the red button. It was the joint 14th most watched show that week on S4C with 23,000 viewers.

=== Voting ===
The same voting system that was introduced in the 2017 edition was used, where the results were determined by 50% online voting and 50% jury voting. Every participating broadcaster assembled a national jury that consisted of three music industry professionals and two children aged between 10 and 15 who were citizens of the country they represented. The rankings of those jurors were combined to make an overall top ten.

The online voting consisted of two phases. The first phase of the online voting began on 23 November 2018 when a recap of all the rehearsal performances was shown on the contest's website Junioreurovision.tv before the viewers could vote. After this, voters also had the option to watch longer one-minute clips from each participant's rehearsal. This first round of voting ended on 25 November at 15:59 CET. The second phase of the online voting took place during the live show and began right after the last performance and was open for 15 minutes. International viewers were able to vote for a minimum of three and a maximum of five songs. They were also able to vote for their own country's song. These votes were then turned into points which were determined by the percentage of votes received. For example, if a song received 10% of the votes, it received 10% of the available points. In the contest, Wales received no points from the professional juries; they received 29 points from the online vote.

Points awarded by Wales
Score	Country
12 points	Australia
10 points	Georgia
8 points	Malta
7 points	Russia
6 points	Poland
5 points	Ukraine
4 points	Macedonia
3 points	Azerbaijan
2 points	Albania
1 point	Netherlands

==== Detailed voting results ====
Detailed voting results from Wales
Draw	Country	Juror A	Juror B	Juror C	Juror D	Juror E	Rank	Points
01	Ukraine	6	3	7	10	15	6	5
02	Portugal	10	17	14	5	16	13	
03	Kazakhstan	18	9	19	17	17	17	
04	Albania	7	13	5	13	8	9	2
05	Russia	2	1	2	11	5	4	7
06	Netherlands	8	12	9	6	11	10	1
07	Azerbaijan	9	6	12	8	7	8	3
08	Belarus	17	14	16	19	10	16	
09	Ireland	12	16	17	16	14	15	
10	Serbia	14	11	10	15	13	14	
11	Italy	16	8	13	9	12	12	
12	Australia	1	2	4	1	3	1	12
13	Georgia	3	5	3	2	1	2	10
14	Israel	11	19	18	14	19	18	
15	France	15	15	8	7	9	11	
16	Macedonia	13	10	6	12	4	7	4
17	Armenia	19	18	15	18	18	19	
18	Wales							
19	Malta	4	4	1	4	2	3	8
20	Poland	5	7	11	3	6	5	6
