= Georgia in the Junior Eurovision Song Contest 2018 =

- Junior Eurovision Song Contest 2018
- Country: Georgia
- Selection process: Artist: Ranina; Song: Internal selection
- Selection date: Artist: 18 May 2018; Song: 9 October 2018

Competing entry
- Song: "Your Voice"
- Artist: Tamar Edilashvili
- Songwriters: Aleksandre Lordkipanidze; Sopho Toroshelidze

Placement
- Final result: 8th, 144 points

Participation chronology

Georgia was represented at the Junior Eurovision Song Contest 2018 which was held on 25 November 2018 in Minsk, Belarus.

== Background ==
Prior to the 2017 Contest, Georgia had participated in the Junior Eurovision Song Contest ten times since its debut in 2007, and since then they have never missed a single contest. Georgia is also the most successful country in the competition, with three victories in 2008, 2011 and 2016.

== Before Junior Eurovision ==
=== Ranina ===
Georgia used an original children's talent show format for the first time, Ranina (Georgian: რანინა), as the selection method for their artist. Starting on 2 March 2018, the show lasted around two months with ten candidate artists.

==== Contestants ====
Contestant	Age (Note: As of early 2018, when the participants list was released.)	Final place	Episode of elimination
Tamar Edilashvili თამარ ედილაშვილი	12 years old	Winner	N/A
Nikoloz Vasadze ნიქოლოზ ვასაძე	10 years old	2nd place	Grand Finale
Anastasia Togonidze ანასთასია თოგონიძე	12 years old	3rd place	Grand Finale
Davit Kimeridze დავით ქიმერიძე	12 years old	4th place	After Semi-final
Alexandre Zazarashvili ალექსანდრე ზაზარაშვილი	11 years old	5th place	After Semi-final
Giorgi Tsiskadze გიორგი ცისაქაძე	13 years old	6th place	After Round 4
Maria-Elene Bezhashvili მარია-ელენე ბეჟაშვილი	12 years old	7th place	After Round 4
Mariam Saginashvili მარიამ საგინაშვილი	12 years old	8th place	After Round 4
Nikoloz Gogichaishvili ნიქოლოზ გოგიჩაიშვილი	13 years old	9th place	After Round 4
Nita Jakhua ნითა ჯახუა	12 years old	10th place	After Round 4

==== Round 1 (2 – 9 March 2018) ====
The jurors for this round were Davit Evgenidze, Natalia Kutateladze and Beka Gochiashvili.

Show 1 (2 March 2018) Guest artist: SALIO
Draw	Artist	Song	Jury scores												Final score
Draw	Artist	Song	D. Evgenidze				N. Kutateladze				B. Gochiashvili				Final score
1	Giorgi Tsiskadze	"Varskvlavebi" (ვარსკვლავები)	36				39				40				115
1	Giorgi Tsiskadze	"Varskvlavebi" (ვარსკვლავები)	9	9	9	9	9	10	10	10	10	10	10	10	115
2	Nita Jakhua	"Mze" (მზე)	39				39				38				116
2	Nita Jakhua	"Mze" (მზე)	9	10	10	10	9	10	10	10	9	9	10	10	116
3	Nikoloz Vasadze	"Gaivlis Dro" (გაივლის დრო)	40				40				40				120
3	Nikoloz Vasadze	"Gaivlis Dro" (გაივლის დრო)	10	10	10	10	10	10	10	10	10	10	10	10	120
4	Nikoloz Gogichaishvili	"Rats Khvelaze Dzalian Gikhvars" (რაც ყველაზე ძალიან გიყვარს)	40				39				38				117
4	Nikoloz Gogichaishvili	"Rats Khvelaze Dzalian Gikhvars" (რაც ყველაზე ძალიან გიყვარს)	10	10	10	10	9	10	10	10	10	9	9	10	117
5	Tamar Edilashvili	"Lale" (ლალე)	40				40				40				120
5	Tamar Edilashvili	"Lale" (ლალე)	10	10	10	10	10	10	10	10	10	10	10	10	120

Show 2 (9 March 2018) Guest artist: Niaz Diasamidze
Draw	Artist	Song	Jury scores												Final score
Draw	Artist	Song	D. Evgenidze				N. Kutateladze				B. Gochiashvili				Final score
1	Maria-Elene Bezhashvili	"Mezghvauris Simghera" (მეზღვაურის სიმღერა)	39				38				38				115
1	Maria-Elene Bezhashvili	"Mezghvauris Simghera" (მეზღვაურის სიმღერა)	9	10	10	10	9	9	10	10	9	10	9	10	115
2	Mariam Saginashvili	"Kari Kris" (ქარი ქრის)	40				40				40				120
2	Mariam Saginashvili	"Kari Kris" (ქარი ქრის)	10	10	10	10	10	10	10	10	10	10	10	10	120
3	Davit Kimeridze	"Nami Vels (ნამი ველს)	40				39				39				118
3	Davit Kimeridze	"Nami Vels (ნამი ველს)	10	10	10	10	9	10	10	10	9	10	10	10	118
4	Anastasia Togonidze	"Dro" (დრო)	40				40				40				120
4	Anastasia Togonidze	"Dro" (დრო)	10	10	10	10	10	10	10	10	10	10	10	10	120
5	Alexandre Zazarashvili	"Sakhli" (სახლი)	40				40				40				120
5	Alexandre Zazarashvili	"Sakhli" (სახლი)	10	10	10	10	10	10	10	10	10	10	10	10	120

==== Round 2 (16 – 23 March 2018) ====
The jurors for this round were Liza Bagrationi, Kakha Tolordava and Sophie Villy.

Show 3 (16 March 2018)
Draw	Artist	Song	Jury scores												Final score
Draw	Artist	Song	L. Bagrationi				K. Tolordava				S. Villy				Final score
1	Tamar Edilashvili	"Circle Of Life" (The Lion King)	36				35				40				111
1	Tamar Edilashvili	"Circle Of Life" (The Lion King)	10	9	8	9	9	9	8	9	10	10	10	10	111
2	Nikoloz Gogichaishvili	"Where Is Love" (Oliver!)	36				36				37				109
2	Nikoloz Gogichaishvili	"Where Is Love" (Oliver!)	10	8	9	9	10	10	7	9	10	9	9	9	109
3	Nikoloz Vasadze	"Bare Necessities" (The Jungle Book)	40				40				40				120
3	Nikoloz Vasadze	"Bare Necessities" (The Jungle Book)	10	10	10	10	10	10	10	10	10	10	10	10	120
4	Nita Jakhua	"Wouldn't It Be Loverly" (My Fair Lady)	36				35				38				109
4	Nita Jakhua	"Wouldn't It Be Loverly" (My Fair Lady)	9	9	9	9	9	9	8	9	9	10	9	10	109
5	Giorgi Tsiskadze	"Go To The Distance" (Hercules)	36				39				40				115
5	Giorgi Tsiskadze	"Go To The Distance" (Hercules)	9	8	9	10	10	10	9	10	10	10	10	10	115

Show 4 (23 March 2018)
Draw	Artist	Song	Jury scores												Final score
Draw	Artist	Song	L. Bagrationi				K. Tolordava				S. Villy				Final score
1	Anastasia Togonidze	"Reflection" (Mulan)	39				36				39				114
1	Anastasia Togonidze	"Reflection" (Mulan)	10	9	10	10	10	9	8	9	10	10	9	10	114
2	Davit Kimeridze	"Can You Feel The Love Tonight" (The Lion King)	40				40				40				120
2	Davit Kimeridze	"Can You Feel The Love Tonight" (The Lion King)	10	10	10	10	10	10	10	10	10	10	10	10	120
3	Maria-Elene Bezhashvili	"Journey To The Past" (Anastasia)	37				37				38				112
3	Maria-Elene Bezhashvili	"Journey To The Past" (Anastasia)	10	9	8	10	10	9	8	10	10	9	9	10	112
4	Alexandre Zazarashvili	"Your Song" (Moulin Rouge!)	39				39				39				117
4	Alexandre Zazarashvili	"Your Song" (Moulin Rouge!)	10	10	9	10	10	10	9	10	10	10	9	10	117
5	Mariam Saginashvili	"Friends Like Me" (Aladdin)	38				37				37				112
5	Mariam Saginashvili	"Friends Like Me" (Aladdin)	10	9	9	10	9	9	9	10	9	9	9	10	112

==== Round 3 (30 March – 13 April 2018) ====
The jurors for this round were Buka Kartozia, Nino Katamadze and Zviad Bolkvadze.

Show 5 (30 March 2018) Guest artist: The Quintessence
Draw	Artist	Song	Jury scores												Final score
Draw	Artist	Song	B. Kartozia				N. Katamadze				Z. Bolkvadze				Final score
1	Nikoloz Gogichaishvili	"Chum Baghnarshi" (ჩუმ ბაღნარში)	33				36				35				104
1	Nikoloz Gogichaishvili	"Chum Baghnarshi" (ჩუმ ბაღნარში)	8	9	9	7	9	9	9	9	9	9	8	9	104
2	Tamar Edilashvili	"Tatris Gogona" (თათრის გოგონა)	36				36				36				108
2	Tamar Edilashvili	"Tatris Gogona" (თათრის გოგონა)	9	9	9	9	9	9	9	9	10	9	9	8	108
3	Giorgi Tsiskadze	"Iagundisa" (იაგუნდისა)	33				38				36				107
3	Giorgi Tsiskadze	"Iagundisa" (იაგუნდისა)	8	9	9	7	9	9	10	10	8	9	10	9	107
4	Nita Jakhua	"Sdzinavs T’bas" (სძინავს ტბას)	31				32				34				97
4	Nita Jakhua	"Sdzinavs T’bas" (სძინავს ტბას)	8	8	8	7	8	8	8	8	8	8	9	9	97
5	Nikoloz Vasadze	"Janaia" (ჯანაია)	39				39				38				116
5	Nikoloz Vasadze	"Janaia" (ჯანაია)	10	10	10	9	9	10	10	10	9	10	10	9	116

Show 6 (13 April 2018) Guest artist: The Quintessence
Draw	Artist	Song	Jury scores												Final score
Draw	Artist	Song	B. Kartozia				N. Katamadze				Z. Bolkvadze				Final score
1	Mariam Saginashvili	"K’rimanch’uli" (კრიმანჭული)	33				36				35				104
1	Mariam Saginashvili	"K’rimanch’uli" (კრიმანჭული)	8	9	9	7	9	9	9	9	9	8	9	9	104
2	Alexandre Zazarashvili	"Ai Balam, Balam" (აი ბალამ, ბალამ)	36				38				37				111
2	Alexandre Zazarashvili	"Ai Balam, Balam" (აი ბალამ, ბალამ)	9	9	10	8	9	9	10	10	8	9	10	10	111
3	Anastasia Togonidze	"Mze Shina Da Mze Gareta" (მზე შინა და მზე გარეთა)	38				39				34				111
3	Anastasia Togonidze	"Mze Shina Da Mze Gareta" (მზე შინა და მზე გარეთა)	10	10	9	9	10	10	9	10	8	9	9	8	111
4	Maria-Elene Bezhashvili	"Sach’idao" (საჭიდაო)	33				36				36				105
4	Maria-Elene Bezhashvili	"Sach’idao" (საჭიდაო)	8	9	8	8	9	9	9	9	10	8	9	9	105
5	Davit Kimeridze	"Vagipi" (ვაგიფი)	40				39				36				115
5	Davit Kimeridze	"Vagipi" (ვაგიფი)	10	10	10	10	10	10	10	9	9	9	9	9	115

==== Round 4 (20 – 27 April 2018) ====
The jurors for this round were Zaza Marjanishvili, Maia Datunashvili and Misha Mdinaradze.

Show 7 (20 April 2018) Songs by Paul McCartney
Draw	Artist	Song	Jury scores												Final score
Draw	Artist	Song	Z. Marjanishvili				M. Datunashvili				M. Mdinaradze				Final score
1	Nikoloz Vasadze	"Say, Say, Say"	40				40				39				119
1	Nikoloz Vasadze	"Say, Say, Say"	10	10	10	10	10	10	10	10	9	10	10	10	119
2	Giorgi Tsiskadze	"Yesterday"	40				39				39				118
2	Giorgi Tsiskadze	"Yesterday"	10	10	10	10	10	10	9	10	10	10	9	10	118
3	Nita Jakhua	"Penny Lane"	38				34				34				106
3	Nita Jakhua	"Penny Lane"	10	9	9	10	7	8	10	9	8	8	8	10	106
4	Nikoloz Gogichaishvili	"My Valentine"	36				40				39				115
4	Nikoloz Gogichaishvili	"My Valentine"	9	8	9	10	10	10	10	10	10	9	10	10	115
5	Tamar Edilashvili	"The Fool On The Hill"	40				40				40				120
5	Tamar Edilashvili	"The Fool On The Hill"	10	10	10	10	10	10	10	10	10	10	10	10	120

Show 8 (27 April 2018) Songs by Paul McCartney
Draw	Artist	Song	Jury scores												Final score
Draw	Artist	Song	Z. Marjanishvili				M. Datunashvili				M. Mdinaradze				Final score
1	Davit Kimeridze	"Let It Be"	40				39				38				117
1	Davit Kimeridze	"Let It Be"	10	10	10	10	10	9	10	10	9	9	10	10	117
2	Anastasia Togonidze	"Ebony & Ivory"	39				40				40				119
2	Anastasia Togonidze	"Ebony & Ivory"	10	9	10	10	10	10	10	10	10	10	10	10	119
3	Mariam Saginashvili	"Blackbird"	39				33				38				110
3	Mariam Saginashvili	"Blackbird"	10	9	10	10	8	8	8	9	9	9	10	10	110
4	Maria-Elene Bezhashvili	"Eleanor Rigby"	38				40				39				117
4	Maria-Elene Bezhashvili	"Eleanor Rigby"	9	9	10	10	10	10	10	10	9	10	10	10	117
5	Alexandre Zazarashvili	"Hey Jude"	40				40				39				119
5	Alexandre Zazarashvili	"Hey Jude"	10	10	10	10	10	10	10	10	9	10	10	10	119

At the end of Show 8, the semi-finalists were announced. The five participants who collected the most points throughout the four tours advanced to the next round. They are Alexandre Zazarashvili, Anastasia Togonidze, Davit Kimeridze, Nikoloz Vasadze, and Tamar Edilashvili.

==== Semi-final (4 – 11 May 2018) ====
The jurors for the first semi-final were Misha Mdinaradze, Sopho Khalvashi and Beka Gochiashvili.

Semi-final 1 (4 May 2018) Guest artist: Iriao
Draw	Artist	Song	Jury ranking after Semi-final 1		
Draw	Artist	Song	M. Mdinaradze	S. Khalvashi	B. Gochiashvili
1	Alexandre Zazarashvili	"ჩონგურს სიმები გავუბი" ("Chongurs Simebi Gavubi")	5th	4th	4th
2	Anastasia Togonidze	"მივალ გურიაში, მარა" ("Mival Guriashi, Mara")	2nd	5th	5th
3	Nikoloz Vasadze	"Take Five"	3rd	2nd	2nd
4	Davit Kimeridze	"ქალაქური მოტივები" ("Kalakuri Mot’ivebi")	4th	3rd	3rd
5	Tamar Edilashvili	"გზავნილი ყანჩელს" ("Gzavnili Q’anchels")	1st	1st	1st

The jurors for the second semi-final were Misha Mdinaradze, Sopho Toroshelidze and Beka Gochiashvili.

Semi-final 2 (11 May 2018) Songs by "The Jackson 5"
Draw	Artist	Song	Result
1	Nikoloz Vasadze	"I Want You Back"	2nd
2	Tamar Edilashvili	"I'll Be There"	1st
3	Davit Kimeridze	"Ben"	4th
4	Alexandre Zazarashvili	"Who's Loving You"	5th
5	Anastasia Togonidze	"I Wanna Be Where You Are"	3rd

==== Final (18 May 2018) ====
The jurors for the Final were Davit Evgenidze, Maia Datunashvili and David Malazonia.

Final (18 May 2018)
Draw	Artist	Song	Place
1	Anastasia Togonidze	"თოლიები" ("Toliebi")	Third place
2	Nikoloz Vasadze	"გზა სიარულმა დალია" ("Gza Siarulma Dalia")	Second place
3	Tamar Edilashvili	"მზეო, ლილეო" ("Mzeo, Lileo")	Winner

=== Song selection ===
On 6 July 2018, GPB opened a window for interested composers to submit their entries until 1 September. At the closing of the deadline, 22 submissions were received and assessed by a committee consisting of composer Davit Evgenidze, singers Sopho Khalvashi and Nodiko Tatishvili, director Zaza Orashvili, vocal coach Manana Morchiladze and Ranina creator Lana Kutateladze. The selected entry, "Your Voice", was written by Sopho Toroshelidze and Aleksandre Lortkipanidze, and was presented on 9 October.

== Artist and song information ==
Tamar Edilashvili
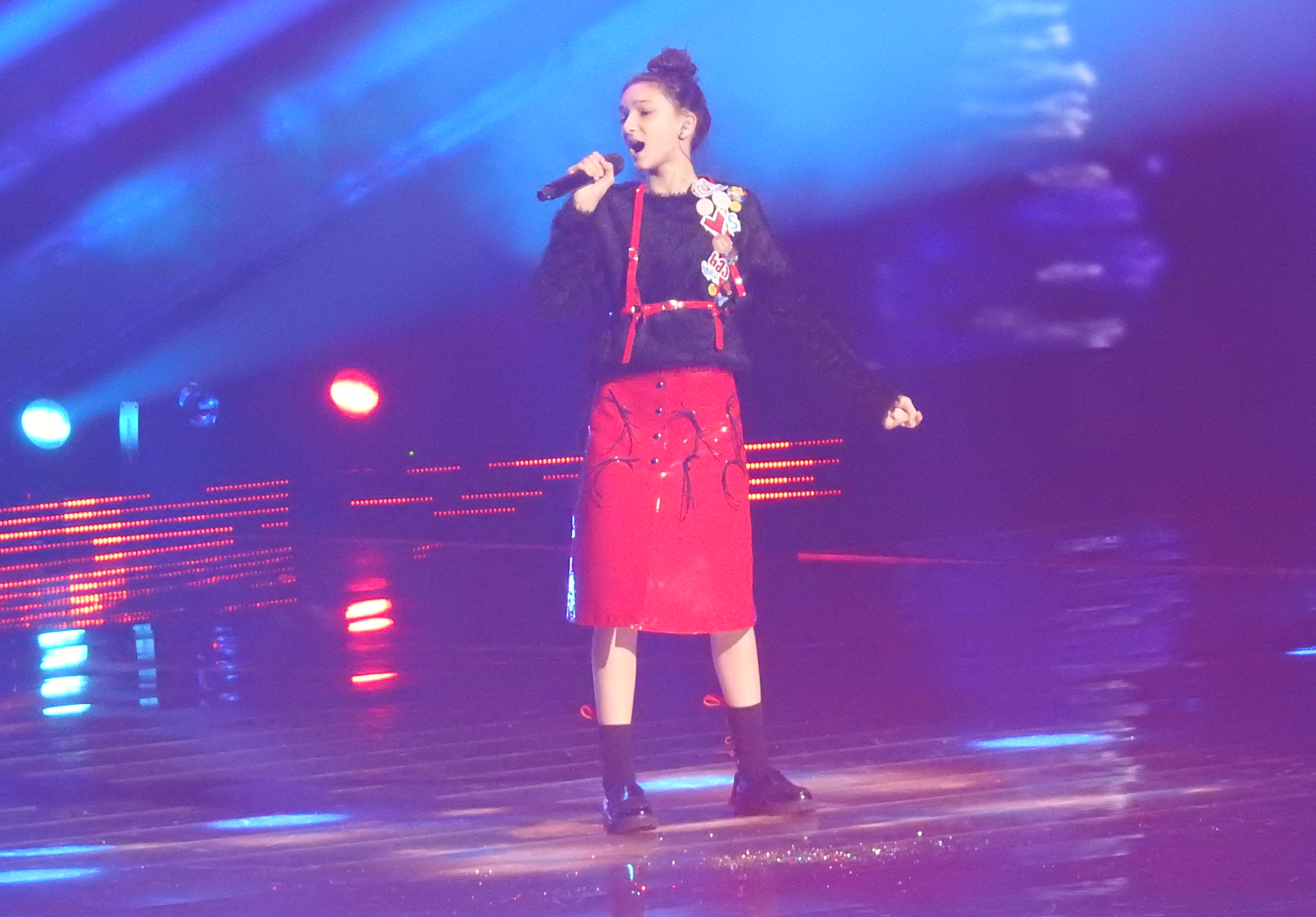

Background information
- Born: 11 May 2005 (age 21); Tbilisi, Georgia
- Occupation: Singer
- Instrument: Vocals

=== Tamar Edilashvili ===
Tamar Edilashvili (born 11 May 2005) is a Georgian child singer. She represented Georgia at the Junior Eurovision Song Contest 2018 in Minsk, Belarus.

The young singer currently studies at the NK School-Lyceum and the E. Mikeladze Central Music School. Tamar is no stranger to music competitions, having participated in the X Factor Georgia in 2017 and reaching the semi-final.

In October of last year, the three-month-long competition Ranina had begun, which saw Tamar and nine other entrants participate in multiple rounds of the show. During one of the shows, Tamar performed with Ethno-Jazz Band Iriao, the group that represented Georgia at this year's Eurovision Song Contest.

== At Junior Eurovision ==
During the opening ceremony and the running order draw which both took place on 19 November 2018, Georgia was drawn to perform thirteenth on 25 November 2018, following Australia and preceding Israel.

=== Voting ===
The same voting system that was introduced in the 2017 edition was used, where the results were determined by 50% online voting and 50% jury voting. Every participating broadcaster assembled a national jury that consisted of three music industry professionals and two children aged between 10 and 15 who were citizens of the country they represented. The rankings of those jurors were combined to make an overall top ten.

The online voting consisted of two phases. The first phase of the online voting began on 23 November 2018 when a recap of all the rehearsal performances was shown on the contest's website Junioreurovision.tv before the viewers could vote. After this, voters also had the option to watch longer one-minute clips from each participant's rehearsal. This first round of voting ended on 25 November at 15:59 CET. The second phase of the online voting took place during the live show and began right after the last performance and was open for 15 minutes. International viewers were able to vote for a minimum of three and a maximum of five songs. They were also able to vote for their own country's song. These votes were then turned into points which were determined by the percentage of votes received. For example, if a song received 10% of the votes, it received 10% of the available points.

Points awarded to Georgia
Score	Country
12 points	Ireland; Israel; Russia
10 points	France; Italy; Wales
8 points	Armenia
7 points	Ukraine
6 points	
5 points	Australia; Kazakhstan; Macedonia
4 points	
3 points	
2 points	Azerbaijan; Netherlands; Portugal; Serbia
1 points	Poland
Georgia received 39 points from the online vote

Points awarded by Georgia
Score	Country
12 points	Malta
10 points	Ukraine
8 points	Australia
7 points	Italy
6 points	Kazakhstan
5 points	Poland
4 points	France
3 points	Ireland
2 points	Netherlands
1 point	Belarus

==== Detailed voting results ====
Detailed voting results from Georgia
Draw	Country	Juror A	Juror B	Juror C	Juror D	Juror E	Rank	Points
01	Ukraine	1	1	2	3	3	2	10
02	Portugal	19	14	18	16	14	19	
03	Kazakhstan	14	7	15	4	4	5	6
04	Albania	13	19	16	15	16	17	
05	Russia	15	8	12	14	9	12	
06	Netherlands	16	11	10	6	7	9	2
07	Azerbaijan	12	16	17	17	18	18	
08	Belarus	18	9	9	7	11	10	1
09	Ireland	11	15	4	13	8	8	3
10	Serbia	10	18	14	9	12	13	
11	Italy	4	2	5	5	5	4	7
12	Australia	3	4	3	2	2	3	8
13	Georgia							
14	Israel	8	17	6	19	19	16	
15	France	6	5	7	12	10	7	4
16	Macedonia	5	10	19	11	13	11	
17	Armenia	9	12	8	18	17	14	
18	Wales	17	13	13	10	15	15	
19	Malta	2	3	1	1	1	1	12
20	Poland	7	6	11	8	6	6	5
