= Junior Eurovision Song Contest 2018 =

International song competition for youth

- #LightUp

Date and venue
- Final: 25 November 2018
- Venue: Minsk-Arena; Minsk, Belarus

Organisation
- Organiser: European Broadcasting Union (EBU)
- Executive supervisor: Jon Ola Sand

Production
- Host broadcaster: Belarusian Television and Radio Company (BTRC)
- Director: Marek Miil
- Executive producers: Gleb Shulman; Olga Shlyager; Olga Salamakha
- Presenters: Evgeny Perlin; Zinaida Kupriyanovich; Helena Meraai

Participants
- Number of entries: 20
- Debuting countries: Kazakhstan; Wales
- Returning countries: Azerbaijan; France; Israel
- Non-returning countries: Cyprus
- Participation map: Competing countries Countries that participated in the past but not in 2018

Vote
- Voting system: Each country's professional jury award 12, 10, 8–1 points to their top 10 songs. International viewers vote for 3–5 songs, and votes are converted to points by proportional representation.
- Winning song: Poland "Anyone I Want to Be"

The Junior Eurovision Song Contest 2018 was the sixteenth edition of the Junior Eurovision Song Contest, held on 25 November 2018 at the Minsk-Arena in Minsk, Belarus, and presented by Evgeny Perlin, Zinaida Kupriyanovich, and Helena Meraai. It was organised by the European Broadcasting Union (EBU) and host broadcaster the Belarusian Television and Radio Company (BTRC). It was the second time that the contest was held in Belarus, after hosting the 2010 edition at the same venue.

Broadcasters from a record of twenty countries took part in the contest, with Kazakhstan and Wales participating for the first time, France returning for the first time since 2004, alongside Azerbaijan for the first time since 2013, and Israel after missing the 2017 edition, while Cyprus withdrew from the contest. The previous year's winner Polina Bogusevich performed her entry again as the interval act, alongside the common song "#LightUp" sung by all the participants.

The winner was Poland with the song "Anyone I Want to Be" by Roksana Węgiel. This was Poland's first victory in the contest. Returning country France came second, while Australia placed third for the second year in a row. Kazakhstan was the fourth best performing debuting nation, after Croatia and Italy's victories in 2003 and 2014 respectively, and Armenia's second place in 2007, finishing sixth, whilst Wales came last.

== Location ==
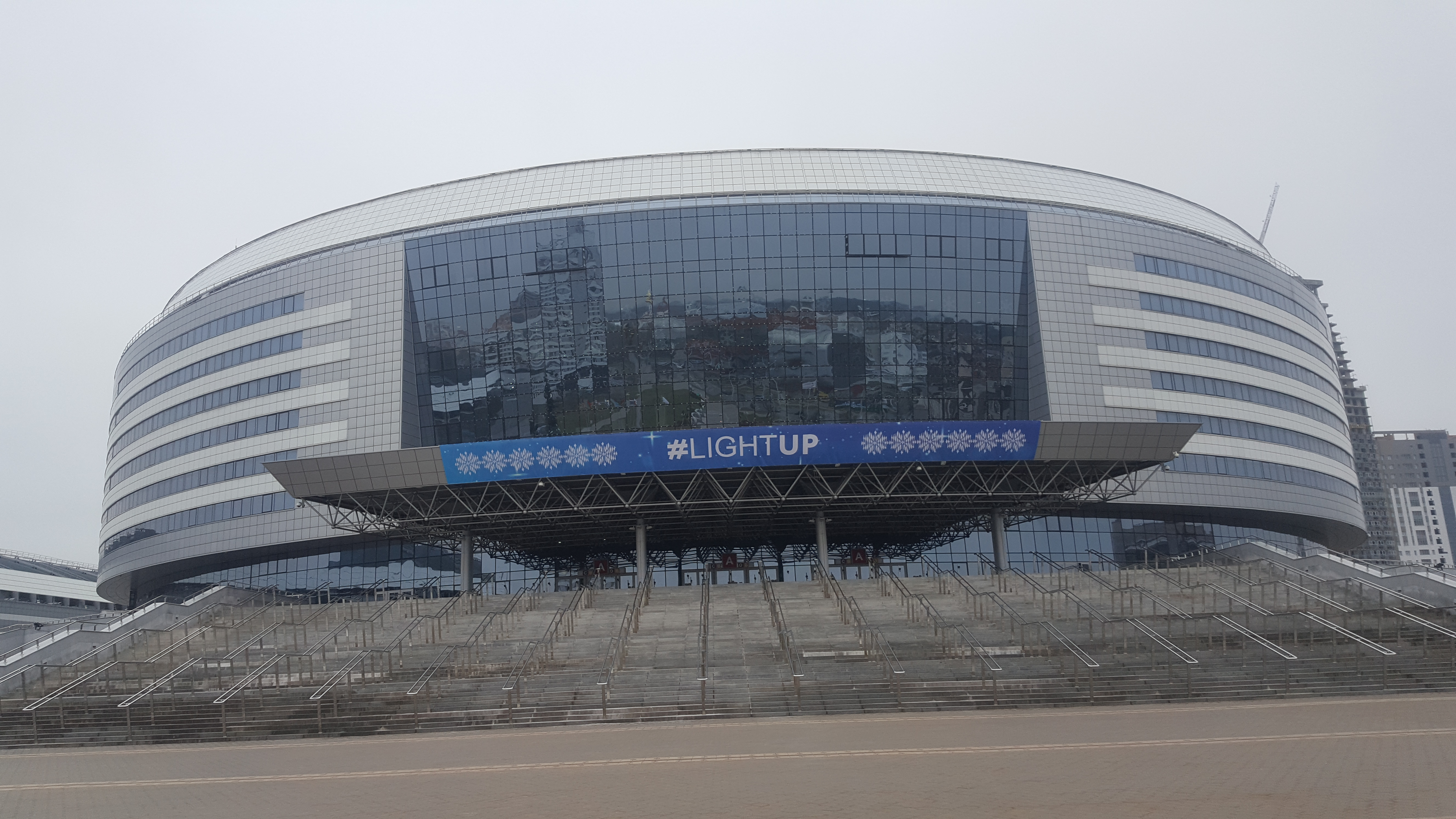
Minsk Arena in Minsk, where 2018 Junior Eurovision was hosted.

The EBU confirmed on 15 October 2017 that the contest would be hosted by Belarus. This was the second time Belarus hosted the Junior Eurovision Song contest, after hosting the 2010 contest.

=== Venue ===
On 21 November 2017, Belarus' Deputy Prime Minister Vasily Zharko confirmed that the contest was scheduled to be held at Minsk-Arena in November 2018. The arena previously hosted the 2010 contest. However, on 26 November 2017, it was confirmed by the host broadcaster that the exact location of the contest is still unknown, stating that Minsk Arena was one of the possible options. On 18 March 2018, the 15,000-capacity Minsk-Arena was confirmed as the venue by the contest organisers.

== Participants ==
On 25 July 2018, the EBU announced that 19 countries would participate in the 2018 contest. Kazakhstan and Wales made their debuts, while Azerbaijan, France and Israel returned to the contest, and Cyprus opted not to participate after doing so the previous two years. Despite originally confirming non-participation in the contest due to financial and structural difficulties, Ukraine was added to the list of participating countries on 2 August 2018, bringing the record of already 19-participating countries into a much larger record of 20 participating countries.

Participants of the Junior Eurovision Song Contest 2018
Country	Broadcaster	Artist	Song	Language	Songwriter(s)
Albania	RTSH	Efi Gjika	"Barbie"	Albanian, English	Efthimia Gjika; Hristina Gjika
Armenia	AMPTV	L.E.V.O.N	"L.E.V.O.N"	Armenian	Artem Valter
Australia	ABC	Jael	"Champion"	English	MSquared
Azerbaijan	İTV	Fidan Huseynova	"I Wanna Be Like You"	Azerbaijani, English	Fidan Huseynova; Ayten Ismikhanova; Isa Melikov; Elvira Michieva
Belarus	BTRC	Daniel Yastremski	"Time"	Russian, English	Kirill Good; Roman Kolodko
France	France Télévisions	Angélina	"Jamais sans toi"	French, English	Sarah Age Ali; Julien Comblat; Gary Fico; Nicolas Stawski
Georgia	GPB	Tamar Edilashvili	"Your Voice"	Georgian, English	Aleksandre Lordkipanidze; Sopho Toroshelidze
Ireland	TG4	Taylor Hynes	"IOU"	Irish	Jonas Gladnikoff; Taylor Hynes; Niall Mooney
Israel	IPBC	Noam Dadon	"Children Like These"	Hebrew	Eden Hason
Italy	RAI	Melissa and Marco	"What Is Love"	Italian, English	Marco Boni; Melissa Di Pasca; Franco Fasano; Mario Gardini; Marco Iardella; Fabrizio Palaferri
Kazakhstan	KA	Daneliya Tuleshova	"Òzińe sen" (Өзіңе сен)	Kazakh, English	Kamila Dairova; Artem Kuzmenkov; Ivan Lopukhov; Daneliya Tuleshova
Macedonia	MRT	Marija Spasovska	"Doma" (Дома)	Macedonian	Darko Dimitrov; Elena Risteska
Malta	PBS	Ela	"Marchin' On"	English	Emil Calleja Bayliss; Cyprian Cassar; Ela Mangion
Netherlands	AVROTROS	Max and Anne	"Samen"	Dutch, English	Babette Labeij; Robin van Veen; Dimitri Veltkamp
Poland	TVP	Roksana Węgiel	"Anyone I Want to Be"	Polish, English	Maegan Cottone; Cutfather; Daniel Davidsen; Nathan Duvall; Patryk Kumór; Małgorzata Uściłowska; Peter Wallevik
Portugal	RTP	Rita Laranjeira	"Gosto de tudo (já não gosto de nada)"	Portuguese	João Só
Russia	VGTRK	Anna Filipchuk	"Unbreakable"	Russian, English	Taras Demchuk
Serbia	RTS	Bojana Radovanović	"Svet" (Свет)	Serbian	Marija Marić Marković; Bojana Radovanović
Ukraine	UA:PBC	Darina Krasnovetska	"Say Love"	Ukrainian, English	Mykhailo Klymenko; Darina Krasnovetska; Volodymyr Sharykov
Wales	S4C	Manw	"Perta"	Welsh	Ifan Siôn Davies; Ywain Gwynedd; Richard James Hooson Roberts

== Format ==
=== Visual design ===
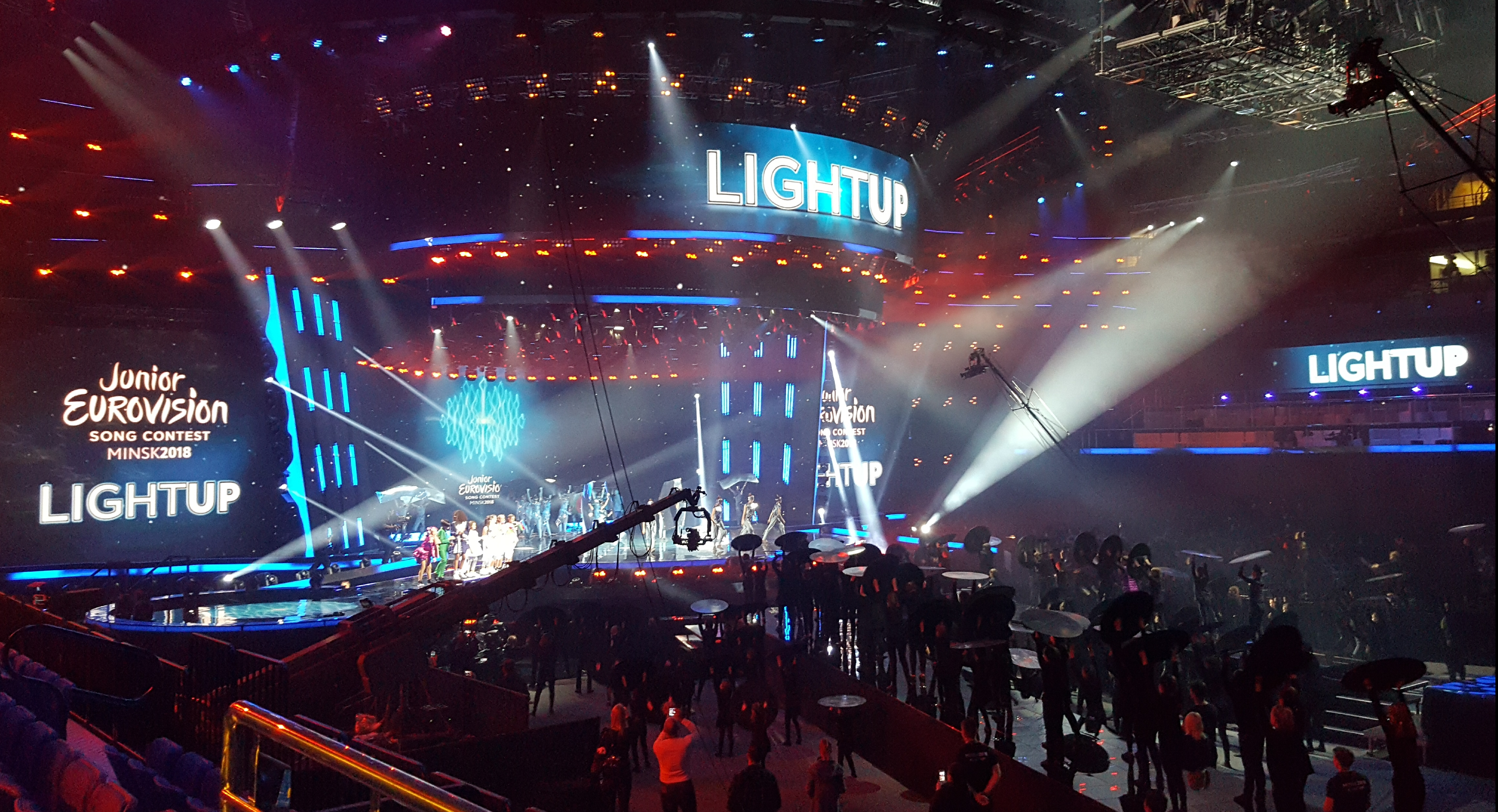
The stage during rehearsals for the opening act and flag parade.

The slogan was the hashtag #LightUp. The logo of the contest was based around a morning star made of vertically inverted soundwaves. The source of inspiration was the artistic potential and creative aspiration of the young participants who fill the scene like a star.

=== Hosts ===
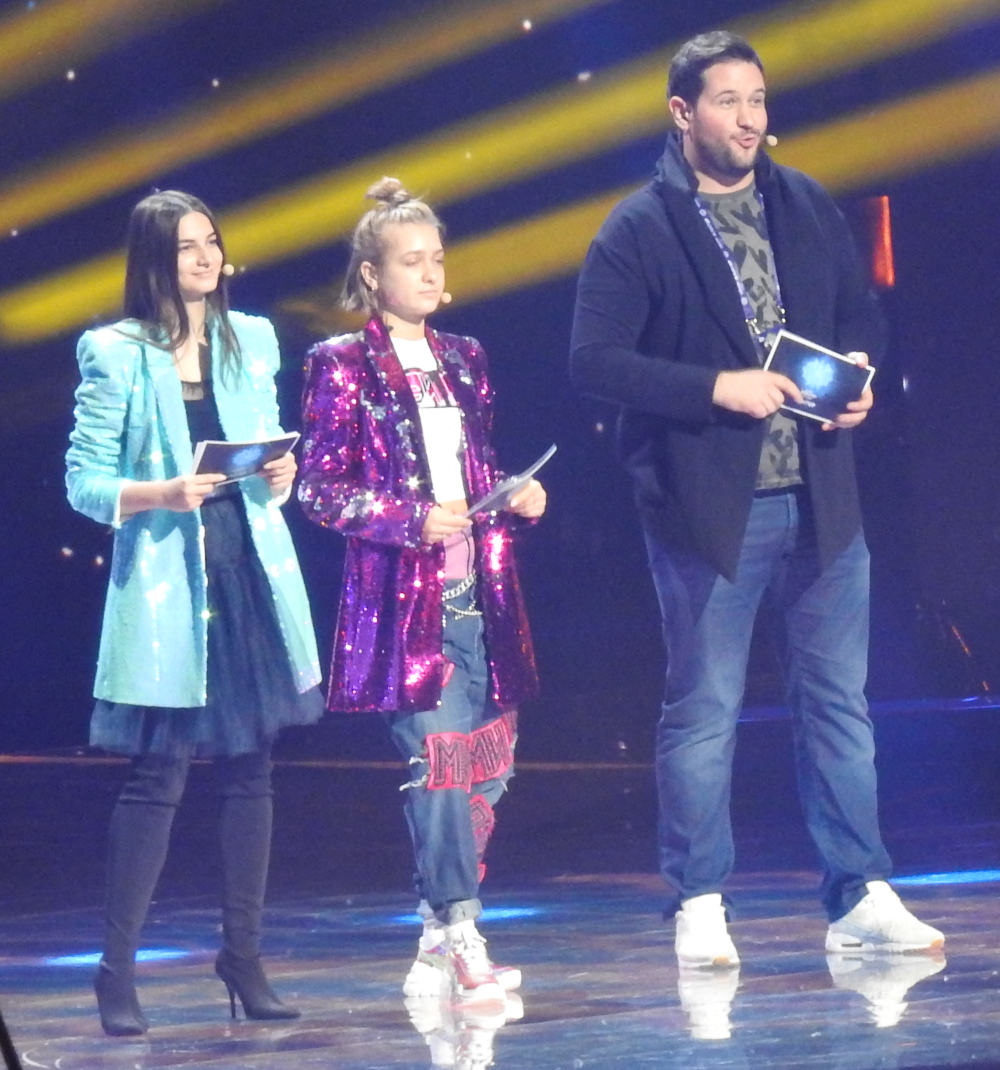
The hosts during a dress rehearsal

On 26 October 2018, it was announced that Eugene Perlin and Zinaida Kupriyanovich would be the main hosts of the contest, together with Helena Meraai in the green room. Meraai is the fourth person under the age of sixteen to ever host the Junior Eurovision Song Contest, after Ioana Ivan in 2006, Dmytro Borodin in 2009 and Lizi Japaridze in 2017, and is also the second former participant to host an edition of the contest. Meraai previously represented Belarus in the 2017 contest, where she placed fifth with the song "I Am the One". Perlin is a television personality who was Belarus' Eurovision commentator between 2013 and 2019, whilst Kupriyanovich is a singer and artist who has participated in Belarus' national selections for the 2015 and 2016 Junior Eurovision Song Contests and would later represent the country at the 2019 adult contest. It was also announced that Denis Dudinsky and Anna Kviloria would host the opening ceremony.

=== Voting ===
The results were determined by national juries and an online audience vote. Every country used a national jury that consisted of three music industry professionals and two kids aged between 10 and 15 who were citizens of the country they represent. The first phase of the online voting started on 23 November 2018 when a recap of all the rehearsal performances were shown on the official website before the viewers could vote. Following this recap, voters had the option to watch longer one-minute clips from each participant's rehearsal. This first round of voting ended on 25 November at 15:59 CET. The second phase of the online voting took place during the live show and started after the last performance and was open for 15 minutes. International viewers could vote for a minimum of three countries and a maximum of five, including their own country.

The number of points were determined by the percentage of votes received. The public vote counted for 50% of the final result, while the other 50% came from the professional juries.

=== Trophy ===
The trophy was designed by Kjell Engman of the Swedish glass company Kosta Boda, using the same design as was first introduced in the 2017 contest. The main trophy is a glass microphone with colored lines inside the upper part, which symbolize the flow of sound.

=== Postcards ===
Each postcard took place in a different location in Belarus. They all consisted of the upcoming participant putting on a virtual reality headset and, through it, experiencing a location in Belarus while doing various activities. At the conclusion of the postcard, the upcoming participant would take their headset off, and the performance would commence.

- Albania – Chelyuskintsev Park, Minsk
- Armenia – Čyžoŭka Arena, Minsk
- Australia – Lake Strusta
- Azerbaijan – Strochitsy
- Belarus – Minsk
- France – Independence Palace, Minsk
- Georgia – Minsk
- Ireland – Belovezhskaya Pushcha National Park
- Israel – Dinamo Stadium, Minsk
- Italy – Belarusian National Arts Museum, Minsk
- Kazakhstan – Minsk railway station and the Belarusian countryside
- Macedonia – Mir Castle
- Malta – Strochitsy
- Netherlands – National Library of Belarus, Minsk
- Poland – Minsk
- Portugal – Minsk
- Russia – National Opera and Ballet of Belarus, Minsk
- Serbia – A farm and stable, the Belarusian countryside
- Ukraine – Minsk
- Wales – Nesvizh Castle

== Contest overview ==
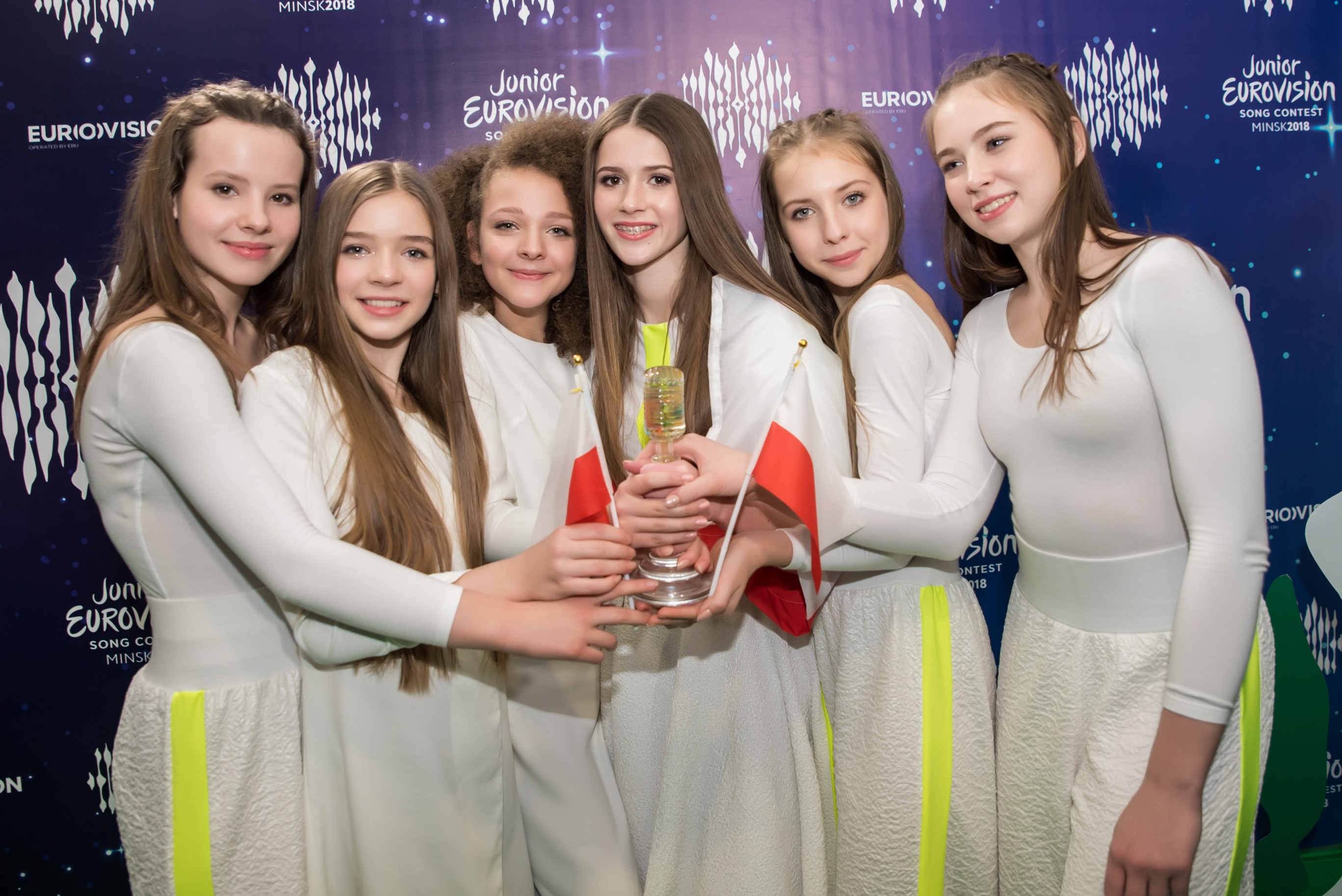
Roksana Węgiel and her backing dancers with the trophy

The event took place on 25 November 2018 at 17:00 MSK (16:00 CET). Twenty countries participated, with the running order published on 19 November 2018. All the countries competing were eligible to vote with the jury vote, as well as participating and non-participating countries under an aggregated international online vote, eligible to vote. Poland won with 215 points, also winning the online vote. France came second with 203 points, with Australia (who won the jury vote), Ukraine, and Malta completing the top five. Azerbaijan, Albania, Portugal, Serbia, Wales occupied the bottom five positions.

The opening of the show featured the traditional flag parade. During the interval, Russian singer Polina Bogusevich performed a new version of her winning song "Wings". All participants then joined on stage for a rendition of the common song, "#LightUp".

R/O	Country	Artist	Song	Points	Place
1	Ukraine	Darina Krasnovetska	"Say Love"	182	4
2	Portugal	Rita Laranjeira	"Gosto de tudo (já não gosto de nada)"	42	18
3	Kazakhstan	Daneliya Tuleshova	"Òzińe sen"	171	6
4	Albania	Efi Gjika	"Barbie"	44	17
5	Russia	Anna Filipchuk	"Unbreakable"	122	10
6	Netherlands	Max and Anne	"Samen"	91	13
7	Azerbaijan	Fidan Huseynova	"I Wanna Be Like You"	47	16
8	Belarus	Daniel Yastremski	"Time"	114	11
9	Ireland	Taylor Hynes	"IOU"	48	15
10	Serbia	Bojana Radovanović	"Svet"	30	19
11	Italy	Melissa and Marco	"What Is Love"	151	7
12	Australia	Jael	"Champion"	201	3
13	Georgia	Tamar Edilashvili	"Your Voice"	144	8
14	Israel	Noam Dadon	"Children Like These"	81	14
15	France	Angélina	"Jamais sans toi"	203	2
16	Macedonia	Marija Spasovska	"Doma"	99	12
17	Armenia	L.E.V.O.N	"L.E.V.O.N"	125	9
18	Wales	Manw	"Perta"	29	20
19	Malta	Ela	"Marchin' On"	181	5
20	Poland	Roksana Węgiel	"Anyone I Want to Be"	215	1

=== Spokespersons ===
1. Ukraine – Anastasiya Baginska
2. Portugal – Nadezhda Sidorova
3. Kazakhstan – Aruzhan Khafiz
4. Albania – Daniil Lazuko
5. Russia – Dina Baru and Khryusha
6. Netherlands – Vincent Miranovich
7. Azerbaijan – Valeh Huseynbeyli
8. Belarus – Arina Rovba
9. Ireland – Alex Hynes
10. Serbia – Lana Karić
11. Italy – Yan Musvidas
12. Australia – Ksenia Galetskaya
13. Georgia – Nikoloz Vasadze
14. Israel – Adi
15. France – Daniil Rotenko and Lubava Marchuk
16. Macedonia – Arina Pekhtereva
17. Armenia – Vardan Margaryan
18. Wales – Gwen Rowley
19. Malta – Milana Borodko
20. Poland – Grace

== Detailed voting results ==
Split results
Place	Combined		Jury		Online Vote	
Place	Country	Points	Country	Points	Country	Points
1	Poland	215	Australia	148	Poland	136
2	France	203	Malta	138	France	117
3	Australia	201	Georgia	105	Kazakhstan	103
4	Ukraine	182	Ukraine	104	Ukraine	78
5	Malta	181	Italy	94	Armenia	70
6	Kazakhstan	171	France	86	Netherlands	68
7	Italy	151	Poland	79	Russia	62
8	Georgia	144	Kazakhstan	68	Italy	57
9	Armenia	125	Macedonia	64	Australia	53
10	Russia	122	Belarus	61	Belarus	53
11	Belarus	114	Russia	60	Israel	47
12	Macedonia	99	Armenia	55	Malta	43
13	Netherlands	91	Israel	34	Portugal	42
14	Israel	81	Netherlands	23	Georgia	39
15	Ireland	48	Azerbaijan	17	Ireland	36
16	Azerbaijan	47	Ireland	12	Macedonia	35
17	Albania	44	Albania	10	Albania	34
18	Portugal	42	Serbia	2	Azerbaijan	30
19	Serbia	30	Portugal	0	Wales	29
20	Wales	29	Wales	0	Serbia	28

Detailed voting results
Voting procedure used: 100% jury vote 100% online vote		Total score	Jury vote score	Online vote score	Jury vote																			
Voting procedure used: 100% jury vote 100% online vote		Total score	Jury vote score	Online vote score	Ukraine	Portugal	Kazakhstan	Albania	Russia	Netherlands	Azerbaijan	Belarus	Ireland	Serbia	Italy	Australia	Georgia	Israel	France	Macedonia	Armenia	Wales	Malta	Poland
Contestants	Ukraine	182	104	78		7	6	2	3	4	3	3	5	8	7		10	8	5	10	2	5	4	12
Contestants	Portugal	42	0	42																				
Contestants	Kazakhstan	171	68	103	5			4	7	5	8	6	4	5			6			8	4		6	
Contestants	Albania	44	10	34							1		1							1		2	5	
Contestants	Russia	122	60	62		1	4			3	12	2				8		5			10	7	2	6
Contestants	Netherlands	91	23	68	1				2					1		3	2	3	4		6	1		
Contestants	Azerbaijan	47	17	30				6					3		4							3	1	
Contestants	Belarus	114	61	53		10	2			8	10		2		5	1	1				12		10	
Contestants	Ireland	48	12	36													3		1					8
Contestants	Serbia	30	2	28																2				
Contestants	Italy	151	94	57	6	4	10				4	7	10	6		7	7	7	3	12			8	3
Contestants	Australia	201	148	53	12	12	3	7	10	12	6	12	7	3	12		8	2	6	7	7	12		10
Contestants	Georgia	144	105	39	7	2	5		12	2	2		12	2	10	5		12	10	5	8	10		1
Contestants	Israel	81	34	47	4	3	7	1	5	1					6				2				3	2
Contestants	France	203	86	117		5		12	6	7	7	8	6	7		4	4	1		6	1		12	
Contestants	Macedonia	99	64	35	2		12	10	1			1		12	1	2			7		5	4		7
Contestants	Armenia	125	55	70	3	6		3		6		5			3	6		4	8				7	4
Contestants	Wales	29	0	29																				
Contestants	Malta	181	138	43	10	8	8	5	8	10	5	10	8	4	8	12	12	10		4	3	8		5
Contestants	Poland	215	79	136	8		1	8	4			4		10	2	10	5	6	12	3		6		

=== 12 points ===
Below is a summary of all 12 points received from each country's professional juries.

N.	Contestant	Nation(s) giving 12 points
6	Australia	Belarus, Italy, Netherlands, Portugal, Ukraine, Wales
3	Georgia	Ireland, Israel, Russia
2	France	Albania, Malta
2	Macedonia	Kazakhstan, Serbia
2	Malta	Australia, Georgia
1	Belarus	Armenia
1	Italy	Macedonia
1	Poland	France
1	Russia	Azerbaijan
1	Ukraine	Poland

=== Online voting ===
A total of 1,283,921 valid votes were received during the voting windows.

Online voting results
Contestant	Votes	Points
Poland	~150,529	136
France	~129,499	117
Kazakhstan	~114,003	103
Ukraine	~86,333	78
Armenia	~77,478	70
Netherlands	~75,264	68
Russia	~68,623	62
Italy	~63,089	57
Australia	~58,662	53
Belarus	~58,662	53
Israel	~52,021	47
Malta	~47,594	43
Portugal	~46,487	42
Georgia	~43,166	39
Ireland	~39,846	36
Macedonia	~38,739	35
Albania	~37,632	34
Azerbaijan	~33,205	30
Wales	~32,098	29
Serbia	~30,991	28
Total	1,283,921	

== Other countries ==
For a country to be eligible for potential participation in the Junior Eurovision Song Contest, it needs to be an active member of the EBU. It is currently unknown whether the EBU issue invitations of participation to all 56 active members like they do for the Eurovision Song Contest.

=== Active EBU members ===
- Bosnia and Herzegovina – On 25 May 2018, the Bosnian broadcaster Radio and Television of Bosnia and Herzegovina (BHRT) stated that they would not be allowed to debut at the contest in the near future until the debt-related sanctions placed on them by the EBU were lifted.
- Denmark – On 16 February 2018, it was reported that the EBU was calling on Danish broadcaster Danish Broadcasting Corporation (DR) to return to the contest after an 11-year break. However, Jan Lagermand Lundme, the head of Entertainment at the Danish broadcaster, played down the likelihood of Denmark returning to the competition, saying "Now, never say never, but as long as the show is, as it is now, I’m definitely not going to compete again. The values that we put in Denmark in a program for children do not match the values of the Junior Eurovision Song Contest… It seems that the children are on stage and play adults instead of acting as children, and we think that is fundamentally wrong. Children must be children, they should not try to strive to be something they are not. It’s super bad for us, because we really wanted to be part of the show. Participating in a concept like Junior Eurovision would be a natural step for us after MGP, but it does not work when we do not feel the show fits the Danish values."
- Lithuania – On 28 February 2018, the Lithuanian broadcaster Lithuanian National Radio and Television (LRT) declared that they would not return to contest in the near future. LRT executive producer Audrius Giržadas stated that "this contest has become a clone of the main Eurovision Song Contest and has nothing to do with childhood, little girls go on stage with clipped hairs, glued eyelashes and bare belly, copying Beyoncé and Christina Aguilera – this is not an event that we would like to participate in." Lithuania last took part in 2011.
- United Kingdom – On 2 January 2018, the Belarusian broadcaster National State Television and Radio Company of the Republic of Belarus (BTRC) announced that a representative from an unknown British broadcaster would be attending the supervisory meeting for the 2018 contest. Two days later it was confirmed that the United Kingdom would not take part in the Steering Group meetings. During the year the contest was held, the United Kingdom last took part in 2005 before it would return in 2022. However, Wales, a country that is part of the United Kingdom, competed.

== Broadcasts ==
Broadcasters and commentators in participating countries
Country	Broadcaster	Channel(s)	Commentator(s)	Ref.
Albania	RTSH	RTSH 1, RTSH Muzikë, Radio Tirana 1	Andri Xhahu	
Armenia	AMPTV	Armenia 1	Mika, Dalita	
Australia	ABC	ABC Me	Grace Koh, Pip Rasmussen, and Lawrence Gunatilaka	
Azerbaijan	İTV		Shafiga Efendiyeva	
Belarus	BTRC	Belarus 1, Belarus 24	Georgiy Koldun and Andrey Makaenok	
France	France Télévisions	France 2	Madame Monsieur and Stéphane Bern	
Georgia	GPB	First Channel	Helen Kalandadze and George Abashidze	
Ireland	TG4	TG4	Mícheál Ó Ciarradh and Sinéad Ní Uallacháin	
Israel	IPBC	Kan Educational	Dudu Erez and Alma Zohar	
Italy	RAI	Rai Gulp	Federica Carta and Mario Acampa	
Kazakhstan	Khabar Agency	Khabar 24	Unknown	
Macedonia	MRT	MRT 1	Eli Tanaskovska	
Malta	PBS	TVM	No commentary	
Netherlands	NPO	NPO Zapp	Jan Smit	
Poland	TVP	TVP ABC, TVP Polonia, TVP HD	Artur Orzech	
Portugal	RTP	RTP1, RTP Internacional, RTP África	Nuno Galopim	
Russia	C1R, VGTRK	Carousel	Anton Zorkin	
Serbia	RTS	RTS2, RTS Satelit	Tamara Petković	
Ukraine	UA:PBC	UA:First, UA:Crimea and UA:Kultura	Timur Miroshnychenko	
Wales	S4C		Welsh: Trystan Ellis-Morris, English: Stifyn Parri	

Broadcasters and commentators in non-participating countries
Country	Broadcaster(s)	Commentator(s)	Ref.
New Zealand	World FM 88.2	Ewan Spence, Sharleen Wright and Ben Robertson	
United Kingdom	Radio Six International and Fun Kids	Ewan Spence, Sharleen Wright and Ben Robertson	

== Official album ==
Cover art of the official album

Junior Eurovision Song Contest Minsk 2018 is a compilation album put together by the European Broadcasting Union, and was released by Universal Music Group on 16 November 2018. The album features all the songs from the 2018 contest.

== See also ==
- Eurovision Song Contest 2018
- Eurovision Young Musicians 2018
