= Wales in the Junior Eurovision Song Contest =

- Junior Eurovision Song Contest
- Participating broadcaster: Sianel Pedwar Cymru (S4C)

Participation summary
- Appearances: 2
- First appearance: 2018
- Last appearance: 2019
- Highest placement: 18th: 2019
- Participation history: 2018; 2019; 2020 – 2026

Wales has been represented at the Junior Eurovision Song Contest in 2018 and 2019. The Welsh participating broadcaster in the contest was Sianel Pedwar Cymru (S4C).

In 2018 and 2019, S4C selected its artist through the televised national final Chwilio am Seren (English: Search for a Star), with the song selected internally. In both years, the competition was held at Venue Cymru in Llandudno.

Although Wales has English as a co-official language, their entries were sung primarily in Welsh due to being represented by a Welsh-language broadcaster.

== History ==
Between 2003 and 2005, ITV had participated in the Junior Eurovision Song Contest representing the United Kingdom as a whole, which includes Wales. Sianel Pedwar Cymru (S4C), as a full member of the European Broadcasting Union (EBU), is allowed to participate in Eurovision events representing Wales when a member broadcaster with national coverage does not participate representing the entire UK. S4C had showed interest in participating in the 2008 contest, but in the end decided against participating.

S4C announced that it would debut in the 2018 contest on 9 May 2018. It was represented by the song "Perta" performed by Manw, placing last in a field of 20 songs with 29 points. Wales was represented in the 2019 contest by the song "Calon yn Curo" performed by Erin Mai and finished 18th with 35 points.

2019 was the last year Wales participated in the contest. S4C cited the COVID-19 pandemic as the reason for not participating in subsequent editions.

On 25 August 2022, the British Broadcasting Corporation (BBC) announced its participation in the 2022 contest after a sixteen-year absence of the United Kingdom.

On 16 November 2024, S4C confirmed that it did not participate in the 2024 contest due to the BBC's late withdrawal, leaving it with insufficient time to organise an entry and form a delegation. However, a spokesperson for S4C stated that there is a prospect for Welsh participation in 2025, with 2018 representative Manw calling for a return to the contest. Wales continued its absence in 2025, and in 2026.

== Participation overview ==
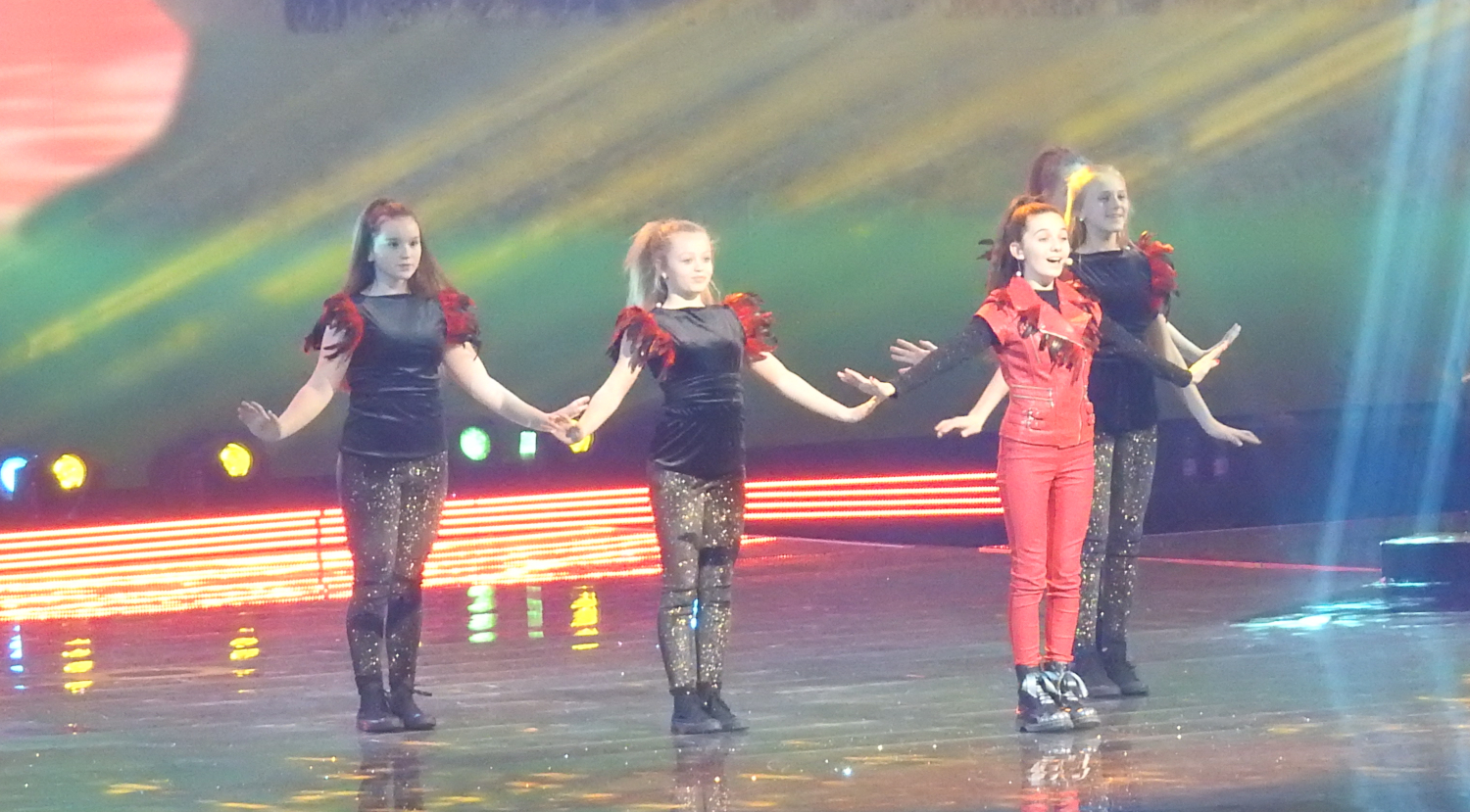
Manw in Minsk (2018)

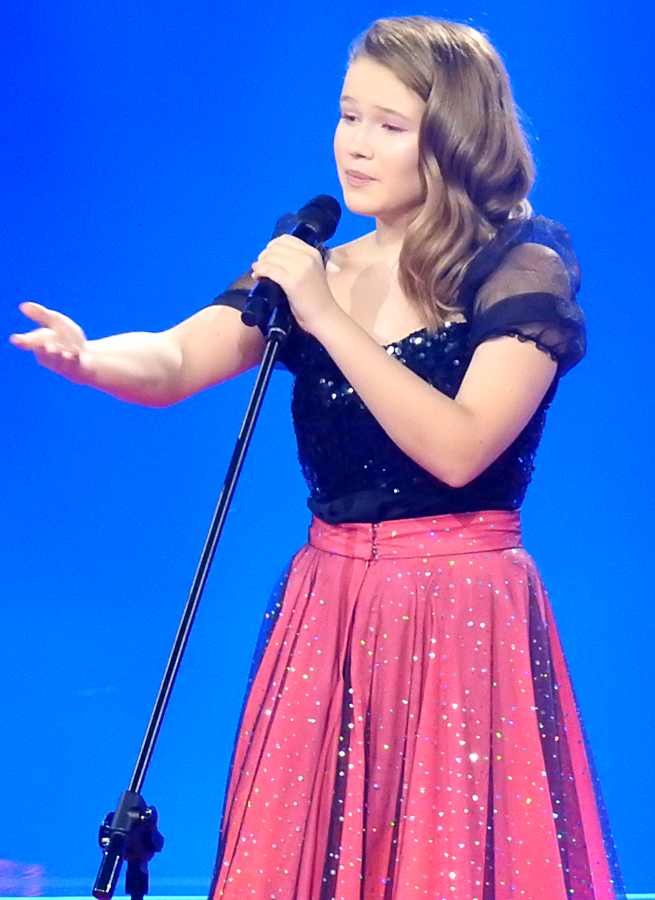
Erin Mai in Gliwice (2019)

Table key
◁	Last place

Year	Artist	Song	Language	Place	Points
2018	Manw	"Perta"	Welsh	20 ◁	29
2019	Erin Mai	"Calon yn curo (Heart Beating)"	Welsh	18	35

== Commentators and spokespersons ==
S4C sent their own commentators to each contest in order to provide commentary in the Welsh language. Spokespersons were also chosen by the national broadcaster in order to announce the awarding points from Wales. The table below list the details of each commentator and spokesperson since 2018.

Year	Commentator	Spokesperson	Ref.
2018	Trystan Ellis-Morris (Welsh) and Stifyn Parri (English)	Gwen Rowley	
2019	Trystan Ellis-Morris (Welsh) and Stifyn Parri (English)	Cadi Morgan	
2020–2026	No broadcast	Did not participate	

== See also ==
- United Kingdom in the Eurovision Song Contest
- United Kingdom in the Junior Eurovision Song Contest
