= The Eye (radio station) =

103 The Eye
- Melton Mowbray; England
- Broadcast area: Vale of Belvoir
- Frequency: 103.0 FM also on DAB+
- RDS: THE EYE

Programming
- Format: Community radio

Ownership
- Owner: The Eye FM Ltd

History
- First air date: 1 November 2005

Links
- Website: www.103theeye.co.uk

103 The Eye is a community radio station serving Melton Mowbray and the Vale of Belvoir in the East Midlands of England. It broadcasts on 103FM, on DAB+, online and via smart speakers, and takes its name from the River Eye which flows through Melton Mowbray.

== Background ==
"103 The Eye" was the first community radio station in the United Kingdom to begin broadcasting on a full five-year licence granted by Ofcom. Fifteen other stations had previously held short-term licences under the pilot scheme (originally titled "Access Radio"), but The Eye was the first station to go on air after the format was opened to general applications.

Before 2004 the station had been known as "TWC", and had held a number of 28-day restricted service licence broadcasts with the aim of persuading the Radio Authority to license a new local commercial radio station to serve Melton Mowbray, Cotgrave, Bingham and the surrounding areas of southeast Nottinghamshire and north Leicestershire.

The station broadcasts a variety of popular music from the 1950s to the present day, plus specialist discussion and music shows. The first song broadcast after the official launch at 07:00 on 1 November 2005 was "Eye of the Tiger" by Survivor. The first presenters' voices heard were those of Cliff King and Dave Baron.

News bulletins are provided by Sky News Radio. There are also local news features and local events diary broadcasts during the day.

In 2006, the station moved from its original studios at Hickling Pastures to Melton Mowbray. It has since established additional studios in local schools and is one of the most prolific community radio stations broadcasting more than 100 hours of locally produced programming every week; the majority of this is broadcast live. It gained the King's Award for Voluntary Service in 2023, the group equivalent to an MBE, and has won numerous other awards for its work over the years, given by the Melton Times newspaper, Melton Borough Council, Alicia Kearns MP for Rutland and Melton, and the Federation of Small Businesses as can be seen on its website www.103theeye.co.uk

== Rock the Vale ==
"Rock the Vale" was a concert organised in association with the station over the May Day bank holiday weekend. It was headlined by Showaddywaddy and featured a number of tribute acts, and the final of the stations Rock Idol. Proceeds from the event went to fund the station and Cancer Research UK.

== See also ==
- List of radio stations in the United Kingdom.
