= Netherlands in the Junior Eurovision Song Contest 2018 =

2018 Junior Eurovision participation

- Junior Eurovision Song Contest 2018
- Country: Netherlands
- Selection process: Junior Songfestival 2018
- Selection date: 29 September 2018

Competing entry
- Song: "Samen"
- Artist: Max & Anne
- Songwriters: Babette Labeij; Dimitri Veltkamp; Robin van Veen

Placement
- Final result: 13th, 91 points

Participation chronology

The Netherlands was represented at the Junior Eurovision Song Contest 2018 which took place in Minsk, Belarus on 25 November 2018. The Dutch broadcaster AVROTROS was responsible for the organisation of their representative at the contest. Their entry was selected through the national selection Junior Songfestival 2018, which had four songs. For the first time in the history of Junior Songfestival, the competing songs were written fully by established songwriting teams and assigned to the participants that were grouped into four acts.

== Background ==
Prior to the 2018 Contest, the Netherlands had participated in the Junior Eurovision Song Contest fifteen times since its first entry in 2003. The Netherlands have won the contest on one occasion: in 2009 with the song "Click Clack" performed by Ralf Mackenbach. In 2017, the Netherlands placed 4th out of 16 entries with the song "Love Me" performed by the boy band Fource.

== Before Junior Eurovision ==
=== Junior Songfestival 2018 ===
==== Competing entries ====
The number of episodes would be limited to just the final for the first time since 2006, and broadcast live with the winner being decided by both jury and televoting for the first time since 2015. Another big change is that AVROTROS grouped the finalists into four acts and assigned specially-made songs written by well-known songwriting teams.

The artists were credited without their surnames.

Artist	Song	Songwriter(s)	Ref.
Remix	"What Girls Do"	Lennard Vink, Joost Griffioen, Anja Zegwaard	
Anna Grigorian	"Touch Each Other's Heart"	Jermain van der Bogt, Willem Laseroms	
Max & Anne	"Samen"	Babette Labeij, Dimitri Veltkamp, Robin van Veen	
Kiya van Rossum	"Butterflies"	Christina Monteiro, Douriz Monteiro, Garfaёila Jovanca Ethelina Brown, Milangchelo Junior Martina	

==== Final ====
The final was held on 29 September 2018, hosted by Romy Monteiro.

Final – 29 September 2018
Draw	Artist	Song	Kids Jury	Jury (Note: The members of the professional jury were Maan, Buddy Vedder and Tommie Christiaan.)	Televote	Total	Place
1	Remix	"What Girls Do"	8	9	9	26	3
2	Max & Anne	"Samen"	12	10	12	34	1
3	Kiya	"Butterflies"	9	8	8	25	4
4	Anna	"Touch Each Other's Heart"	10	12	10	32	2

== Artist and song information ==
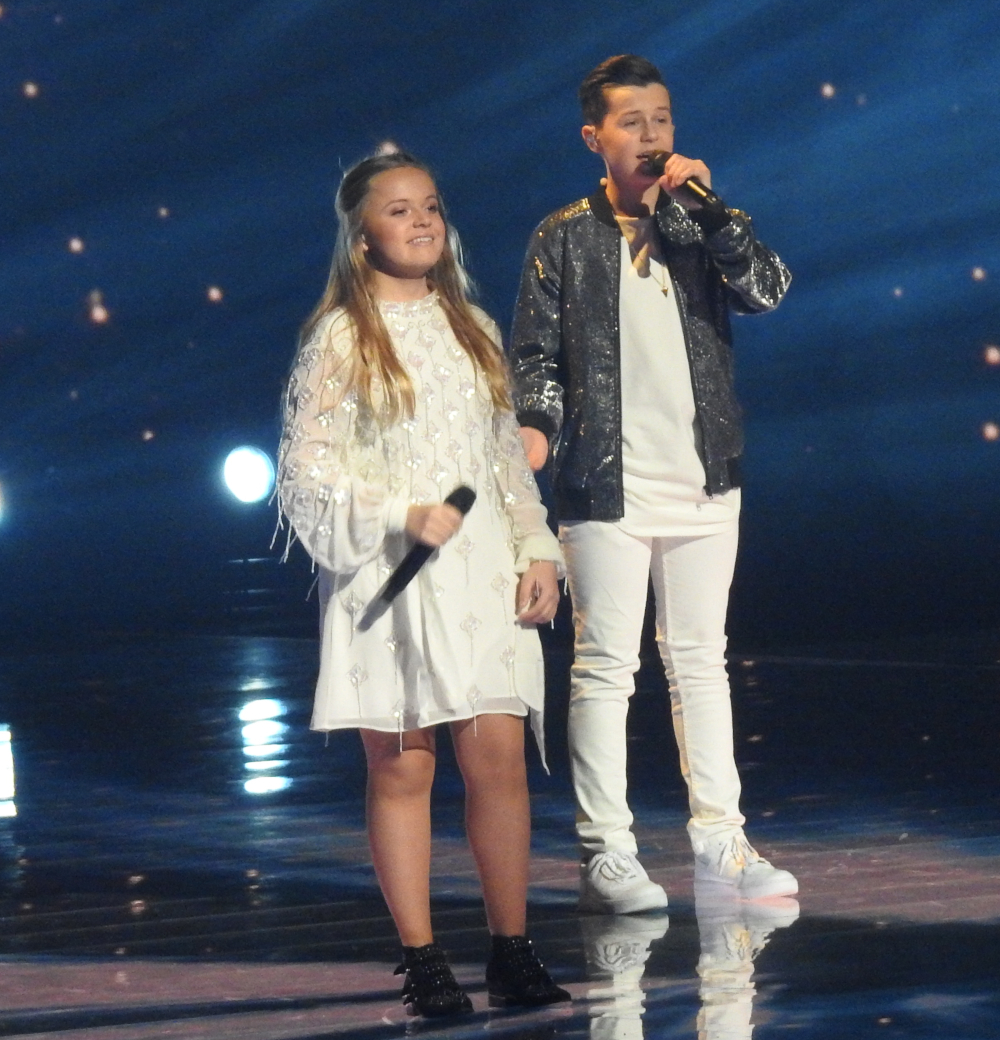
Anne Buhre (left) and Maxime Albertazzi (right) at the Junior Eurovision Song Contest 2018

(Netherlands) "Samen"

Junior Eurovision Song Contest 2018 entry
- Country: Netherlands
- Artists: Maxime Albertazzi and Anne Buhre
- As: Max & Anne
- Languages: Dutch, English

Finals performance
- Final result: 13th
- Final points: 91

Entry chronology
- ◄ "Love Me" (2017)
- "Dans met jou" (2019) ►

=== Max & Anne ===
Max & Anne were a pop duo consisting of child singers Maxime Albertazzi and Anne Buhre. The duo was active between 2018 and 2019. They represented the Netherlands in the Junior Eurovision Song Contest 2018 with the song "Samen".

Albertazzi was born on 17 August 2004 in Houten. In July 2020, she came out as transgender. Buhre was born on 31 March 2004 in Voorschoten.

=== Samen ===
"Samen" (transl. 'Together') is a song by Dutch singers Maxime Albertazzi and Anne Buhre. It represented the Netherlands in the Junior Eurovision Song Contest 2018. Maxime and Anne performed on the big stage and their dancers Idaila Voorn and Marc Vermeulen performed on the extra stage. They finished thirteenth with 91 points (23 points from national juries and 68 points from the online voting).

== At Junior Eurovision ==
During the opening ceremony and the running order draw which both took place on 19 November 2018, Netherlands was drawn to perform sixth on 25 November 2018, following Russia and preceding Azerbaijan.

=== Voting ===
The same voting system that was introduced in the 2017 edition was used, where the results were determined by 50% online voting and 50% jury voting. Every participating broadcaster assembled a national jury that consisted of three music industry professionals and two children aged between 10 and 15 who were citizens of the country they represented. The rankings of those jurors were combined to make an overall top ten.

The online voting consisted of two phases. The first phase of the online voting began on 23 November 2018 when a recap of all the rehearsal performances was shown on the contest's website Junioreurovision.tv before the viewers could vote. After this, voters also had the option to watch longer one-minute clips from each participant's rehearsal. This first round of voting ended on 25 November at 15:59 CET. The second phase of the online voting took place during the live show and began right after the last performance and was open for 15 minutes. International viewers were able to vote for a minimum of three and a maximum of five songs. They were also able to vote for their own country's song. These votes were then turned into points which were determined by the percentage of votes received. For example, if a song received 10% of the votes, it received 10% of the available points.

Points awarded to the Netherlands
Score	Country
12 points	
10 points	
8 points	
7 points	
6 points	Armenia
5 points	
4 points	France
3 points	Australia; Israel
2 points	Georgia; Russia
1 point	Serbia; Ukraine; Wales
The Netherlands received 68 points from the online vote

Points awarded by the Netherlands
Score	Country
12 points	Australia
10 points	Malta
8 points	Belarus
7 points	France
6 points	Armenia
5 points	Kazakhstan
4 points	Ukraine
3 points	Russia
2 points	Georgia
1 point	Israel

==== Detailed voting results ====
Detailed voting results from the Netherlands
Draw	Country	Juror A	Juror B	Juror C	Juror D	Juror E	Rank	Points
01	Ukraine	10	6	11	5	2	7	4
02	Portugal	19	17	18	19	12	19	
03	Kazakhstan	8	4	7	10	3	6	5
04	Albania	9	14	15	9	15	13	
05	Russia	7	8	3	13	9	8	3
06	Netherlands							
07	Azerbaijan	18	16	12	14	14	17	
08	Belarus	1	1	9	6	8	3	8
09	Ireland	6	18	13	12	17	14	
10	Serbia	17	11	19	16	13	18	
11	Italy	14	19	16	7	11	15	
12	Australia	4	3	2	2	1	1	12
13	Georgia	16	15	6	3	10	9	2
14	Israel	3	7	8	17	16	10	1
15	France	5	2	4	11	6	4	7
16	Macedonia	11	10	14	18	5	11	
17	Armenia	2	5	5	15	7	5	6
18	Wales	15	13	17	4	19	16	
19	Malta	12	9	1	1	4	2	10
20	Poland	13	12	10	8	18	12	
