= Kazakhstan in the Junior Eurovision Song Contest 2018 =

- Junior Eurovision Song Contest 2018
- Participating broadcaster: Khabar Agency (KA)
- Country: Kazakhstan
- Selection process: National Final
- Selection date: 22 September 2018

Competing entry
- Song: "Òzińe sen"
- Artist: Daneliya Tuleshova
- Songwriters: Ivan Lopukhov; Artem Kuzmenkov; Kamila Dairova; Daneliya Tuleshova

Placement
- Final result: 6th, 171 points

Participation chronology

Kazakhstan was represented at the Junior Eurovision Song Contest 2018 with the song "Òzińe sen", written by Ivan Lopukhov, Artem Kuzmenkov, Kamila Dairova, and Daneliya Tuleshova, and performed by Tuleshova herself. The Kazakh participating broadcaster, Khabar Agency (KA), organised a televised national final to select its entry for the contest. The entry went on to place 6th at the Junior Eurovision Song Contest with 171 points. This marked the first time Kazakhstan participated in any Eurovision event.

== Background ==
On 25 November 2017, Channel 31 of Kazakhstan revealed their intention to participate in the Junior Eurovision Song Contest 2018. Initial claims emerged on 22 December 2017 from both the Kazakh Minister of Culture and Sports, Arystanbek Mukhamediuly; and the Director General of Channel 31, Bagdat Kodzhahmetov; that the broadcaster had applied to become a member of the European Broadcasting Union (EBU), with the hope of participating both in the Eurovision Song Contest and the Junior Eurovision Song Contest. Kodzhahmetov invited Daneliya Tuleshova, winner of the fourth season of Ukraine's version of The Voice Kids, to take part in the casting process to represent Kazakhstan in the Junior Eurovision Song Contest. However, the EBU made a statement the following day rejecting the possibility of any broadcaster from Kazakhstan to become an active member of the EBU, since the country is neither within the European Broadcasting Area (EBA) nor is a member of the Council of Europe.

Prior to the 2018 contest, Channel 31 had sent a delegation to the 2013 and 2017 contests and broadcast the latter live. Channel 31 also stated its intention to broadcast the contests in 2018 and 2019. Khabar Agency (KA) has been an associate member of the EBU since January 2016.

== Before Junior Eurovision ==
=== National final ===
KA held a national final on 22 September 2018. Ten songs participated in the competition and the winner was selected through a jury and public televote.

==== Competing entries ====
Artists were able to submit their entries between 1 August 2018 and 31 August 2018. From all songs submitted, an eleven-member jury panel selected 10 songs for the competition. The jury panel consisted of Tamara Assar, Mariya Sadvakasova, Erke Esmahan, Kairat Nurtas, Roza Rymbaeva, Alan Azhibayev, Lyalla Sultankyzy, Renat Gaisin, Bagim Mukhitdenova, Meirambek Bespaev and Dimash Kudaibergenov.

Artist	Song	Songwriter(s)
Binura Saudabay	"Arnaý" (Арнау)	P. Dumitrescu
Daneliya Tuleshova	"Òzińe sen" (Өзіңе сен)	Artem Kuzmenkov, Kamila Dairova, Daneliya Tuleshova
Dinar Nadirbekova	"Bul álem ertegideı" (Бұл әлем ертегідей)	E. Komar, Kamila Dairova, Y. Zhukov
Maria Zatvarnitskaya	"Baqytyń men" (Бақытың мен)	A. Duisenov
Meirzhan Zhidebai	"Elester" (Елестер)	A. Mukasheva
Sanat Asuat	"Erekshe" (Ерекше)	M. Kadyrmurat, D. Chabanov
Suikum Kabylbek	"Elge sálem" (Елге сәлем)	A. Segizbayeva, B. Zhelderbayev
Yerzhan Maksim	"Elimdi súıemin" (Елімді сүйемін)	A. Duysenbi, U. Zholdasov
Zere Amirbekova	"Qos qanat" (Қос қанат)	Tetyana Reshetnyak, Kamila Dairova, Zere Amirbekova
Zhanelya Kaldybek	"Álemdi mahabbat saqtaıdy" (Әлемді махаббат сақтайды)	A. Ilyanova, P. Dumitrescu

==== Final ====
The final took place on 22 September 2018 at the Halyk Arena in Almaty, hosted by Maya Bekbaeva, Nursultan Qurman, Marat Oralgazin and Erkebulan Myrzabek. Ten competing acts participated in a televised production where the winner was determined by a 50/50 combination of votes from jury members made up of music professionals and a public telephone vote. The jury panel consisted of Tamara Assar, Mariya Sadvakasova, Erke Esmahan, Kairat Nurtas, Roza Rymbaeva, Alan Azhibayev, Lyalla Sultankyzy, Renat Gaisin, Bagim Mukhitdenova, Meirambek Bespaev and Dimash Kudaibergenov.

The winner was Daneliya Tuleshova with the song "Òzińe sen" (Kazakh Cyrillic: Өзіңе сен;

English: Believe in yourself), which was written by herself, Artem Kuzmenkov, and Kamila Dairova, and composed by Ivan Lopukhov.

Final – 22 September 2018
R/O	Artist	Song	Jury	Televote		Total	Place
R/O	Artist	Song	Jury	Votes	Points	Total	Place
1	Zere Amirbekova	"Qos qanat"	2	—N/a	7	9	8
2	Sanat Asuat	"Erekshe"	3	—N/a	8	11	4
3	Meirzhan Zhidebai	"Elester"	12	—N/a	8	20	2
4	Maria Zatvarnitskaya	"Baqytyń men"	5	—N/a	6	11	5
5	Suikum Kabylbek	"Elge sálem"	1	—N/a	2	3	10
6	Zhanelya Kaldybek	"Álemdi mahabbat saqtaıdy"	7	—N/a	3	10	7
7	Yerzhan Maksim	"Elimdi súıemin"	8	338	10	18	3
8	Dinar Nadirbekova	"Bul álem ertegideı"	4	—N/a	5	9	9
9	Binura Saudabay	"Arnaý"	6	—N/a	4	10	6
10	Daneliya Tuleshova	"Òzińe sen"	10	946	12	22	1

== At Junior Eurovision ==
During the opening ceremony and the running order draw which both took place on 19 November 2018, Kazakhstan was drawn to perform third on 25 November 2018, following Portugal and preceding Albania. She placed 6th, with 171 points.

=== Voting ===
The same voting system that was introduced in the 2017 edition was used, where the results were determined by 50% online voting and 50% jury voting. Every participating broadcaster assembled a national jury that consisted of three music industry professionals and two children aged between 10 and 15 who were citizens of the country they represented. The rankings of those jurors were combined to make an overall top ten.

The online voting consisted of two phases. The first phase of the online voting began on 23 November 2018 when a recap of all the rehearsal performances was shown on the contest's website Junioreurovision.tv before the viewers could vote. After this, voters also had the option to watch longer one-minute clips from each participant's rehearsal. This first round of voting ended on 25 November at 15:59 CET. The second phase of the online voting took place during the live show and began right after the last performance and was open for 15 minutes. International viewers were able to vote for a minimum of three and a maximum of five songs. They were also able to vote for their own country's song. These votes were then turned into points which were determined by the percentage of votes received. For example, if a song received 10% of the votes, it received 10% of the available points.

Points awarded to Kazakhstan
Score	Country
12 points	
10 points	
8 points	Azerbaijan; Macedonia
7 points	Russia
6 points	Belarus; Georgia; Malta
5 points	Netherlands; Serbia; Ukraine
4 points	Albania; Armenia; Ireland
3 points	
2 points	
1 point	
Kazakhstan received 103 points from the online vote

Points awarded by Kazakhstan
Score	Country
12 points	Macedonia
10 points	Italy
8 points	Malta
7 points	Israel
6 points	Ukraine
5 points	Georgia
4 points	Russia
3 points	Australia
2 points	Belarus
1 point	Poland

==== Detailed voting results ====
The following members comprised the Kazakh jury:

- Aruzhan Ardak
- Dinaya
- Galiya Baibossynova
- Mukhammed Ali Zhugunusov
- Renat Gaisin

Detailed voting results from Kazakhstan
Draw	Country	Juror A	Juror B	Juror C	Juror D	Juror E	Rank	Points
01	Ukraine	7	5	5	9	3	5	6
02	Portugal	16	19	17	19	18	19	
03	Kazakhstan							
04	Albania	19	10	18	14	17	17	
05	Russia	9	6	7	8	6	7	4
06	Netherlands	8	18	12	11	16	13	
07	Azerbaijan	15	7	10	13	11	11	
08	Belarus	12	11	6	7	7	9	2
09	Ireland	10	12	15	16	19	16	
10	Serbia	17	14	16	10	13	15	
11	Italy	3	1	2	3	4	2	10
12	Australia	6	9	11	6	10	8	3
13	Georgia	5	8	8	5	8	6	5
14	Israel	2	3	3	12	2	4	7
15	France	11	16	13	17	9	14	
16	Macedonia	1	2	1	2	5	1	12
17	Armenia	13	13	9	15	14	12	
18	Wales	14	17	19	18	15	18	
19	Malta	4	4	4	1	1	3	8
20	Poland	18	15	14	4	12	10	1
