= Armenia in the Junior Eurovision Song Contest 2018 =

- Junior Eurovision Song Contest 2018
- Country: Armenia
- Selection process: Depi Mankakan Evratesil 2018
- Selection date: Semi-finals; 9 September 2018; 16 September 2018; Final; 22 September 2018

Competing entry
- Song: "L.E.V.O.N"
- Artist: L.E.V.O.N
- Songwriters: Artem Valter

Placement
- Final result: 9th, 125 points

Participation chronology

Armenia was represented at the Junior Eurovision Song Contest 2018 which took place on 25 November 2018 in Minsk, Belarus. The Armenian broadcaster Armenian Public Television (ARMTV) is responsible for organising their entry for the contest.

== Background ==
Prior to the 2018 contest, Armenia had participated in the Junior Eurovision Song Contest eleven times since its first entry in 2007, with their best result being in 2010 when they won with the song "Mama", performed by Vladimir Arzumanyan. Armenia went on to host the Junior Eurovision Song Contest 2011 in the Armenian capital Yerevan.

== Before Junior Eurovision ==
=== Depi Mankakan Evratesil 2018 ===
Depi Makankan Evratesil 2018 (Armenian: Դեպի Մանկական Եվրատեսիլ 2018; "Towards Junior Eurovision 2018") was the first edition of the national final Depi Makankan Evratesil and selected the Armenian entry for the Junior Eurovision Song Contest 2018. The competition commenced on 9 September 2018 with the first of two semi-finals and concluded with a winning song and artist during the final on 22 September 2018. All shows in the competition took place at the AMPTV studios in Yerevan, broadcast on Armenia 1 as well as online via the broadcaster's website 1tv.am. Mika and Dalita were the hosts

==== Competing entries ====
The 23 selected singers were revealed in July 2018. The first 12 competing entries were revealed on 30 August 2018, with the remaining 12 revealed a day later.

Artist	Song	Songwriter(s)
Anahit Arakelyan	"Shabadibam" (Շաբադիբամ)	Armen Virabyan
Ani	"Angels"	Hasmik Melqonyan
Anna	"1 2 3 4"	Nick Egibyan
Arpi	"Par" (Պար)	Tigran Petrosyan, Ada Simonyan
Gor X	"Why Don't"	Gor X
Eliza	"Im Erazanq" (Իմ երազանք)	Tigran Avetisyan, Liana Torosyan
Erik	"Ari Pari" (Արի պարի)	Nick Egibyan
Lia	"Kamac-Kamac" (Կամաց-կամաց)	Nick Egibyan, Vladimir Poghosyan
Lili	"Payqar" (Պայքար)	Egine, Anna Danielyan
L.E.V.O.N	"L.E.V.O.N"	Artem Valter
Harut Harutyunyan	"Amar e" (Ամառ է)	Artem Valter
Maria Petrosyan	"Happy Birthday"	Nick Egibyan
Melisa	"Qameleon" (Քամելեոն)	David Badalyan
Yurahatuk	"Yurahatuk" (Յուրահատուկ)	Miqayel Margaryan
Nare Elizbaryan	"Du karox es" (Դու կարող ես)	Susanna Barseghyan
Sati	"Insta" (Ինստա)	Nick Egibyan
Sekunda	"Qez im Yerevan" (Քեզ իմ Երևան)	Karen Ananyan, Armine Grigoryan
Serj Araqelyan	"Good Mood"	Grigor Kyokchyan
Silva Grigoryan	"Poqrik Zinvor" (Փոքրիկ զինվոր)	Richard Madlenyan, Grigor Kyokchyan
Vahagn Mesrobyan	"Es Ekel Em" (Ես եկել եմ)	Susanna Barseghyan
Vardan Margaryan	"Janaparh" (Ճանապարհ)	Mane Hakobyan, Avet Barseghyan
Vova	"Leggo"	Martin Mirzoyan, Grigor Kyokchyan
1+1	"Misht Miasin" (Միշտ միասին)	Qristine Davtyan

==== Semi-finals ====
The semi-finals were held on 9 and 16 September 2018. Eleven artists took part in the first semi-final and twelve took part in the second semi-final, and five entries from both qualified to the grand final. Following both a public and a jury vote of two categories (adult and kids jury), the set of finalists was determined.

Key:

Qualifier

Semi-final 1 – 9 September 2018
Draw	Artist	Song	Adult Jury		Kids Jury		Televote		Total	Place
Draw	Artist	Song	Votes	Points	Votes	Points	Votes	Points	Total	Place
1	Anna	"1 2 3 4"	33	7	42	8	306	4	19	6
2	Arpi	"Par"	26	4	27	6	280	3	13	8
3	Nare Elizbaryan	"Du karox es"	27	5	9	1	498	7	13	7
4	Gor X	"Why Don't"	19	2	16	3	216	2	7	11
5	Vardan Margaryan	"Janaparh"	41	9	47	10	1,383	11	30	1
6	1+1	"Misht miasin"	11	1	14	2	572	9	12	9
7	Eliza	"Im Erazanq"	29	6	26	5	659	10	21	4
8	Ani	"Angels"	36	8	40	7	393	5	20	5
9	Maria Petrosyan	"Happy Birthday"	24	3	17	4	147	1	8	10
10	L.E.V.O.N	"L.E.V.O.N"	43	11	48	11	536	8	30	1
11	Lia	"Kamac-Kamac"	41	9	44	9	486	6	24	3

Detailed Adult Jury votes
Draw	Song	Jury 1	Jury 2	Jury 3	Jury 4	Jury 5	Total
1	"1 2 3 4"	11	3	10	8	1	33
2	"Par"	2	2	8	3	11	26
3	"Du karox es"	8	8	2	7	2	27
4	"Why Don't"	6	4	3	2	4	19
5	"Janaparh"	3	9	9	11	9	41
6	"Misht miasin"	1	5	1	1	3	11
7	"Im Erazanq"	7	6	5	6	5	29
8	"Angels"	4	10	7	5	10	36
9	"Happy Birthday"	5	1	6	4	8	24
10	"L.E.V.O.N"	9	7	11	10	6	43
11	"Kamac-Kamac"	10	11	4	9	7	41

Detailed Kids Jury votes
Draw	Song	Jury 1	Jury 2	Jury 3	Jury 4	Jury 5	Total
1	"1 2 3 4"	11	4	8	8	11	42
2	"Par"	3	8	5	6	5	27
3	"Du karox es"	4	2	1	1	1	9
4	"Why Don't"	2	3	3	2	6	16
5	"Janaparh"	7	10	10	10	10	47
6	"Misht miasin"	5	1	2	4	2	14
7	"Im Erazanq"	6	6	6	5	3	26
8	"Angels"	9	9	7	7	8	40
9	"Happy Birthday"	1	5	4	3	4	17
10	"L.E.V.O.N"	10	11	11	9	7	48
11	"Kamac-Kamac"	8	7	9	11	9	44

Semi-final 2 – 16 September 2018
Draw	Artist	Song	Adult Jury		Kids Jury		Televote		Total	Place
Draw	Artist	Song	Votes	Points	Votes	Points	Votes	Points	Total	Place
1	Sati	"Insta"	47	11	41	8	190	1	20	6
2	Serj Araqelyan	"Good Mood"	34	7	48	11	350	5	23	3
3	Silva Grigoryan	"Poqrik Zinvor"	29	5	27	4	513	10	19	7
4	Yurahatuk	"Yurahatuk"	13	2	14	2	225	3	7	12
5	Vova	"Leggo"	49	12	38	7	991	12	31	1
6	Lili	"Payqar"	43	9	50	12	277	4	25	2
7	Sekunda	"Qez im Yerevan"	28	4	20	3	373	6	13	10
8	Melisa	"Qameleon"	26	3	28	5	541	11	19	7
9	Vahagn Mesrobyan	"Es Ekel Em"	10	1	6	1	456	8	10	11
10	Erik	"Ari Pari"	43	9	41	8	201	2	19	9
11	Anahit Arakelyan	"Shabadibam"	39	8	36	6	394	7	21	5
12	Harut Harutyunyan	"Amar e"	29	5	41	8	479	9	22	4

Detailed Adult Jury votes
Draw	Song	Jury 1	Jury 2	Jury 3	Jury 4	Jury 5	Total
1	"Insta"	10	5	10	11	11	47
2	"Good Mood"	8	6	3	9	8	34
3	"Poqrik Zinvor"	1	8	6	8	6	29
4	"Yurahatuk"	2	2	4	3	2	13
5	"Leggo"	11	12	12	4	10	49
6	"Payqar"	9	10	5	12	7	43
7	"Qez im Yerevan"	7	7	8	5	1	28
8	"Qameleon"	6	9	1	6	4	26
9	"Es Ekel Em"	3	1	2	1	3	10
10	"Ari Pari"	12	4	11	7	9	43
11	"Shabadibam"	5	11	9	2	12	39
12	"Amar e"	4	3	7	10	5	29

Detailed Kids Jury votes
Draw	Song	Jury 1	Jury 2	Jury 3	Jury 4	Jury 5	Total
1	"Insta"	11	10	7	10	3	41
2	"Good Mood"	10	7	9	12	10	48
3	"Poqrik Zinvor"	7	3	4	6	7	27
4	"Yurahatuk"	3	4	3	2	2	14
5	"Leggo"	6	9	12	3	8	38
6	"Payqar"	12	11	5	11	11	50
7	"Qez im Yerevan"	1	2	2	9	6	20
8	"Qameleon"	5	8	6	5	4	28
9	"Es Ekel Em"	2	1	1	1	1	6
10	"Ari Pari"	8	6	11	4	12	41
11	"Shabadibam"	4	5	10	8	9	36
12	"Amar e"	9	12	8	7	5	41

==== Final ====
The final was held on 22 September 2018. Following both a public and a jury vote of two categories (adult and kids jury), L.E.V.O.N was ultimately selected to represent Armenia in the Junior Eurovision Song Contest 2018.

Final – 22 September 2018
Draw	Artist	Song	Adult Jury		Kids Jury		Televote		Total	Place
Draw	Artist	Song	Total	Points	Total	Points	Votes	Points	Total	Place
1	Lia	"Kamac-Kamac"	14	1	25	4	706	4	9	9
2	Anahit Arakelyan	"Shabadibam"	29	7	11	1	532	3	11	8
3	Harut Harutyunyan	"Amar e"	18	2	17	2	530	2	6	10
4	Lily	"Payqar"	18	2	34	8	762	5	15	5
5	Vova	"Leggo"	42	9	26	5	1,564	9	23	3
6	Serj Araqelyan	"Good Mood"	24	5	31	7	437	1	13	6
7	Vardan Margaryan	"Janaparh"	36	8	34	8	2,423	10	26	2
8	Eliza	"Im Erazanq"	18	2	19	3	836	7	12	7
9	L.E.V.O.N	"L.E.V.O.N"	49	10	48	10	1,547	8	28	1
10	Ani	"Angels"	27	6	30	6	808	6	18	4

Detailed Adult Jury votes
Draw	Song	Jury 1	Jury 2	Jury 3	Jury 4	Jury 5	Total
1	"Kamac-Kamac"	3	2	2	1	6	14
2	"Shabadibam"	5	4	10	6	4	29
3	"Amar e"	4	1	4	4	5	18
4	"Payqar"	1	5	5	5	2	18
5	"Leggo"	9	9	7	9	8	42
6	"Good Mood"	7	7	6	3	1	24
7	"Janaparh"	8	8	3	8	9	36
8	"Im Erazanq"	6	6	1	2	3	18
9	"L.E.V.O.N"	10	10	9	10	10	49
10	"Angels"	2	3	8	7	7	27

Detailed Kids Jury votes
Draw	Song	Jury 1	Jury 2	Jury 3	Jury 4	Jury 5	Total
1	"Kamac-Kamac"	6	2	5	5	7	25
2	"Shabadibam"	2	1	6	1	1	11
3	"Amar e"	1	3	4	3	6	17
4	"Payqar"	8	8	2	6	10	34
5	"Leggo"	5	7	9	2	3	26
6	"Good Mood"	4	6	7	9	5	31
7	"Janaparh"	7	9	8	8	2	34
8	"Im Erazanq"	3	4	1	7	4	19
9	"L.E.V.O.N"	10	10	10	10	8	48
10	"Angels"	9	5	3	4	9	30

== Artist and song information ==
Levon Galstyan
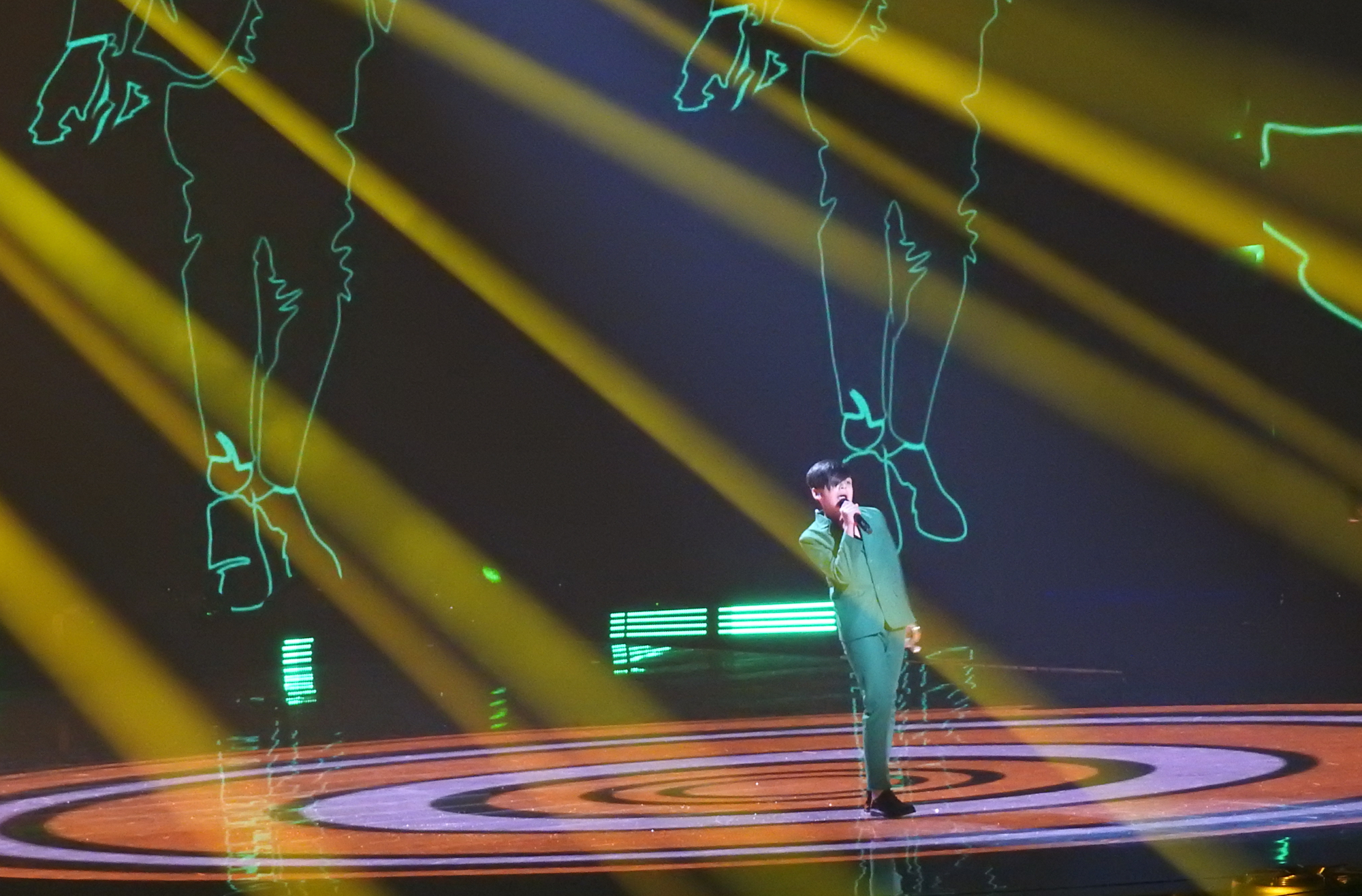

Background information
- Also known as: L.E.V.O.N
- Born: 20 May 2006 (age 19)
- Genres: Pop
- Occupation: Singer
- Instrument: Vocals
- Years active: 2014–present

(Armenia) "L.E.V.O.N"
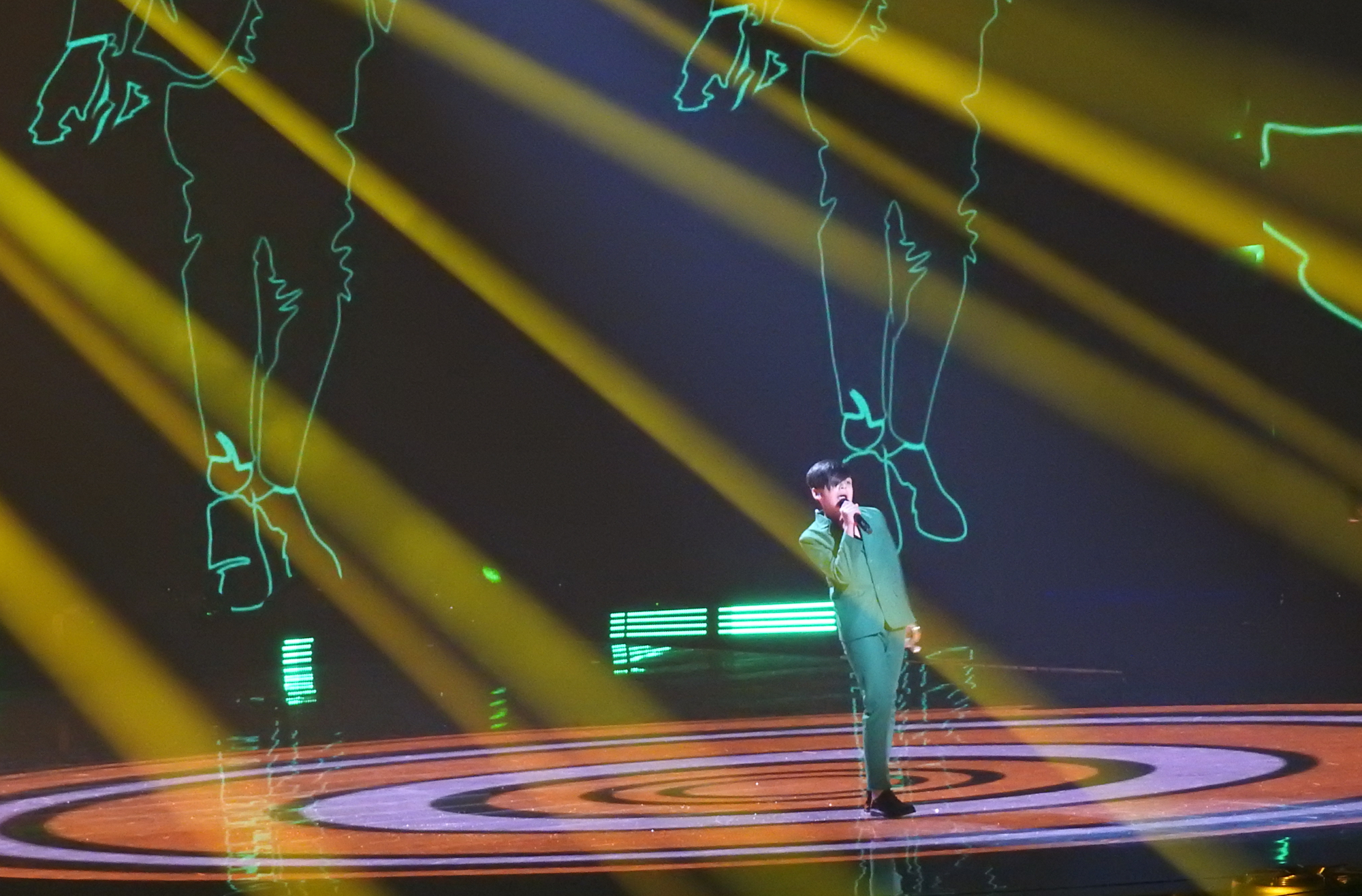

Junior Eurovision Song Contest 2018 entry
- Country: Armenia
- Artist: Levon Galstyan
- As: L.E.V.O.N
- Language: Armenian
- Composer: Artem Valter
- Lyricist: Artem Valter

Finals performance
- Final result: 9th
- Final points: 125

Entry chronology
- ◄ "Boomerang" (2017)
- "Colours of Your Dream" (2019) ►

=== Levon Galstyan ===
Levon Galstyan (born on 20 May 2006) is an Armenian-Russian child singer. He represented Armenia at the Junior Eurovision Song Contest 2018 with the song "L.E.V.O.N".

Levon is no stranger to singing competitions, as in 2016 he participated in The Voice Kids Russia, where he was coached by Valeriy Meladze. Since then, he has taken part in local and international competitions, including New Wave in Russia as part of The Voices of Artsakh.

=== L.E.V.O.N ===
"L.E.V.O.N" is a song by Armenian-Russian child singer Levon Galstyan. He represented Armenia at the Junior Eurovision Song Contest 2018, finishing in 9th place with 125 points.

== At Junior Eurovision ==
During the opening ceremony and the running order draw which both took place on 19 November 2018, Armenia was drawn to perform seventeenth on 25 November 2018, following Macedonia and preceding Wales.

=== Voting ===
The same voting system that was introduced in the 2017 edition was used, where the results were determined by 50% online voting and 50% jury voting. Every participating broadcaster assembled a national jury that consisted of three music industry professionals and two children aged between 10 and 15 who were citizens of the country they represented. The rankings of those jurors were combined to make an overall top ten.

The online voting consisted of two phases. The first phase of the online voting began on 23 November 2018 when a recap of all the rehearsal performances was shown on the contest's website Junioreurovision.tv before the viewers could vote. After this, voters also had the option to watch longer one-minute clips from each participant's rehearsal. This first round of voting ended on 25 November at 15:59 CET. The second phase of the online voting took place during the live show and began right after the last performance and was open for 15 minutes. International viewers were able to vote for a minimum of three and a maximum of five songs. They were also able to vote for their own country's song. These votes were then turned into points which were determined by the percentage of votes received. For example, if a song received 10% of the votes, it received 10% of the available points.

Points awarded to Armenia
Score	Country
12 points	
10 points	
8 points	France
7 points	Malta
6 points	Australia; Netherlands; Portugal
5 points	Belarus
4 points	Israel; Poland
3 points	Albania; Italy; Ukraine
2 points	
1 point	
Armenia received 70 points from the online vote

Points awarded by Armenia
Score	Country
12 points	Belarus
10 points	Russia
8 points	Georgia
7 points	Australia
6 points	Netherlands
5 points	Macedonia
4 points	Kazakhstan
3 points	Malta
2 points	Ukraine
1 point	France

==== Detailed voting results ====
Detailed voting results from Armenia
Draw	Country	Juror A	Juror B	Juror C	Juror D	Juror E	Rank	Points
01	Ukraine	7	10	11	5	15	9	2
02	Portugal	16	14	17	18	10	17	
03	Kazakhstan	8	6	7	8	16	7	4
04	Albania	10	15	14	16	5	13	
05	Russia	2	4	2	4	1	2	10
06	Netherlands	11	1	5	11	7	5	6
07	Azerbaijan	19	19	19	19	19	19	
08	Belarus	1	2	3	2	3	1	12
09	Ireland	18	18	9	17	17	18	
10	Serbia	15	8	16	15	8	14	
11	Italy	9	11	15	10	11	11	
12	Australia	6	5	1	3	13	4	7
13	Georgia	3	3	4	1	2	3	8
14	Israel	4	12	12	13	18	12	
15	France	13	16	6	6	12	10	1
16	Macedonia	5	13	10	12	4	6	5
17	Armenia							
18	Wales	17	7	13	14	14	16	
19	Malta	12	9	8	9	6	8	3
20	Poland	14	17	18	7	9	15	
