= Russia in the Junior Eurovision Song Contest 2018 =

- Junior Eurovision Song Contest 2018
- Country: Russia
- Selection process: Akademiya Eurovision
- Selection date: 3 June 2018

Competing entry
- Song: "Unbreakable"
- Artist: Anna Filipchuk
- Songwriters: Taras Demchuk

Placement
- Final result: 10th, 122 points

Participation chronology

Russia was represented at the Junior Eurovision Song Contest 2018 which took place on 25 November 2018 in Minsk, Belarus.

== Background ==
Prior to the 2018 Contest, Russia had participated in the Junior Eurovision Song Contest thirteen times since its debut in 2005. Russia have participated at every contest since its debut, and have won the contest two times in 2006 with the song "Vesenniy Jazz", performed by Tolmachevy Twins. The twin sisters went on to become the first act from a Junior Eurovision Song Contest to represent their country at the Eurovision Song Contest, performing the song "Shine" at the Eurovision Song Contest 2014, in Copenhagen, Denmark. In the 2017 contest, Polina Bogusevich represented her country in Tbilisi, Georgia with the song "Wings".She won the contest with a total of 188 points.

== Before Junior Eurovision ==
=== Akademiya Eurovision 2018 ===
The Russian national final took place on 3 June 2018 at the children's camp Artek, on the Crimean Peninsula. However, it aired the next day on Carousel. The 10 finalists were selected through internal castings acting as a semi-final. On 5 April 2018, all the participants were announced. The entries had been released on 27 May 2018.

==== Final ====
The national final was won by the 13-year-old Anna Filipchuk with the song "Nepobedimy".

Final – 3 June 2018
| Draw | Artist | Song | Percentage | Place |
|---|---|---|---|---|
| 1 | Arkadiy Yevtushenko | "Ya zdes" (Я здесь) | 9.80% | 2 |
| 2 | DoDoStar | "Poslushay" (Послушай) | 9.23% | 3 |
| 3 | Ivan Starikov | "Neutomimye" (Неутомимые) | 9.13% | 4 |
| 4 | Elizaveta Kuklishina | "Mechta moya" (Мечта моя) | 7.60% | 10 |
| 5 | Aleksandra Kirilchuk | "Family Tree" | 7.79% | 8 |
| 6 | Diana Smykova | "Barabum" (Барабум) | 7.69% | 9 |
| 7 | Tatyana Melnichenko | "Schastye na ladonyakh" (Счастье на ладонях) | 7.88% | 7 |
| 8 | Anna Yakubuk | "Vselennaya" (Вселенная) | 8.85% | 5 |
| 9 | Michelle Zadorozhnaya | "Podelis mechtoy" (Поделись мечтой) | 6.64% | 12 |
| 10 | Matreshki | "Vso mezhdu nami" (Всё между нами) | 7.31% | 11 |
| 11 | Anna Filipchuk | "Nepobedimy" (Непобедимы) | 9.91% | 1 |
| 12 | Evelina Mazurina | "Poy dushoy" (Пой душой) | 8.17% | 6 |

== Artist and song information ==
Anna Filipchuk
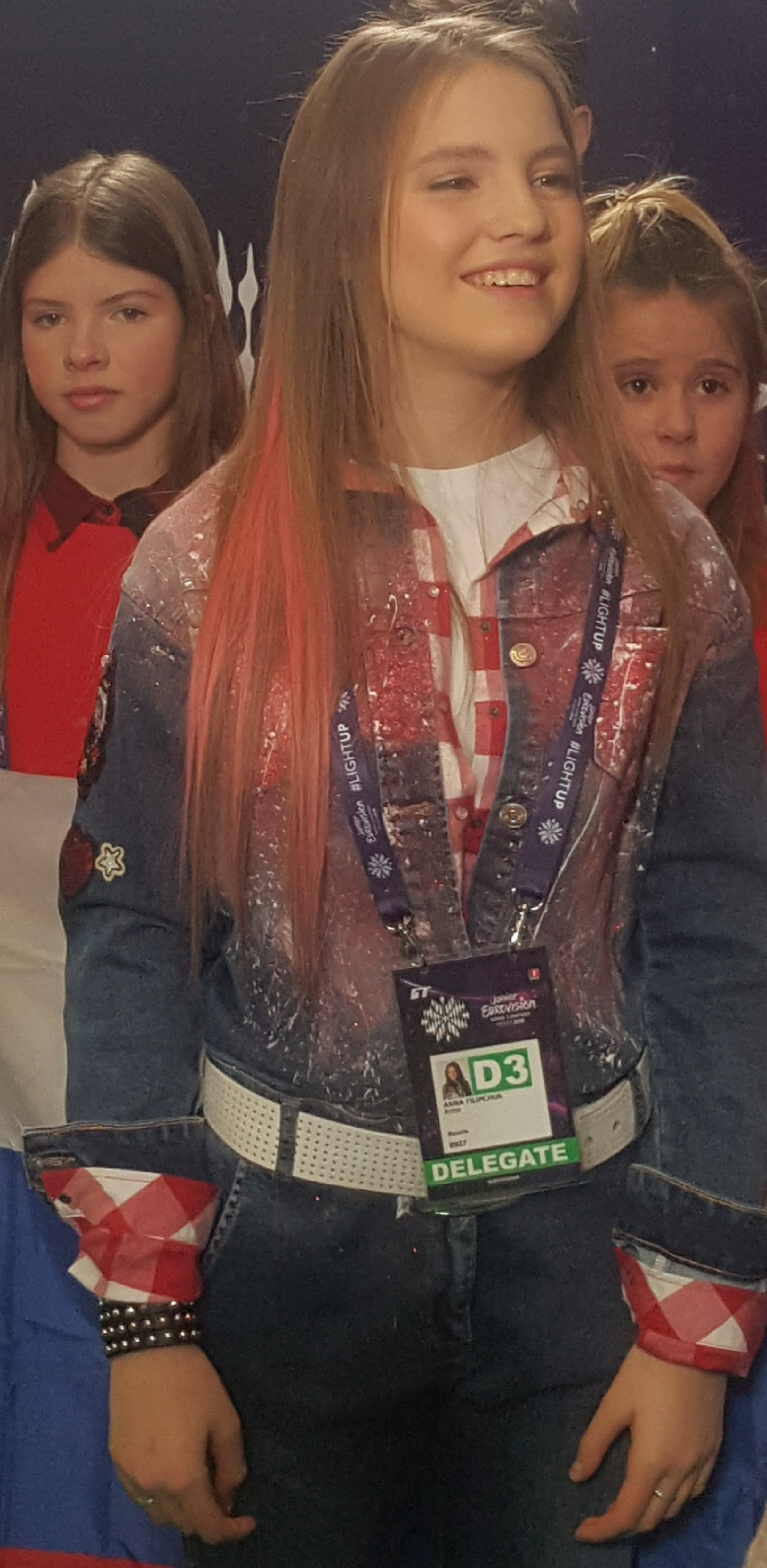

Background information
- Born: 9 November 2004 (age 21); Barnaul, Russia
- Occupation: Singer
- Instrument: Vocals

(Russia) "Unbreakable"
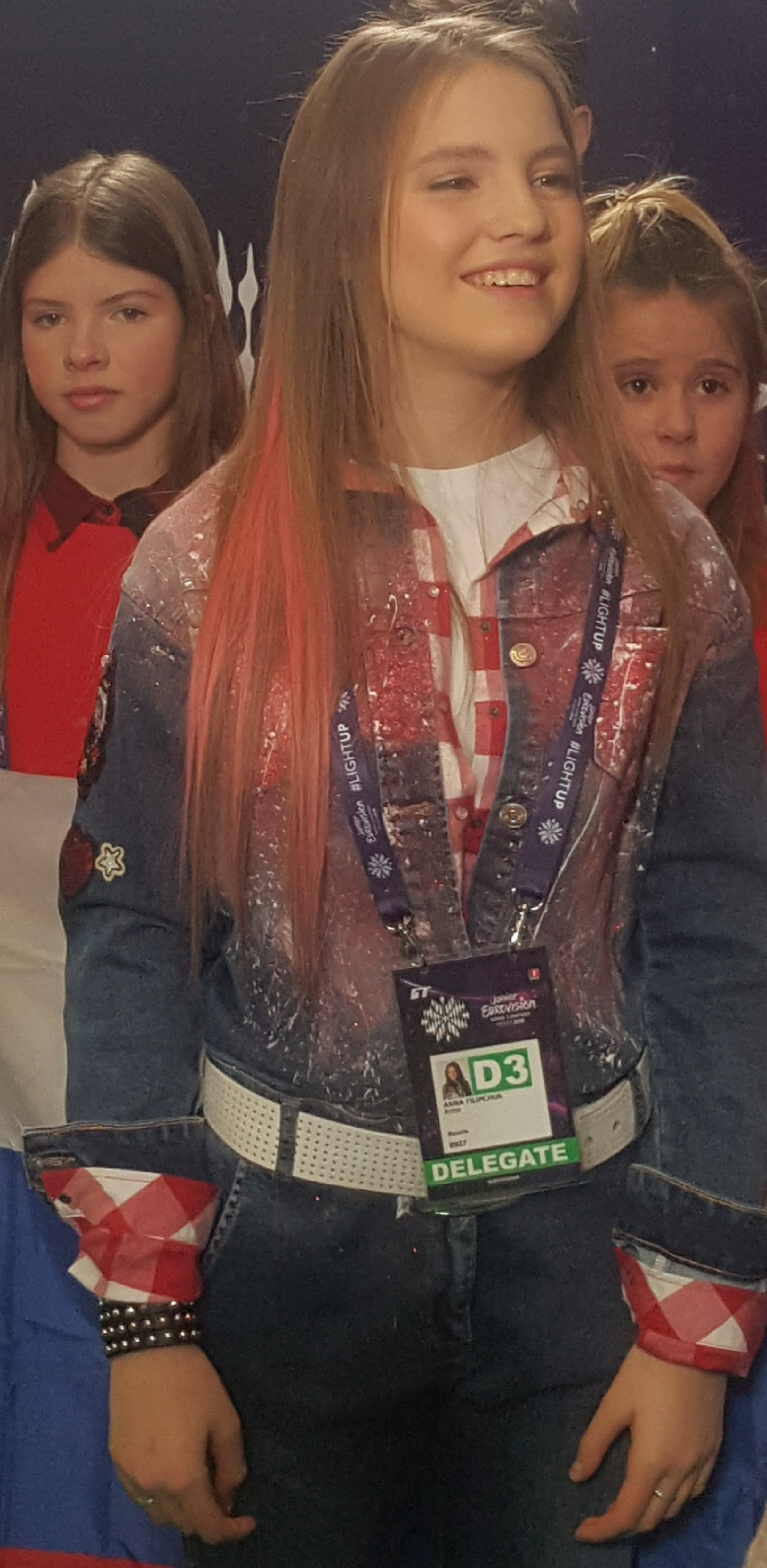

Junior Eurovision Song Contest 2018 entry
- Country: Russia
- Artist: Anna Filipchuk
- Languages: Russian; English

Entry chronology
- ◄ "Wings" (2017)
- "A Time for Us" (2019) ►

=== Anna Filipchuk ===
Anna Filipchuk (Russian: Анна Филипчук; born 9 November 2004) is a Russian child singer and TV presenter. She represented Russia in the Junior Eurovision Song Contest 2018 with the song "Unbreakable".

Anna currently studies at the Igor Krutoy Academy, alongside practising rhythmic gymnastics. As well as singing, the young star has experience in TV presenting.

=== Unbreakable ===
"Unbreakable" (Russian: Непобедимы, Nepobedimy) is a song by the Russian child singer Anna Filipchuk. It represented Russia at the Junior Eurovision Song Contest 2018 placing 10th with 122 points.

== At Junior Eurovision ==
During the opening ceremony and the running order draw which both took place on 19 November 2018, Russia was drawn to perform fifth on 25 November 2018, following Albania and preceding the Netherlands.

=== Voting ===
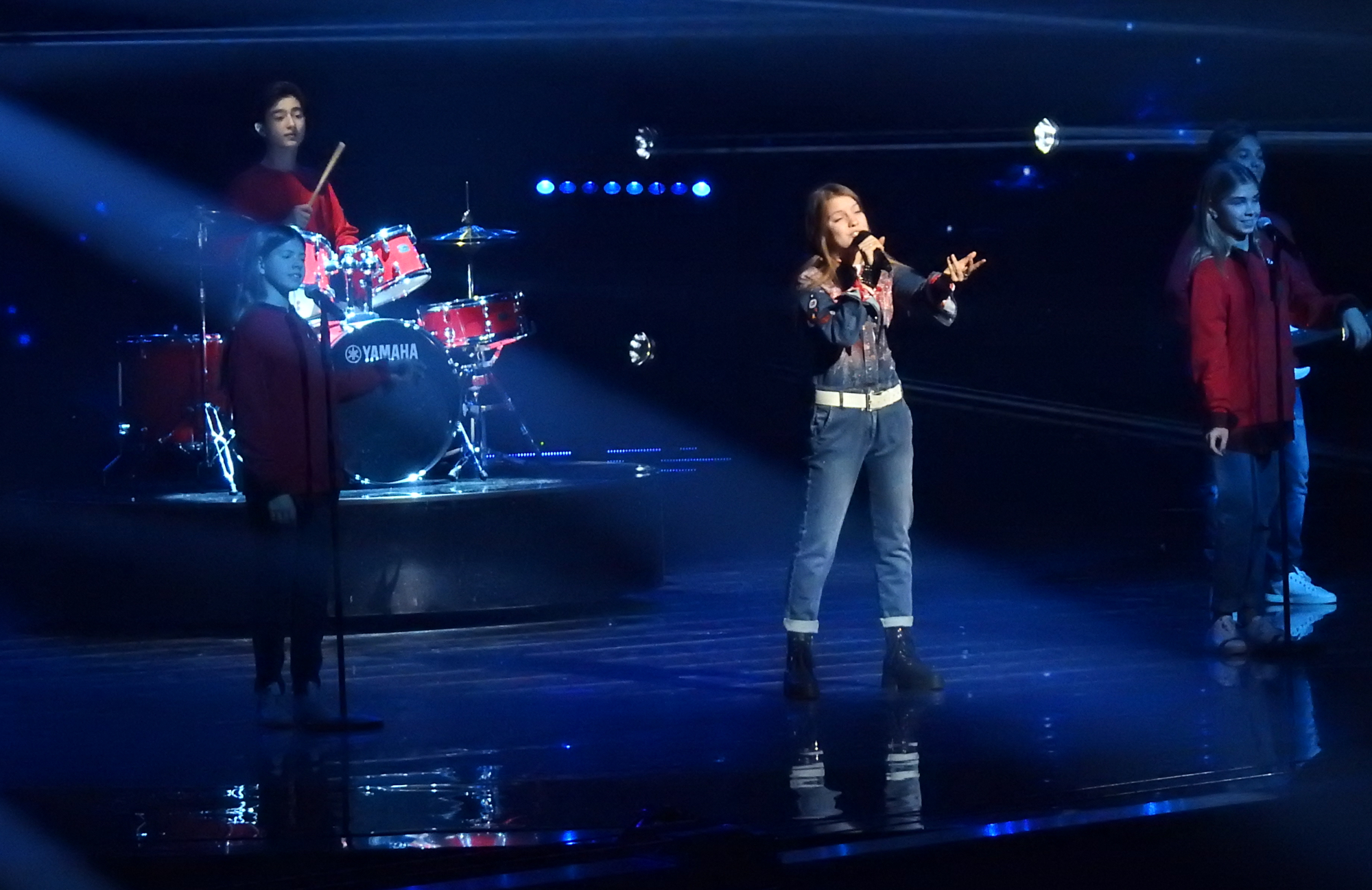
Anna Filipchuk during rehearsal for Junior Eurovision Song Contest 2018 in Minsk

The same voting system that was introduced in the 2017 edition was used, where the results were determined by 50% online voting and 50% jury voting. Every participating broadcaster assembled a national jury that consisted of three music industry professionals and two children aged between 10 and 15 who were citizens of the country they represented. The rankings of those jurors were combined to make an overall top ten.

The online voting consisted of two phases. The first phase of the online voting began on 23 November 2018 when a recap of all the rehearsal performances was shown on the contest's website Junioreurovision.tv before the viewers could vote. After this, voters also had the option to watch longer one-minute clips from each participant's rehearsal. This first round of voting ended on 25 November at 15:59 CET. The second phase of the online voting took place during the live show and began right after the last performance and was open for 15 minutes. International viewers were able to vote for a minimum of three and a maximum of five songs. They were also able to vote for their own country's song. These votes were then turned into points which were determined by the percentage of votes received. For example, if a song received 10% of the votes, it received 10% of the available points.

Points awarded to Russia
| Score | Country |
|---|---|
| 12 points | Azerbaijan |
| 10 points | Armenia |
| 8 points | Australia |
| 7 points | Wales |
| 6 points | Poland |
| 5 points | Israel |
| 4 points | Kazakhstan |
| 3 points | Netherlands |
| 2 points | Belarus; Malta |
| 1 point | Portugal |
Russia received 62 points from the online vote

Points awarded by Russia
| Score | Country |
|---|---|
| 12 points | Georgia |
| 10 points | Australia |
| 8 points | Malta |
| 7 points | Kazakhstan |
| 6 points | France |
| 5 points | Israel |
| 4 points | Poland |
| 3 points | Ukraine |
| 2 points | Netherlands |
| 1 point | Macedonia |

==== Detailed voting results ====
Detailed voting results from Russia
| Draw | Country | Juror A | Juror B | Juror C | Juror D | Juror E | Rank | Points |
|---|---|---|---|---|---|---|---|---|
| 01 | Ukraine | 10 | 5 | 9 | 17 | 7 | 8 | 3 |
| 02 | Portugal | 19 | 18 | 17 | 18 | 19 | 19 | |
| 03 | Kazakhstan | 3 | 4 | 4 | 4 | 2 | 4 | 7 |
| 04 | Albania | 15 | 12 | 10 | 10 | 10 | 13 | |
| 05 | Russia | | | | | | | |
| 06 | Netherlands | 7 | 6 | 16 | 15 | 6 | 9 | 2 |
| 07 | Azerbaijan | 13 | 19 | 11 | 9 | 8 | 15 | |
| 08 | Belarus | 6 | 13 | 18 | 16 | 5 | 14 | |
| 09 | Ireland | 17 | 16 | 15 | 14 | 17 | 17 | |
| 10 | Serbia | 16 | 15 | 14 | 19 | 11 | 16 | |
| 11 | Italy | 12 | 11 | 13 | 11 | 9 | 12 | |
| 12 | Australia | 2 | 7 | 2 | 2 | 4 | 2 | 10 |
| 13 | Georgia | 8 | 1 | 1 | 1 | 3 | 1 | 12 |
| 14 | Israel | 14 | 2 | 7 | 5 | 15 | 6 | 5 |
| 15 | France | 11 | 3 | 6 | 3 | 16 | 5 | 6 |
| 16 | Macedonia | 5 | 14 | 8 | 8 | 14 | 10 | 1 |
| 17 | Armenia | 9 | 8 | 12 | 12 | 12 | 11 | |
| 18 | Wales | 18 | 17 | 19 | 13 | 18 | 18 | |
| 19 | Malta | 1 | 10 | 3 | 6 | 1 | 3 | 8 |
| 20 | Poland | 4 | 9 | 5 | 7 | 13 | 7 | 4 |
