= Belarus in the Junior Eurovision Song Contest 2018 =

- Junior Eurovision Song Contest 2018
- Country: Belarus
- Selection process: National final
- Selection date: 31 August 2018

Competing entry
- Song: "Time"
- Artist: Daniel Yastremski
- Songwriters: Kirill Good; Roman Kolodko

Placement
- Final result: 11th, 114 points

Participation chronology

Belarus was represented at the Junior Eurovision Song Contest 2018 which took place in Minsk, Belarus on 25 November 2018. The Belarusian entry for the 2018 contest was selected through a national final organised by the Belarusian broadcaster National State Television and Radio Company of the Republic of Belarus. It saw ten competing acts participating in a televised production where the winner was determined by a 50/50 combination of votes from a jury made up of music professionals and a public vote.

== Background ==
Prior to the 2018 contest, Belarus had participated in the Junior Eurovision Song Contest fifteen times since its first entry at the inaugural contest in 2003. Belarus have taken part in every edition of the contest since 2003, and have won the contest twice: in 2005 with Ksenia Sitnik performing the song "My vmeste"; and again in 2007 with Alexey Zhigalkovich performing the entry "S druz'yami". The country previously hosted the 2010 contest in Minsk and will host for a second year in 2018. In 2017, Helena Meraai represented Belarus in Tbilisi, Georgia with the song "I Am the One". It ended in 5th place with 149 points.

== Before Junior Eurovision ==
=== National final ===
The national final took place on 31 August 2018 at the "600 Metrov" studio in Minsk. It was mainly hosted by Olga Ryzhikova and 2014 Belarusian Eurovision contestant Teo, while Helena Meraai and Ruslan Aslanov were hosts in the green room. Ten competing acts participated in a televised production where the winner was determined by a 50/50 combination of both telephone vote and the votes of a jury made up of music professionals.

The members of the jury were Nataliya Tamelo, Tatyana Parhamovitch, Olga Salamakha, Evgeny Perlin, Aleks David, Igor Melnikov and Olga Vronskaya.

Final – 31 August 2018

Draw	Artist	Song	Jury	Televote		Total	Place
1	Myata	"Odnazhdy" (Однажды)	1	4,027	8	9	9
2	Daniel Yastremski	"Time"	4	9,237	12	16	1
3	Lizameya	"Zorka" (Зорка)	3	3,853	7	10	7
4	Artem Skorol	"Ulybnis" (Улыбнись)	7	1,629	4	11	6
5	Angelina Yaroshchuk	"Feeling Good"	2	1,885	6	8	10
6	Monkey Tops	"Na stile" (На стиле)	10	1,251	2	12	5
7	Maria Zhilina	"Welcome to My Belarus"	5	5,305	10	15	2
8	Yaroslav Sokolikov	"Mir na zemle" (Мир на Земле)	8	1,788	5	13	4
9	Nikita Belko	"Ne preday" (Не предай)	12	906	1	13	3
10	Mariya Gulevich	"Ostrov Chikarum" (Остров Чикарум)	6	1,462	3	9	8

== Artist and song information ==
Daniel Yastremski
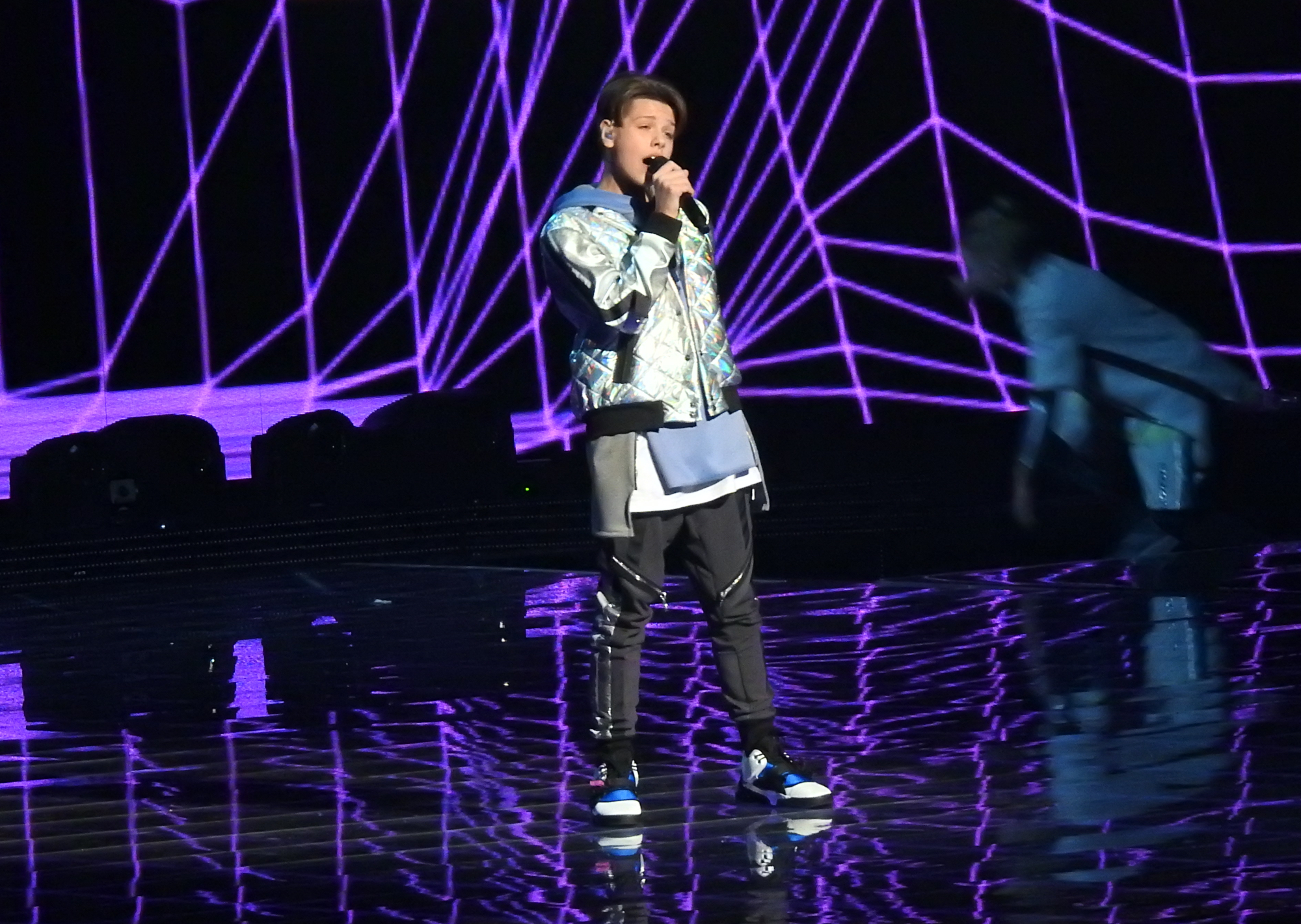

Background information
- Born: Daniel Aleks Yastremski; 12 February 2004 (age 22); Cincinnati, Ohio, U.S.
- Origin: Belarus
- Genres: Pop
- Occupation: Singer
- Instrument: Vocals

(Belarus) "Time"
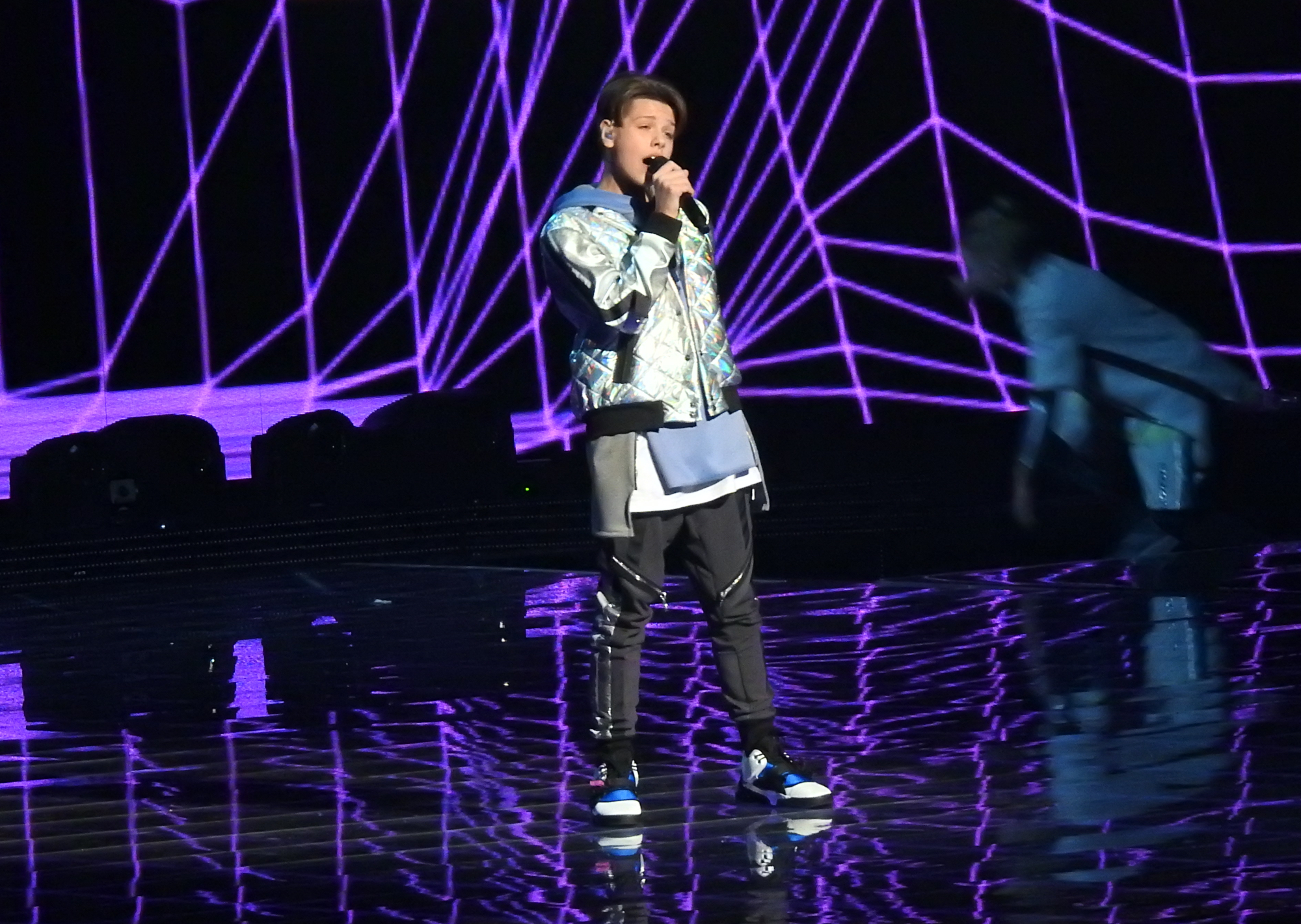

Junior Eurovision Song Contest 2018 entry
- Country: Belarus
- Languages: Russian; English
- Composer: Kirill Good
- Lyricist: Roman Kolodko

Finals performance
- Final result: 11th
- Final points: 114

Entry chronology
- ◄ "I Am the One" (2017)
- "Pepelny (Ashen)" (2019) ►

=== Daniel Yastremski ===
Daniel Aleks Yastremski (born 12 February 2004 in Cincinnati) is an American-born Belarusian singer. He represented Belarus at the Junior Eurovision Song Contest 2018 with the song "Time", finishing eleventh.

Daniel Yastremski was born in Cincinnati, Ohio, USA on 12 February 2004. He moved to Minsk as a small child and has been taking part in music lessons since he was six years old. Since then he has taken part in numerous competitions and represented Belarus at New Wave Junior in 2017.

=== Time ===
"Time" is a song by Belarusian singer Daniel Yastremski. It represented Belarus at the Junior Eurovision Song Contest 2018. The song placed 11th with 114 points.

== At Junior Eurovision ==
During the opening ceremony and the running order draw which both took place on 19 November 2018, Belarus was drawn to perform eighth on 25 November 2018, following Azerbaijan and preceding Ireland.

=== Voting ===
The same voting system that was introduced in the 2017 edition was used, where the results were determined by 50% online voting and 50% jury voting. Every participating broadcaster assembled a national jury that consisted of three music industry professionals and two children aged between 10 and 15 who were citizens of the country they represented. The rankings of those jurors were combined to make an overall top ten.

The online voting consisted of two phases. The first phase of the online voting began on 23 November 2018 when a recap of all the rehearsal performances was shown on the contest's website Junioreurovision.tv before the viewers could vote. After this, voters also had the option to watch longer one-minute clips from each participant's rehearsal. This first round of voting ended on 25 November at 15:59 CET. The second phase of the online voting took place during the live show and began right after the last performance and was open for 15 minutes. International viewers were able to vote for a minimum of three and a maximum of five songs. They were also able to vote for their own country's song. These votes were then turned into points which were determined by the percentage of votes received. For example, if a song received 10% of the votes, it received 10% of the available points.

Points awarded to Belarus
Score	Country
12 points	Armenia
10 points	Azerbaijan; Malta; Portugal
8 points	Netherlands
7 points	
6 points	
5 points	Italy
4 points	
3 points	
2 points	Ireland; Kazakhstan
1 point	Australia; Georgia
Belarus received 53 points from the online vote

Points awarded by Belarus
Score	Country
12 points	Australia
10 points	Malta
8 points	France
7 points	Italy
6 points	Kazakhstan
5 points	Armenia
4 points	Poland
3 points	Ukraine
2 points	Russia
1 point	Macedonia

==== Detailed voting results ====
Detailed voting results from Belarus
Draw	Country	Juror A	Juror B	Juror C	Juror D	Juror E	Rank	Points
01	Ukraine	3	9	10	9	6	8	3
02	Portugal	18	18	17	19	19	19	
03	Kazakhstan	13	2	9	2	4	5	6
04	Albania	15	15	19	11	14	16	
05	Russia	1	10	18	14	10	9	2
06	Netherlands	14	14	15	15	7	13	
07	Azerbaijan	11	13	13	18	13	15	
08	Belarus							
09	Ireland	16	12	14	10	15	14	
10	Serbia	19	19	16	16	12	18	
11	Italy	4	1	8	7	5	4	7
12	Australia	9	4	1	1	2	1	12
13	Georgia	10	8	11	5	9	11	
14	Israel	8	11	6	17	16	12	
15	France	5	3	2	6	8	3	8
16	Macedonia	12	16	7	12	3	10	1
17	Armenia	6	7	3	3	18	6	5
18	Wales	17	17	12	13	17	17	
19	Malta	7	5	4	4	1	2	10
20	Poland	2	6	5	8	11	7	4
