= Malta in the Junior Eurovision Song Contest 2018 =

- Junior Eurovision Song Contest 2018
- Country: Malta
- Selection process: Malta Junior Eurovision Song Contest 2018
- Selection date: 8 September 2018

Competing entry
- Song: "Marchin' On"
- Artist: Ela Mangion
- Songwriters: Emil Calleja Bayliss; Cyprian Cassar; Ela Mangion

Placement
- Final result: 5th, 181 points

Participation chronology

Malta was represented at the Junior Eurovision Song Contest 2018 on 25 November 2018 in Minsk, Belarus. The Maltese entrant for the 2018 contest was selected through a national final, organised by the Maltese broadcaster Public Broadcasting Services (PBS) on 8 September 2018. A total of 16 finalists performed original songs for the first time since 2010. Ela Mangion was chosen to represent the island nation with the song "Marchin' On".

== Background ==
Prior to the 2018 Contest, Malta had participated in the Junior Eurovision Song Contest thirteen times since its first entry in 2003 only opting not to participate at the 2011 and 2012 contests. Malta has won on two occasions: in 2013 when Gaia Cauchi won with the song "The Start", and again in 2015 when Destiny Chukunyere came first with "Not My Soul" when it won the contest with 185 points, breaking the previous record held by Spain for the most points ever given to a winner.

== Before Junior Eurovision ==
=== Malta Junior Eurovision Song Contest 2018 ===
==== Competing entries ====
| Artist | Song | Songwriter(s) |
|---|---|---|
| Aiden Aquilina Cohen | "Wherever You Go" | Muxu, Cyprian Cassar |
| Albert-Lauren Agius | "Paper Boats" | Emil Calleja Bayliss, Cyprian Cassar, Albert-Lauren Agius |
| Ela Mangion | "Marchin’ On" | Emil Calleja Bayliss, Cyprian Cassar, Ela Mangion |
| Eliana Gomez Blanco | "Music Takes Control" | Muxu, Cyprian Cassar |
| Giorgia Borg | "10" | Muxu, Gillian Camenzuli Kerr |
| Isaac Tom | "Bonfire Nights" | Emil Calleja Bayliss, Dario Bezzina, Isaac Tom |
| Jahel Cardona | "Home" | Muxu, Cyprian Cassar |
| Katryna Borg & Rihanna Azzopardi | "The Puppet and the Clown" | Christopher Azzopardi, Kaya, Katryna Borg, Rihana Azzopardi |
| Kristy Spiteri | "Nann" | Ritienne Frendo, Cyprian Cassar, Mark Scicluna |
| Kylie Meilak | "Crystals" | Muxu, Elton Zarb |
| Lora Grech | "Finish Line" | Muxu, Elton Zarb |
| Luana Schembri | "No Rest for the Wicked" | Emil Calleja Bayliss, Philip Vella, Luana Schembri |
| Riona Degiorgio | "Infinity" | Muxu, Dominic Cini |
| Thea Aquilina | "Back to My Freedom" | Bruce Robert Francis Smith, Ylva Persson, Linda Persson, Rickard Bondel Truumeel |
| Yarin Coleiro | "Can You Be the One" | Muxu, Cyprian Cassar |
| Zaira Mifsud | "Shout Now" | Muxu, Cyprian Cassar |

==== Final ====
The national final was held on 8 September 2018.

Final – 8 September 2018
| Draw | Artist | Song | Place |
|---|---|---|---|
| 1 | Giorgia Borg | "10" | 3 |
| 2 | Thea Aquilina | "Back to My Freedom" | — |
| 3 | Isaac Tom | "Bonfire Nights" | — |
| 4 | Yarin Coleiro | "Can You Be the One" | — |
| 5 | Kylie Meilak | "Crystals" | — |
| 6 | Lora Grech | "Finish Line" | — |
| 7 | Jahel Cardona | "Home" | — |
| 8 | Riona Degiorgio | "Infinity" | — |
| 9 | Ela Mangion | "Marchin’ On" | 1 |
| 10 | Eliana Gomez Blanco | "Music Takes Control" | — |
| 11 | Kristy Spiteri | "Nann" | — |
| 12 | Luana Schembri | "No Rest for the Wicked" | — |
| 13 | Albert-Lauren Agius | "Paper Boats" | — |
| 14 | Zaira Mifsud | "Shout Now" | — |
| 15 | Katryna Borg & Rihanna Azzopardi | "The Puppet and the Clown" | 2 |
| 16 | Aiden Aquilina Cohen | "Wherever You Go" | — |

== Artist and song information ==
Ela Mangion
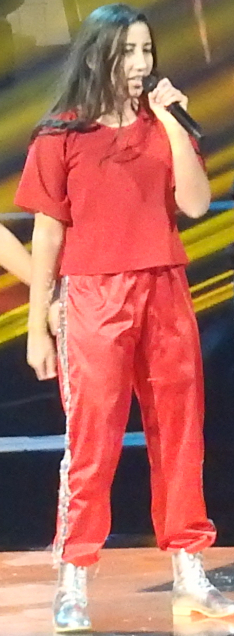

Background information
- Born: Ela Mangion; 6 January 2006 (age 20)
- Genres: Pop
- Occupation: Singer
- Instruments: Vocals, piano
- Years active: 2012–present

"Marchin' On"

Junior Eurovision Song Contest 2018 entry
- Country: Malta
- Artist: Ela Mangion
- Language: English
- Composers: Cyprian Cassar, Ela Mangion
- Lyricists: Emil Calleja Bayliss, Ela Mangion

Finals performance
- Final result: 5th
- Final points: 181

Entry chronology
- ◄ "Dawra Tond" (2017)

=== Ela Mangion ===
Ela Mangion (born 6 January 2006) is a Maltese child singer. She represented Malta at the Junior Eurovision Song Contest 2018 in Minsk, Belarus with the song "Marchin' On". This is not to be confused with the OneRepublic song with the same name.

=== Marchin' On ===
"Marchin' On" is a song by Maltese child singer Ela Mangion. It represented Malta at the Junior Eurovision Song Contest 2018 in Minsk, Belarus.

== At Junior Eurovision ==
During the opening ceremony and the running order draw which both took place on 19 November 2018, Malta was drawn to perform nineteenth on 25 November 2018, following Wales and preceding Poland.

=== Voting ===
The same voting system that was introduced in the 2017 edition was used, where the results were determined by 50% online voting and 50% jury voting. Every participating broadcaster assembled a national jury that consisted of three music industry professionals and two children aged between 10 and 15 who were citizens of the country they represented. The rankings of those jurors were combined to make an overall top ten.

The online voting consisted of two phases. The first phase of the online voting began on 23 November 2018 when a recap of all the rehearsal performances was shown on the contest's website Junioreurovision.tv before the viewers could vote. After this, voters also had the option to watch longer one-minute clips from each participant's rehearsal. This first round of voting ended on 25 November at 15:59 CET. The second phase of the online voting took place during the live show and began right after the last performance and was open for 15 minutes. International viewers were able to vote for a minimum of three and a maximum of five songs. They were also able to vote for their own country's song. These votes were then turned into points which were determined by the percentage of votes received. For example, if a song received 10% of the votes, it received 10% of the available points.

Points awarded to Malta
| Score | Country |
|---|---|
| 12 points | Australia; Georgia |
| 10 points | Belarus; Israel; Netherlands; Ukraine |
| 8 points | Ireland; Italy; Kazakhstan; Portugal; Russia; Wales |
| 7 points | |
| 6 points | |
| 5 points | Albania; Azerbaijan; Poland |
| 4 points | Macedonia; Serbia |
| 3 points | Armenia |
| 2 points | |
| 1 point | |
Malta received 43 points from the online vote

Points awarded by Malta
| Score | Country |
|---|---|
| 12 points | France |
| 10 points | Belarus |
| 8 points | Italy |
| 7 points | Armenia |
| 6 points | Kazakhstan |
| 5 points | Albania |
| 4 points | Ukraine |
| 3 points | Israel |
| 2 points | Russia |
| 1 point | Azerbaijan |

==== Detailed voting results ====
Detailed voting results from Malta
| Draw | Country | Juror A | Juror B | Juror C | Juror D | Juror E | Rank | Points |
|---|---|---|---|---|---|---|---|---|
| 01 | Ukraine | 12 | 3 | 7 | 8 | 7 | 7 | 4 |
| 02 | Portugal | 17 | 19 | 17 | 13 | 19 | 19 | |
| 03 | Kazakhstan | 6 | 8 | 3 | 11 | 6 | 5 | 6 |
| 04 | Albania | 9 | 10 | 4 | 14 | 3 | 6 | 5 |
| 05 | Russia | 4 | 7 | 6 | 19 | 8 | 9 | 2 |
| 06 | Netherlands | 15 | 13 | 11 | 9 | 10 | 13 | |
| 07 | Azerbaijan | 5 | 11 | 5 | 7 | 11 | 10 | 1 |
| 08 | Belarus | 3 | 4 | 2 | 5 | 12 | 2 | 10 |
| 09 | Ireland | 18 | 16 | 13 | 16 | 14 | 17 | |
| 10 | Serbia | 13 | 14 | 15 | 10 | 13 | 15 | |
| 11 | Italy | 1 | 6 | 9 | 15 | 2 | 3 | 8 |
| 12 | Australia | 10 | 5 | 18 | 6 | 15 | 11 | |
| 13 | Georgia | 7 | 12 | 8 | 18 | 16 | 14 | |
| 14 | Israel | 16 | 15 | 10 | 2 | 4 | 8 | 3 |
| 15 | France | 2 | 1 | 1 | 1 | 1 | 1 | 12 |
| 16 | Macedonia | 19 | 18 | 12 | 4 | 18 | 16 | |
| 17 | Armenia | 11 | 2 | 14 | 3 | 5 | 4 | 7 |
| 18 | Wales | 14 | 17 | 16 | 17 | 17 | 18 | |
| 19 | Malta | | | | | | | |
| 20 | Poland | 8 | 9 | 19 | 12 | 9 | 12 | |
