= Poland in the Junior Eurovision Song Contest 2018 =

- Junior Eurovision Song Contest 2018
- Participating broadcaster: Telewizja Polska (TVP)
- Country: Poland
- Selection process: Internal selection
- Announcement date: Artist: 21 September 2018; Song: 6 November 2018

Competing entry
- Song: "Anyone I Want to Be"
- Artist: Roksana Węgiel
- Songwriters: Maegan Cottone; Nathan Duvall; Cutfather; Peter Wallevik; Daniel Davidsen; Małgorzata Uściłowska; Patryk Kumór

Placement
- Final result: 1st, 215 points

Participation chronology

Poland was represented at the Junior Eurovision Song Contest 2018 with the song "Anyone I Want to Be", written by Maegan Cottone, Nathan Duvall, Cutfather, Peter Wallevik, Daniel Davidsen, Małgorzata Uściłowska, and Patryk Kumór, and performed by Roksana Węgiel. The Polish participating broadcaster, Telewizja Polska (TVP), internally selected its entry for the contest. The song won the contest with a total of 215 points.

== Background ==
Prior to the 2018 contest, Telewizja Polska (TVP) has participated in the Junior Eurovision Song Contest representing Poland four times. In 2003 and 2004, its entry ended in last place and it decided not to participate from 2005 to 2015. TVP returned successfully in 2016. Olivia Wieczorek was selected to represent the nation that year with the song "Nie zapomnij". Olivia ended in 11th place out of 17 entries with 60 points. In 2017, Alicja Rega was selected to represent Poland with the song "Mój dom". She ended up 8th of 16 entries with 138 points.

== Before Junior Eurovision ==
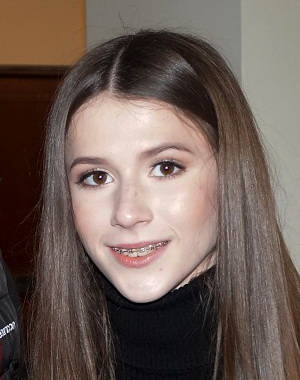
Roksana Węgiel was internally selected to represent Poland in the Junior Eurovision Song Contest 2018

TVP confirmed its intention to participate in the Junior Eurovision Song Contest 2018 in December 2017. According to the financial plans of the broadcaster, a national final was to be organised to select the Polish representatives, with many artists confirming their intention to participate in a national selection, such as Natalia Wawrzyńczyk, Arfik, Ula Kowalska, Julia Chmielarska, Ula Dorosz and Wiktoria Zwolińska. Among rumoured acts to participate in the national final were also Paula Biskup with the song "Wyliczanka", as well as thirteen-year-old artist Roksana Węgiel, the winner of the first edition of the Polish version of The Voice Kids. In September 2018, composer Agnieszka Wiechnik made an official request to TVP to organise a national final.

On 21 September 2018, the Polish broadcaster revealed that they had chosen Roksana Węgiel internally in order to represent Poland in the Junior Eurovision Song Contest 2018. TVP general director Jacek Kurski later confirmed choice of Roksana Węgiel was his "dictator-like" decision in consultation with the producer Konrad Smuga, based on the results of the televote and the entire selection process included in the first edition of The Voice Kids. Her entry, "Anyone I Want to Be", written by Maegan Cottone, Nathan Duvall, Cutfather, Peter Wallevik, Daniel Davidsen, Małgorzata Uściłowska and Patryk Kumór, was presented to the public on 6 November 2018, accompanied by an official music video.

== At Junior Eurovision ==
During the opening ceremony and the running order draw which both took place on 19 November 2018, Poland was drawn to perform twentieth (last) on 25 November 2018, following Malta.

=== Voting ===
The same voting system that was introduced in the 2017 edition was used, where the results were determined by 50% online voting and 50% jury voting. Every participating broadcaster assembled a national jury that consisted of three music industry professionals and two children aged between 10 and 15 who were citizens of the country they represented. The rankings of those jurors were combined to make an overall top ten.

The online voting consisted of two phases. The first phase of the online voting began on 23 November 2018 when a recap of all the rehearsal performances was shown on the contest's website Junioreurovision.tv before the viewers could vote. After this, voters also had the option to watch longer one-minute clips from each participant's rehearsal. This first round of voting ended on 25 November at 15:59 CET. The second phase of the online voting took place during the live show and began right after the last performance and was open for 15 minutes. International viewers were able to vote for a minimum of three and a maximum of five songs. They were also able to vote for their own country's song. These votes were then turned into points which were determined by the percentage of votes received. For example, if a song received 10% of the votes, it received 10% of the available points.

Points awarded to Poland
Score	Country
12 points	France
10 points	Australia; Serbia
8 points	Albania; Ukraine
7 points	
6 points	Israel; Wales
5 points	Georgia
4 points	Belarus; Russia
3 points	Macedonia
2 points	Italy
1 point	Kazakhstan
Poland received 136 points from the online vote

Points awarded by Poland
Score	Country
12 points	Ukraine
10 points	Australia
8 points	Ireland
7 points	Macedonia
6 points	Russia
5 points	Malta
4 points	Armenia
3 points	Italy
2 points	Israel
1 point	Georgia

==== Detailed voting results ====
The following members comprised the Polish jury:

- Damian Ukeje
- Majka Jeżowska
- Milena Grigorian
- Saszan
- Zuzanna Janik

Detailed voting results from Poland
Draw	Country	Juror A	Juror B	Juror C	Juror D	Juror E	Rank	Points
01	Ukraine	3	2	3	1	1	1	12
02	Portugal	14	12	19	19	16	17	
03	Kazakhstan	13	4	13	15	5	11	
04	Albania	8	18	16	14	17	16	
05	Russia	6	1	10	9	12	5	6
06	Netherlands	15	10	17	13	7	14	
07	Azerbaijan	12	13	9	17	18	15	
08	Belarus	16	17	8	5	14	13	
09	Ireland	2	8	2	6	9	3	8
10	Serbia	19	15	15	16	15	18	
11	Italy	7	11	5	10	6	8	3
12	Australia	1	7	1	2	4	2	10
13	Georgia	18	16	12	8	2	10	1
14	Israel	4	14	4	12	11	9	2
15	France	17	9	14	7	10	12	
16	Macedonia	5	6	7	4	8	4	7
17	Armenia	10	3	11	3	13	7	4
18	Wales	11	19	18	18	19	19	
19	Malta	9	5	6	11	3	6	5
20	Poland							
