= Albania in the Junior Eurovision Song Contest 2018 =

- Junior Eurovision Song Contest 2018
- Country: Albania
- Selection process: Junior Fest 2018
- Selection date: 23 September 2018

Competing entry
- Song: "Barbie"
- Artist: Efi Gjika
- Songwriters: Hristina Gjika; Efthimia Gjika

Placement
- Final result: 17th, 44 points

Participation chronology

Albania was represented at the Junior Eurovision Song Contest 2018 in Minsk, Belarus with the song "Barbie" performed by Efi Gjika. The Albanian broadcaster RTSH was responsible for the organization of their representative at the contest. Their entry was selected through Junior Fest 2018, a national selection process consisting of sixteen artists competed in order to become the Albanian representative on 23 September 2018.

== Background ==
Prior to the 2018 contest, Albania had participated in the Junior Eurovision Song Contest four times since its first entry in 2012, only opting not to participate at the 2013 and 2014 contests. Albania has never won the contest, with their best result being in 2015, with the song "Dambaje" performed by Mishela Rapo, achieving fifth place with a score of 93 points. In 2016, Klesta Qehaja represented Albania in Valletta, Malta with the song "Besoj". The country ended in 13th place out of 17 countries, achieving 38 points. In 2017, Ana Kodra represented Albania in Tbilisi, Georgia with the song "Don't Touch My Tree" and participated in the 2018 national final but did not win.

== Before Junior Eurovision ==
=== National final ===
The national final Junior Fest 2018 took place on 23 September 2018. It consisted of sixteen competing acts participating in a televised production at Amphitheater of the Lake Park in Tirana.

Draw	Artist	Song	Language
1	Hera Hysi	"Melodi pranverore"	Albanian
2	Emmi Rushiti	"Mbrëmje feste"	Albanian
3	Kristiana Veshaj	"Sot"	Albanian
4	Efi Gjika	"Barbie"	Albanian
5	Jasmina Hako	"Happy"	Albanian, English
6	Sindi Goga	"Me tinguj fantazi"	Albanian
7	Iris Sula & Samanta Qoshku	"Çdo gjë do dashuri"	Albanian
8	Era Rakipllari	"Panorama"	Albanian, English
9	Merlin Xhai	"Botë e re"	Albanian
10	Laura Boriçi	"Është koha"	Albanian
11	Iris Dollani	"Ylberi im"	Albanian
12	Sajana Kodheli	"Ylli im"	Albanian
13	Ana Kodra	"Prindër ju lutem"	Albanian
14	Melodajn Mancaku	"Ëndërroj"	Albanian
15	Speranza Bregasi	"Ditari"	Albanian
16	Uendi Goga	"Qiellin dhe yjet i dua"	Albanian

== At Junior Eurovision ==
During the opening ceremony and the running order draw which both took place on 19 November 2018, Albania was drawn to perform fourth on 25 November 2018, following Kazakhstan and preceding Russia.

=== Voting ===
The same voting system that was introduced in the 2017 edition was used, where the results were determined by 50% online voting and 50% jury voting. Every participating broadcaster assembled a national jury that consisted of three music industry professionals and two children aged between 10 and 15 who were citizens of the country they represented. The rankings of those jurors were combined to make an overall top ten.

The online voting consisted of two phases. The first phase of the online voting began on 23 November 2018 when a recap of all the rehearsal performances was shown on the contest's website Junioreurovision.tv before the viewers could vote. After this, voters also had the option to watch longer one-minute clips from each participant's rehearsal. This first round of voting ended on 25 November at 15:59 CET. The second phase of the online voting took place during the live show and began right after the last performance and was open for 15 minutes. International viewers were able vote for a minimum of three and a maximum of five songs. They were also able to vote for their own country's song. These votes were then turned into points which were determined by the percentage of votes received. For example, if a song received 10% of the votes, it received 10% of the available points.

Points awarded to Albania
Score	Country
12 points	
10 points	
8 points	
7 points	
6 points	
5 points	Malta
4 points	
3 points	
2 points	Wales
1 point	Azerbaijan; Ireland; Macedonia
Albania received 34 points from the online vote

Points awarded by Albania
Score	Country
12 points	France
10 points	Macedonia
8 points	Poland
7 points	Australia
6 points	Azerbaijan
5 points	Malta
4 points	Kazakhstan
3 points	Armenia
2 points	Ukraine
1 point	Israel

==== Detailed voting results ====
Detailed voting results from Albania
Draw	Country	Juror A	Juror B	Juror C	Juror D	Juror E	Rank	Points
01	Ukraine	6	13	7	5	17	9	2
02	Portugal	16	14	14	10	16	15	
03	Kazakhstan	8	8	8	4	6	7	4
04	Albania							
05	Russia	17	19	18	14	13	19	
06	Netherlands	15	9	15	15	12	14	
07	Azerbaijan	4	2	4	6	18	5	6
08	Belarus	7	18	10	13	15	12	
09	Ireland	19	17	19	12	9	17	
10	Serbia	10	15	11	16	19	16	
11	Italy	14	12	16	11	10	13	
12	Australia	5	7	5	7	1	4	7
13	Georgia	12	11	12	9	8	11	
14	Israel	13	5	13	19	7	10	1
15	France	1	1	1	1	2	1	12
16	Macedonia	3	4	3	2	5	2	10
17	Armenia	11	10	6	17	4	8	3
18	Wales	18	16	17	18	11	18	
19	Malta	9	6	9	8	3	6	5
20	Poland	2	3	2	3	14	3	8
