= Italy in the Junior Eurovision Song Contest 2018 =

- Junior Eurovision Song Contest 2018
- Country: Italy
- Selection process: Internal Selection
- Selection date: 9 October 2018

Competing entry
- Song: "What Is Love"
- Artist: Melissa and Marco
- Songwriters: Mario Gardini; Fabrizio Palaferri; Marco Boni; Melissa Di Pasca

Placement
- Final result: 7th, 151 points

Participation chronology

Italy was represented at the Junior Eurovision Song Contest 2018 which took place on 25 November 2018 in Minsk, Belarus. The Italian broadcaster Rai Gulp, which is a channel owned by Radiotelevisione Italiana (RAI), was responsible for organising their entry for the contest. Melissa and Marco were internally selected to represent Italy with the song "What Is Love", which finished seventh with 151 points at the event, receiving the top 12 points from the Macedonian jury and a cumulative 57 points through online voting.

== Background ==
Before the 2018 Contest, Italy had participated in the Junior Eurovision Song Contest three times since its debut in 2014, having won the contest on their first appearance with the song "Tu primo grande amore", performed by Vincenzo Cantiello.

== Before Junior Eurovision ==
The Italian broadcaster announced on 26 June 2018, that they would be participating at the contest which takes place on 25 November 2018, in Minsk, Belarus. The method for selecting their entrant and song was done internally by the national broadcaster, RAI. On 9 October 2018, it was announced that Melissa di Pasca (born 18 July 2008) and Marco Boni (born 17 August 2004) would be representing Italy at the contest with the song "What Is Love".

== At Junior Eurovision ==
During the opening ceremony and the running order draw which both took place on 19 November 2018, Italy was drawn to perform eleventh on 25 November 2018, following Serbia and preceding Australia.

=== Voting ===
The same voting system that was introduced in the 2017 edition was used, where the results were determined by 50% online voting and 50% jury voting. Every participating broadcaster assembled a national jury that consisted of three music industry professionals and two children aged between 10 and 15 who were citizens of the country they represented. The rankings of those jurors were combined to make an overall top ten.

The online voting consisted of two phases. The first phase of the online voting began on 23 November 2018 when a recap of all the rehearsal performances was shown on the contest's website Junioreurovision.tv before the viewers could vote. After this, voters also had the option to watch longer one-minute clips from each participant's rehearsal. This first round of voting ended on 25 November at 15:59 CET. The second phase of the online voting took place during the live show and began right after the last performance and was open for 15 minutes. International viewers were able vote for a minimum of three and a maximum of five songs. They were also able to vote for their own country's song. These votes were then turned into points which were determined by the percentage of votes received. For example, if a song received 10% of the votes, it received 10% of the available points.

Points awarded to Italy
Score	Country
12 points	Macedonia
10 points	Ireland; Kazakhstan
8 points	Malta
7 points	Australia; Belarus; Georgia; Israel
6 points	Serbia; Ukraine
5 points	
4 points	Azerbaijan; Portugal
3 points	France; Poland
2 points	
1 point	
Italy received 57 points from the online vote

Points awarded by Italy
Score	Country
12 points	Australia
10 points	Georgia
8 points	Malta
7 points	Ukraine
6 points	Israel
5 points	Belarus
4 points	Azerbaijan
3 points	Armenia
2 points	Poland
1 point	Macedonia

==== Detailed voting results ====
Detailed voting results from Italy
Draw	Country	Juror A	Juror B	Juror C	Juror D	Juror E	Rank	Points
01	Ukraine	6	6	2	3	12	4	7
02	Portugal	17	19	15	18	17	19	
03	Kazakhstan	8	8	10	9	8	11	
04	Albania	19	12	19	5	19	16	
05	Russia	13	14	16	13	7	13	
06	Netherlands	18	15	14	11	5	12	
07	Azerbaijan	16	7	13	1	11	7	4
08	Belarus	5	9	6	4	9	6	5
09	Ireland	12	18	18	16	15	18	
10	Serbia	14	16	17	15	4	15	
11	Italy							
12	Australia	2	1	3	7	1	1	12
13	Georgia	1	2	1	2	14	2	10
14	Israel	4	4	4	19	10	5	6
15	France	11	13	8	14	18	14	
16	Macedonia	10	10	12	10	3	10	1
17	Armenia	9	3	5	12	13	8	3
18	Wales	15	17	11	17	16	17	
19	Malta	3	5	7	8	2	3	8
20	Poland	7	11	9	6	6	9	2
