= Macedonia in the Junior Eurovision Song Contest 2018 =

- Junior Eurovision Song Contest 2018
- Country: Macedonia
- Selection process: Internal selection
- Announcement date: Artist: 18 August 2018; Song: 19 October 2018

Competing entry
- Song: "Doma"
- Artist: Marija Spasovska
- Songwriters: Darko Dimitrov; Elena Risteska

Placement
- Final result: 12th, 99 points

Participation chronology

Macedonia was represented at the Junior Eurovision Song Contest 2018 which took place on 25 November 2018 in Minsk, Belarus. Macedonian broadcaster MRT was responsible for organising their entry for the contest. Marija Spasovska was internally selected on 18 August 2018 as the Macedonian representative.

== Background ==
Prior to the 2018 contest, Macedonia had participated in the Junior Eurovision Song Contest twelve times, under the provisional reference of "Former Yugoslav Republic of Macedonia", since its debut at the inaugural contest in 2003. Macedonia were absent twice from the Junior Eurovision Song Contest in 2012 and 2014. They have never won the contest, with their best results being at the 2007 and 2008, represented by the duo Rosica Kulakova and Dimitar Stojmenovski, and Bobi Andonov respectively, achieving fifth place. In the 2017 contest, Mina Blažev represented her country in Tbilisi, Georgia with the song "Dancing Through Life". The song ended 12th out of 16 entries with 69 points.

== Before Junior Eurovision ==
On 24 August 2018, the Macedonian broadcaster revealed that they had chosen the thirteen-year-old artist Marija Spasovska internally to represent the Republic of North Macedonia in the Junior Eurovision Song Contest 2018. Her song for the contest was revealed on 19 October 2018.

== Artist and song information ==
Marija Spasovska
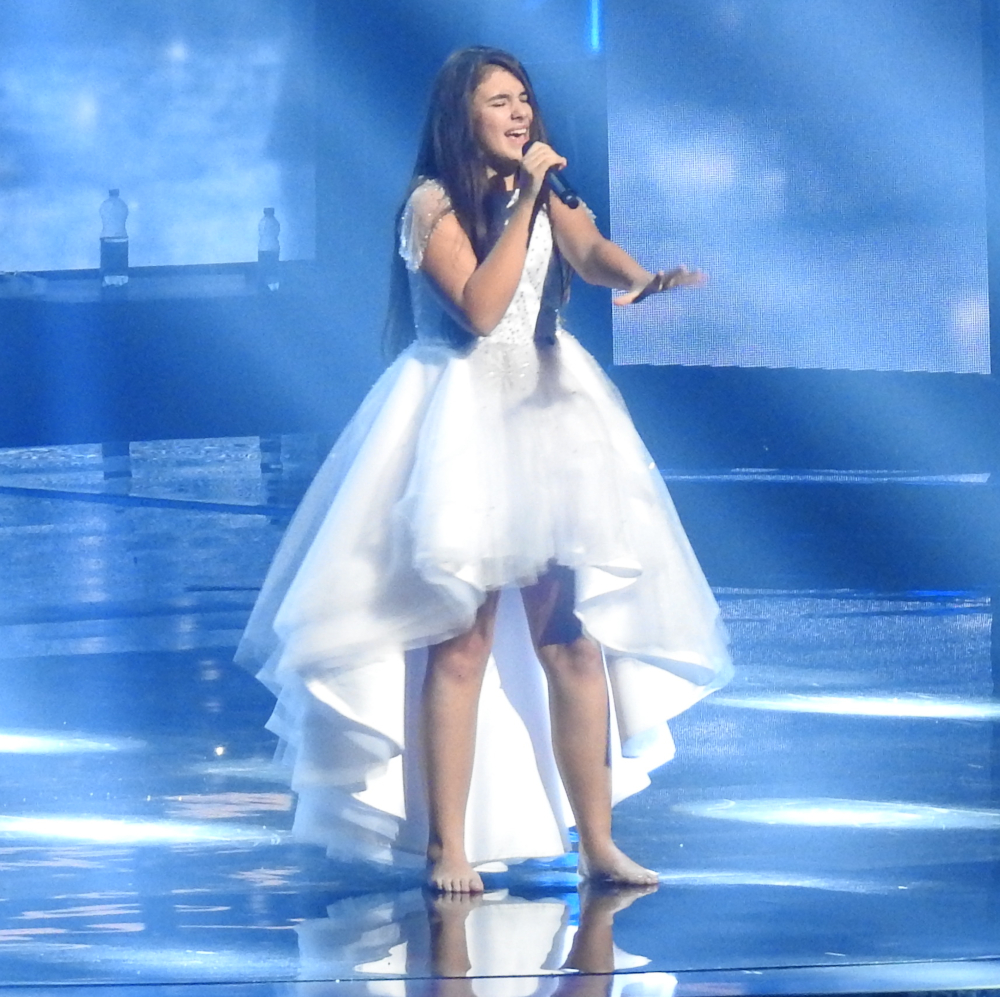

Background information
- Born: 10 May 2005 (age 20) Skopje, Macedonia
- Genres: Pop
- Occupation: Singer
- Instrument: Vocals

=== Marija Spasovska ===
Marija Spasovska (born 10 May 2005) is a Macedonian singer. She represented Macedonia at the Junior Eurovision Song Contest 2018 in Minsk, Belarus on 25 November 2018.

Marija Spasovska was born on 10 May 2005 in Skopje the Republic of Macedonia. She has been singing since she was 4. Numerous performances from various manifestations, competitions and promotions. From the experience so far, over twenty awards, praise and diplomas from different music festivals and competitions at the domestic and international level are listed. She has a role in the first Macedonian musical "My Secret" dedicated to Toše Proeski. Her first teenage song "Igraj so srce" (Играј со срце; lit. Play the heart) was released on 30 May 2018.

== At Junior Eurovision ==
During the opening ceremony and the running order draw which both took place on 19 November 2018, Macedonia was drawn to perform sixteenth on 25 November 2018, following France and preceding Armenia.

=== Voting ===
The same voting system that was introduced in the 2017 edition was used, where the results were determined by 50% online voting and 50% jury voting. Every participating broadcaster assembled a national jury that consisted of three music industry professionals and two children aged between 10 and 15 who were citizens of the country they represented. The rankings of those jurors were combined to make an overall top ten.

The online voting consisted of two phases. The first phase of the online voting began on 23 November 2018 when a recap of all the rehearsal performances was shown on the contest's website Junioreurovision.tv before the viewers could vote. After this, voters also had the option to watch longer one-minute clips from each participant's rehearsal. This first round of voting ended on 25 November at 15:59 CET. The second phase of the online voting took place during the live show and began right after the last performance and was open for 15 minutes. International viewers were able to vote for a minimum of three and a maximum of five songs. They were also able to vote for their own country's song. These votes were then turned into points which were determined by the percentage of votes received. For example, if a song received 10% of the votes, it received 10% of the available points.

Points awarded to Macedonia
| Score | Country |
|---|---|
| 12 points | Kazakhstan; Serbia |
| 10 points | Albania |
| 8 points | |
| 7 points | France; Poland |
| 6 points | |
| 5 points | Armenia |
| 4 points | Wales |
| 3 points | |
| 2 points | Australia; Ukraine |
| 1 point | Belarus; Italy; Russia |
Macedonia received 35 points from the online vote

Points awarded by Macedonia
| Score | Country |
|---|---|
| 12 points | Italy |
| 10 points | Ukraine |
| 8 points | Kazakhstan |
| 7 points | Australia |
| 6 points | France |
| 5 points | Georgia |
| 4 points | Malta |
| 3 points | Poland |
| 2 points | Serbia |
| 1 point | Albania |

==== Detailed voting results ====
The following members comprised the Macedonian jury:

- Ana Kostaninovska
- Ivo Matevski
- Kjara Blažev
- Mina Blažev – represented Macedonia in the Junior Eurovision Song Contest 2017
- Nataša Milat Krstevska

Detailed voting results from Macedonia
| Draw | Country | Juror A | Juror B | Juror C | Juror D | Juror E | Rank | Points |
|---|---|---|---|---|---|---|---|---|
| 01 | Ukraine | 5 | 9 | 4 | 2 | 1 | 2 | 10 |
| 02 | Portugal | 16 | 17 | 16 | 18 | 16 | 18 | |
| 03 | Kazakhstan | 1 | 13 | 3 | 5 | 4 | 3 | 8 |
| 04 | Albania | 9 | 4 | 14 | 14 | 5 | 10 | 1 |
| 05 | Russia | 11 | 6 | 13 | 15 | 9 | 12 | |
| 06 | Netherlands | 17 | 18 | 19 | 17 | 18 | 19 | |
| 07 | Azerbaijan | 18 | 8 | 12 | 12 | 11 | 13 | |
| 08 | Belarus | 10 | 14 | 15 | 6 | 3 | 11 | |
| 09 | Ireland | 14 | 19 | 18 | 11 | 14 | 17 | |
| 10 | Serbia | 19 | 3 | 8 | 8 | 10 | 9 | 2 |
| 11 | Italy | 2 | 1 | 1 | 7 | 15 | 1 | 12 |
| 12 | Australia | 3 | 5 | 7 | 1 | 13 | 4 | 7 |
| 13 | Georgia | 4 | 2 | 5 | 9 | 17 | 6 | 5 |
| 14 | Israel | 13 | 16 | 10 | 13 | 12 | 14 | |
| 15 | France | 6 | 10 | 2 | 10 | 2 | 5 | 6 |
| 16 | Macedonia | | | | | | | |
| 17 | Armenia | 12 | 12 | 17 | 19 | 8 | 15 | |
| 18 | Wales | 15 | 11 | 11 | 16 | 19 | 16 | |
| 19 | Malta | 7 | 7 | 9 | 3 | 6 | 7 | 4 |
| 20 | Poland | 8 | 15 | 6 | 4 | 7 | 8 | 3 |
