= Australia in the Junior Eurovision Song Contest 2018 =

- Junior Eurovision Song Contest 2018
- Participating broadcaster: Australian Broadcasting Corporation (ABC)
- Country: Australia
- Selection process: Internal selection
- Announcement date: Artist: 1 September 2018; Song: 8 October 2018

Competing entry
- Song: "Champion"
- Artist: Jael
- Songwriters: MSquared (Team)

Placement
- Final result: 3rd, 201 points

Participation chronology

Australia was represented at the Junior Eurovision Song Contest 2018 in Minsk, Belarus. The Australian broadcaster ABC was responsible for choosing their entry for the contest. Jael was internally selected to represent Australia in Belarus.

== Background ==
Prior to the 2018 Contest, Australia had participated in the Junior Eurovision Song Contest three times since its debut in 2015, with the song "My Girls" performed by Bella Paige. In 2016, Alexa Curtis represented Australia with the song "We Are", achieving fifth place. In 2017, Isabella Clarke represented Australia with her song "Speak Up", achieving third place.

== Before Junior Eurovision ==
On 1 September 2018, it was announced that Jael had been internally chosen by the broadcaster to represent Australia.

== Artist and song information ==
Jael Wena
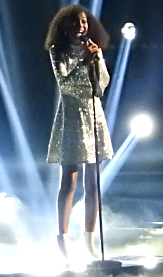

Background information
- Born: 22 December 2005 (age 20); Melbourne, Australia
- Occupation: Singer
- Years active: 2010–present

=== Jael ===
Jael Wena (born 22 December 2005) is an Australian singer of Congolese descent who represented Australia at the Junior Eurovision Song Contest 2018 with the song "Champion", finishing third.

In 2019, she competed in the season 9 of Australia's Got Talent, and in 2022, she took part in season 11 of Australian edition of The Voice.

=== Champion ===
"Champion" is a song by Australian singer Jael. It represented Australia at the Junior Eurovision Song Contest 2018.

== At Junior Eurovision ==
During the opening ceremony and the running order draw which both took place on 19 November 2018, Australia was drawn to perform twelfth on 25 November 2018, following Italy and preceding Georgia.

=== Voting ===
The same voting system that was introduced in the 2017 edition was used, where the results were determined by 50% online voting and 50% jury voting. Every participating broadcaster assembled a national jury that consisted of three music industry professionals and two children aged between 10 and 15 who were citizens of the country they represented. The rankings of those jurors were combined to make an overall top ten.

The online voting consisted of two phases. The first phase of the online voting began on 23 November 2018 when a recap of all the rehearsal performances was shown on the contest's website Junioreurovision.tv before the viewers could vote. After this, voters also had the option to watch longer one-minute clips from each participant's rehearsal. This first round of voting ended on 25 November at 15:59 CET. The second phase of the online voting took place during the live show and began right after the last performance and was open for 15 minutes. International viewers were able to vote for a minimum of three and a maximum of five songs. They were also able to vote for their own country's song. These votes were then turned into points which were determined by the percentage of votes received. For example, if a song received 10% of the votes, it received 10% of the available points.

Points awarded to Australia
Score	Country
12 points	Belarus; Italy; Netherlands; Portugal; Ukraine; Wales
10 points	Poland; Russia
8 points	Georgia
7 points	Albania; Armenia; Ireland; Macedonia
6 points	Azerbaijan; France
5 points	
4 points	
3 points	Kazakhstan; Serbia
2 points	Israel
1 point	
Australia received 53 points from the online vote

Points awarded by Australia
Score	Country
12 points	Malta
10 points	Poland
8 points	Russia
7 points	Italy
6 points	Armenia
5 points	Georgia
4 points	France
3 points	Netherlands
2 points	Macedonia
1 point	Belarus

==== Detailed voting results ====
Detailed voting results from Australia
Draw	Country	Juror A	Juror B	Juror C	Juror D	Juror E	Rank	Points
01	Ukraine	18	18	7	15	17	18	
02	Portugal	11	17	19	18	13	19	
03	Kazakhstan	14	14	15	14	3	14	
04	Albania	6	16	11	17	9	13	
05	Russia	5	11	5	7	2	3	8
06	Netherlands	8	15	18	3	7	8	3
07	Azerbaijan	12	10	8	12	14	11	
08	Belarus	9	19	14	11	4	10	1
09	Ireland	16	13	10	16	16	17	
10	Serbia	17	12	17	8	12	16	
11	Italy	15	1	9	2	18	4	7
12	Australia							
13	Georgia	3	7	13	4	6	6	5
14	Israel	19	9	3	19	15	15	
15	France	4	3	12	9	8	7	4
16	Macedonia	13	8	6	5	11	9	2
17	Armenia	10	2	4	13	5	5	6
18	Wales	7	6	16	10	19	12	
19	Malta	1	4	1	1	1	1	12
20	Poland	2	5	2	6	10	2	10
