= Ukraine in the Junior Eurovision Song Contest 2018 =

- Junior Eurovision Song Contest 2018
- Country: Ukraine
- Selection process: Internal selection
- Announcement date: 10 September 2018

Competing entry
- Song: "Say Love"
- Artist: Darina Krasnovetska
- Songwriters: Mykhailo Klymenko; Volodymyr Sharykov; Darina Krasnovetska

Placement
- Final result: 4th, 182 points

Participation chronology

Ukraine was represented at the Junior Eurovision Song Contest 2018 in Minsk, Belarus with the song "Say Love" performed by Darina Krasnovetska. Their entrant was selected through an internal selection, organised by the Ukrainian broadcaster UA:PBC.

== Background ==
Prior to the 2018 Contest, Ukraine had participated in the Junior Eurovision Song Contest twelve times since its debut in 2006. Ukraine have never missed a contest since their debut appearance, having won the contest once in 2012 with the song "Nebo", performed by Anastasiya Petryk. The Ukrainian capital Kyiv has hosted the contest twice, at the Palace of Sports in 2009, and the Palace "Ukraine" in 2013.

Ukraine initially withdrew from the contest on 2 July 2018 due to financial difficulties, but were ultimately added to the list of participating countries on 2 August 2018, setting a record of 20 participating countries.

== Before Junior Eurovision ==
=== Internal selection ===
An online public vote took place from 28 August 2018 to 3 September 2018 for users to vote for their favourite entries via UA:PBC's official website junioreurovision.ua. The Ukrainian representative was ultimately selected through the votes of jury members made up of music professionals, taking the results of the online voting into consideration. "Say Love" performed by Darina Krasnovetska was announced as the winner of the national final on 10 September 2018. The jury panel that selected the winner consisted of: Maria Burmaka (singer, jury chairperson), Taras Topolia (lead singer of Antytila), Oleksandra Koltsova (singer and member of the Managing Board at UA:PBC), Sofia Kutsenko (singer, represented Ukraine in the Junior Eurovision Song Contest 2014 as part of Sympho-Nick) and Laud (singer and composer, Vidbir 2018 finalist).

Artist	Song	Online vote rank	Result
Darina Krasnovetska	"Say Love"	3	Selected
Denys Rodin	"Bat'ky" (Батьки)	9	Not selected
Haos	"Nenormal'ne lito" (Ненормальне літо)	8	Not selected
Iryna Ihnatenko	"Ya z toboyu" (Я з тобою)	6	Not selected
Kain Rivers	"Without Saying Goodbye"	1	Not selected
Oleksandr Balabanov	"My dity zemli!" (Ми діти землі!)	2	Not selected
Polina Pisartsova	"Ty povir v lyubov" (Ти повір в любов)	5	Not selected
Sophia Ivanko	"Chomu?" (Чому?)	7	Not selected
The Sparks	"We Are Part of This"	10	Not selected
Yaryna Taras	"Sonyachniy bit" (Сонячний біт)	4	Not selected

== Artist and song information ==
Darina Krasnovetska
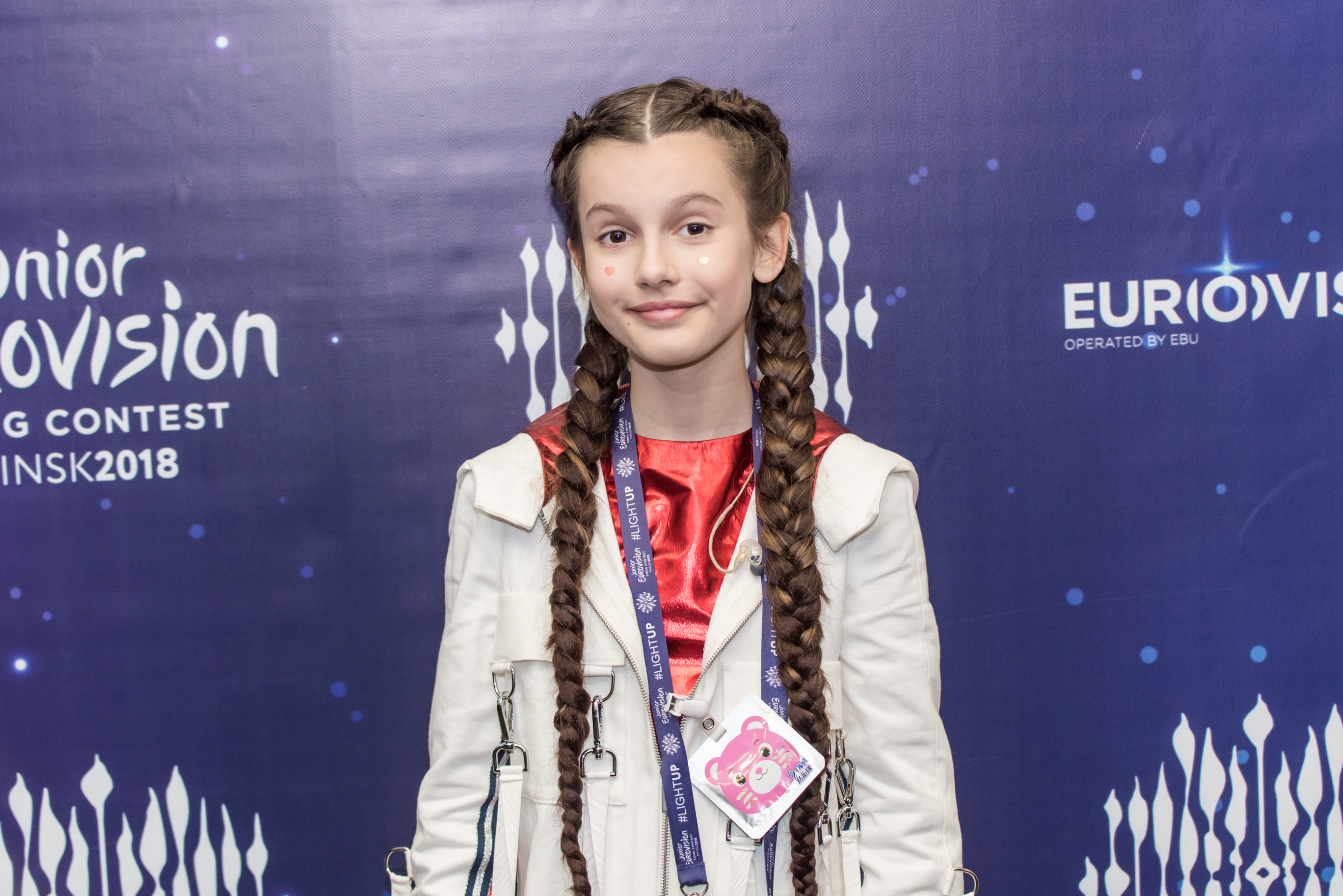

Background information
- Born: 7 May 2007 (age 18)
- Origin: Vinnytsia, Ukraine
- Genres: Pop
- Occupation: Singer
- Instrument: Vocals

(Ukraine) "Say Love"
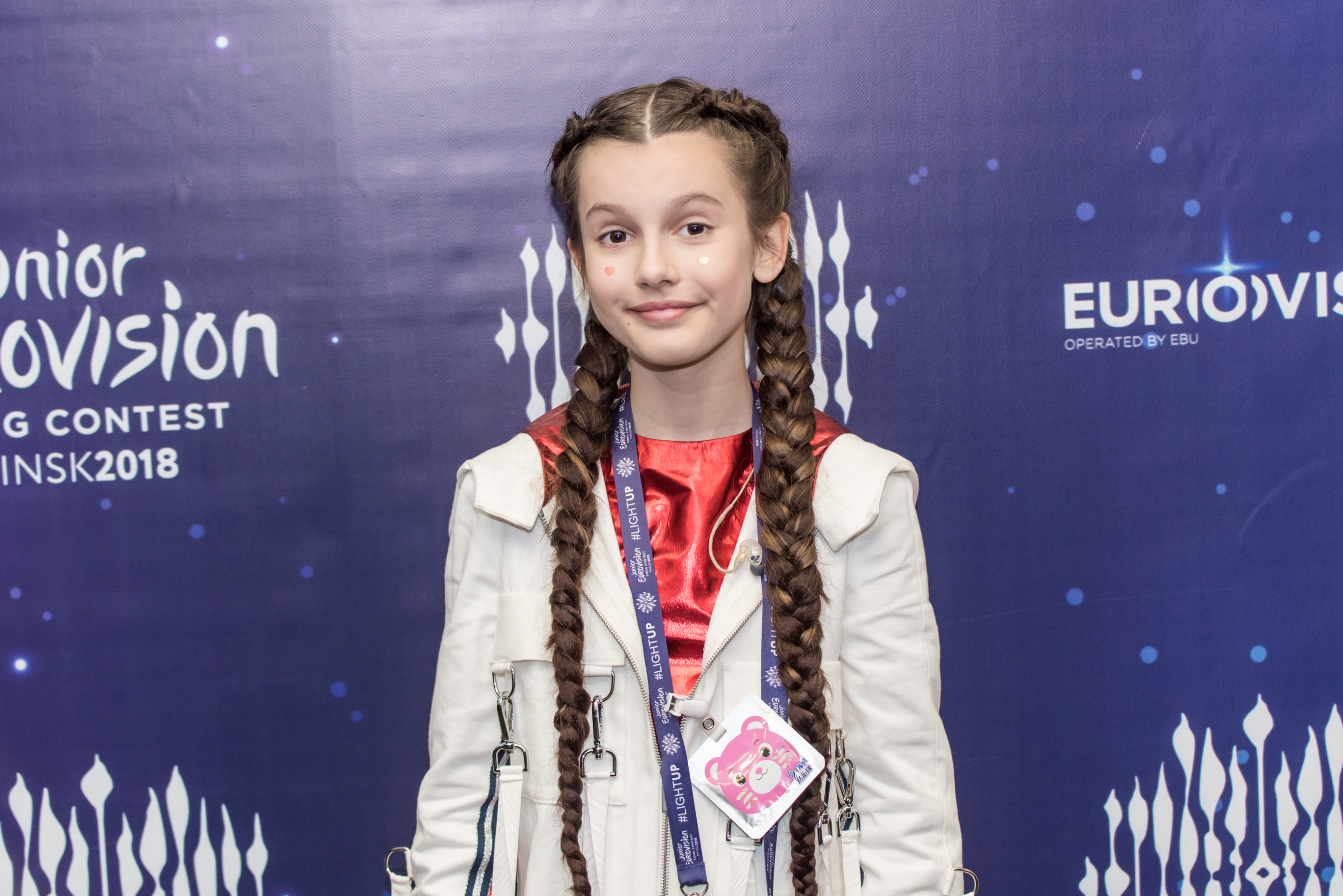

Junior Eurovision Song Contest 2018 entry
- Country: Ukraine
- Artist: Darina Krasnovetska
- Languages: Ukrainian; English
- Composers: Mykhaylo Klymenko, Darina Krasnovetska
- Lyricists: Mykhaylo Klymenko, Volodymyr Sharykov, Darina Krasnovetska

Finals performance
- Final result: 4th
- Final points: 182 points

Entry chronology
- ◄ "Don't Stop" (2017)
- "The Spirit of Music" (2019) ►

=== Darina Krasnovetska ===
Darina Krasnovetska (born 7 May 2007) is a Ukrainian child singer. She represented Ukraine at the Junior Eurovision Song Contest 2018 with the song "Say Love", finishing fourth.

=== Say Love ===
"Say Love" is a song by Ukrainian child singer Darina Krasnovetska. It represented Ukraine at the Junior Eurovision Song Contest 2018.

== At Junior Eurovision ==
During the opening ceremony and the running order draw which both took place on 19 November 2018, Ukraine was drawn to perform first on 25 November 2018, preceding Portugal.

=== Voting ===
The same voting system that was introduced in the 2017 edition was used, where the results were determined by 50% online voting and 50% jury voting. Every participating broadcaster assembled a national jury that consisted of three music industry professionals and two children aged between 10 and 15 who were citizens of the country they represented. The rankings of those jurors were combined to make an overall top ten.

The online voting consisted of two phases. The first phase of the online voting began on 23 November 2018 when a recap of all the rehearsal performances was shown on the contest's website Junioreurovision.tv before the viewers could vote. After this, voters also had the option to watch longer one-minute clips from each participant's rehearsal. This first round of voting ended on 25 November at 15:59 CET. The second phase of the online voting took place during the live show and began right after the last performance and was open for 15 minutes. International viewers were able to vote for a minimum of three and a maximum of five songs. They were also able to vote for their own country's song. These votes were then turned into points which were determined by the percentage of votes received. For example, if a song received 10% of the votes, it received 10% of the available points.

Points awarded to Ukraine
Score	Country
12 points	Poland
10 points	Georgia; Macedonia
8 points	Israel; Serbia
7 points	Italy; Portugal
6 points	Kazakhstan
5 points	France; Ireland; Wales
4 points	Malta; Netherlands
3 points	Azerbaijan; Belarus; Russia
2 points	Albania; Armenia
1 point	
Ukraine received 78 points from the online vote

Points awarded by Ukraine
Score	Country
12 points	Australia
10 points	Malta
8 points	Poland
7 points	Georgia
6 points	Italy
5 points	Kazakhstan
4 points	Israel
3 points	Armenia
2 points	Macedonia
1 point	Netherlands

==== Detailed voting results ====
Detailed voting results from Ukraine
Draw	Country	Juror A	Juror B	Juror C	Juror D	Juror E	Rank	Points
01	Ukraine							
02	Portugal	18	16	18	13	15	18	
03	Kazakhstan	6	14	6	3	4	6	5
04	Albania	17	11	14	18	16	16	
05	Russia	19	19	13	17	8	15	
06	Netherlands	8	9	8	4	10	10	1
07	Azerbaijan	15	15	11	1	12	12	
08	Belarus	12	3	12	16	11	13	
09	Ireland	14	12	15	15	14	14	
10	Serbia	16	18	19	9	17	17	
11	Italy	1	7	7	5	13	5	6
12	Australia	2	8	2	12	2	1	12
13	Georgia	5	6	3	14	3	4	7
14	Israel	4	2	10	11	7	7	4
15	France	9	5	17	8	9	11	
16	Macedonia	10	13	9	2	6	9	2
17	Armenia	11	4	1	10	18	8	3
18	Wales	13	17	16	19	19	19	
19	Malta	3	10	4	6	1	2	10
20	Poland	7	1	5	7	5	3	8
