= Serbia in the Junior Eurovision Song Contest 2018 =

- Junior Eurovision Song Contest 2018
- Country: Serbia
- Selection process: Internal selection
- Announcement date: 13 September 2018

Competing entry
- Song: "Svet"
- Artist: Bojana Radovanović
- Songwriters: Marija Marić Marković; Bojana Radovanović

Placement
- Final result: 19th, 30 points

Participation chronology

Serbia was represented at the Junior Eurovision Song Contest 2018 in Minsk, Belarus with the song "Svet" performed by Bojana Radovanović. Radio Television of Serbia (RTS) was responsible for selecting their entry for the contest.

== Background ==
Prior to the 2018 Contest, Serbia had participated in the Junior Eurovision Song Contest eight times since its debut in 2006, and once as Serbia and Montenegro in 2005, prior to the Montenegrin independence referendum in 2006 which culminated into the dissolution of Serbia and Montenegro, As of 2018, Serbia's best results are two third places, achieved in 2007 and 2010. In last year's contest Serbia got a tenth place with Jana Paunović and Irina Brodić and a song called "Ceo svet je naš".

== Before Junior Eurovision ==
On 13 September 2018, it was announced that Bojana Radovanović would represent the country in Minsk, Belarus with the song "Svet".

== At Junior Eurovision ==
During the opening ceremony and the running order draw which both took place on 19 November 2018, Serbia was drawn to perform tenth on 25 November 2018, following Ireland and preceding Italy.

=== Voting ===
The same voting system that was introduced in the 2017 edition was used, where the results were determined by 50% online voting and 50% jury voting. Every participating broadcaster assembled a national jury that consisted of three music industry professionals and two children aged between 10 and 15 who were citizens of the country they represented. The rankings of those jurors were combined to make an overall top ten.

The online voting consisted of two phases. The first phase of the online voting began on 23 November 2018 when a recap of all the rehearsal performances was shown on the contest's website Junioreurovision.tv before the viewers could vote. After this, voters also had the option to watch longer one-minute clips from each participant's rehearsal. This first round of voting ended on 25 November at 15:59 CET. The second phase of the online voting took place during the live show and began right after the last performance and was open for 15 minutes. International viewers were able to vote for a minimum of three and a maximum of five songs. They were also able to vote for their own country's song. These votes were then turned into points which were determined by the percentage of votes received. For example, if a song received 10% of the votes, it received 10% of the available points.

Points awarded to Serbia
Score	Country
12 points	
10 points	
8 points	
7 points	
6 points	
5 points	
4 points	
3 points	
2 points	Macedonia
1 point	
Serbia received 28 points from the online vote

Points awarded by Serbia
Score	Country
12 points	Macedonia
10 points	Poland
8 points	Ukraine
7 points	France
6 points	Italy
5 points	Kazakhstan
4 points	Malta
3 points	Australia
2 points	Georgia
1 point	Netherlands

==== Detailed voting results ====
The following members comprised the Serbian jury:

- Jana Paunović – represented Serbia in the Junior Eurovision Song Contest 2017 alongside Irina Brodić
- Lejla Hot
- Leontina Vukomanović
- Mihailo Ronić
- Vojkan Borisavljević

Detailed voting results from Serbia
Draw	Country	Juror A	Juror B	Juror C	Juror D	Juror E	Rank	Points
01	Ukraine	17	1	2	2	9	3	8
02	Portugal	18	18	16	16	10	16	
03	Kazakhstan	10	4	5	5	11	6	5
04	Albania	16	16	19	19	15	19	
05	Russia	5	15	15	13	13	13	
06	Netherlands	11	13	12	14	4	10	1
07	Azerbaijan	9	17	18	17	18	17	
08	Belarus	19	12	14	15	19	18	
09	Ireland	14	11	13	12	12	14	
10	Serbia							
11	Italy	4	7	6	6	1	5	6
12	Australia	3	9	9	10	7	8	3
13	Georgia	8	8	7	7	8	9	2
14	Israel	13	14	8	8	17	12	
15	France	12	3	3	4	3	4	7
16	Macedonia	7	5	1	1	2	1	12
17	Armenia	15	6	11	11	16	11	
18	Wales	6	19	17	18	14	15	
19	Malta	2	10	10	9	6	7	4
20	Poland	1	2	4	3	5	2	10
