= Portugal in the Junior Eurovision Song Contest 2018 =

- Junior Eurovision Song Contest 2018
- Participating broadcaster: Rádio e Televisão de Portugal (RTP)
- Country: Portugal
- Selection process: Artist: Juniores de Portugal 2018; Song: Internal Selection
- Selection date: Artist: 28 September 2018; Song: 17 October 2018

Competing entry
- Song: "Gosto de tudo (já não gosto de nada)"
- Artist: Rita Laranjeira
- Songwriter: João Só

Placement
- Final result: 18th, 42 points

Participation chronology

Portugal was represented at the Junior Eurovision Song Contest 2018 with the song "Gosto de tudo (já não gosto de nada)", written by João Só, and performed by Rita Laranjeira. The Portuguese participating broadcaster, Rádio e Televisão de Portugal (RTP), organised a national selection in order to select its performer for the contest, and it internally selected the song afterwards.

== Background ==
The participation of Rádio e Televisão de Portugal (RTP) in the Junior Eurovision Song Contest representing Portugal began at the 2006 contest. RTP used a national selection format to select its performers, organising a show entitled "Festival da Canção Junior". This was a junior version of Festival da Canção, the national music competition organised by RTP to choose its entry for the Eurovision Song Contest. The first Portuguese representative was Pedro Madeira with the song "Deixa-me sentir", which finished in second-last place out of fifteen participating entries, achieving a score of twenty-two points. RTP withdrew from competing in 2008, and returned in 2017.

== Before Junior Eurovision ==
=== Júniores de Portugal 2018 ===
The singer who performed the Portuguese entry for the Junior Eurovision Song Contest 2018 was again selected through the singing competition Júniores de Portugal ("Juniors of Portugal"). Between 1 September and 15 September 2018, children between the ages of 9 and 14 could submit a video of themselves singing online to try to participate in Junior Eurovision that year. RTP received over 70 submissions and selected 10 finalists. They took part in live auditions and the winner of the event was decided by a jury. The panel consisted of Nuno Galopim (Portuguese commentator for Eurovision and Junior Eurovision), Pedro Madeira (who represented Portugal in 2006), Carla Bugalho (Head Of Delegation for Portugal in Eurovision and Junior Eurovision), Fernando Martins and Sílvia Alberto (Eurovision 2018 host). Although the auditions were not published, it is known that Rita Laranjeira performed 3 songs: "Eu sei", "Somewhere Over The Rainbow" and "I Surrender”.

Finalists of Juniores de Portugal 2018
- Carolina Teixeira
- Eva Stuart
- Júlia Ochoa
- Lara Matos Ferreira
- Malia Afonso
- Mariana Chaves
- Matilde Cepeda
- Nuno Siqueira
- Rita Laranjeira
- Sara Monteiro

=== Song selection ===
After Rita Laranjeira's selection, it was announced Portuguese broadcaster RTP had invited a composer to come forward with one or several songs that capture the essence of ”diversity, empathy and modernity”. On 12 October, the song title was announced to be "Gosto de tudo (já não gosto de nada)". The song itself was released on 17 October 2018. The song is about “the way teenagers relate today with the world through social media.” The song was written and composed by João Só who was selected by RTP to write the Portuguese entry. João Só has previously competed as a songwriter in the Portuguese Eurovision selection Festival da Canção in both 2012 and 2016.

== Artist information ==
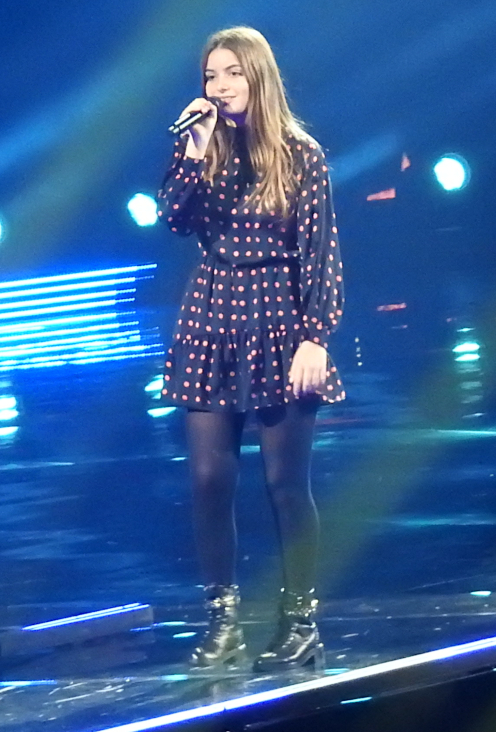
Rita Laranjeira

=== Rita Laranjeira ===
Rita Laranjeira (born 3 March 2005) is a Portuguese child singer from Sintra, Portugal. She attends the Sintra Music Conservatoire in the disciplines violin, orchestra, musical training and choir. In 2018, she participated in the MEO Kids Music Fest and Junior Eurovision Song Contest, and in 2020 in The Voice Portugal.

== At Junior Eurovision ==
During the opening ceremony and the running order draw which both took place on 19 November 2018, Portugal was drawn to perform second on 25 November 2018, following Ukraine and preceding Kazakhstan.

=== Voting ===
The same voting system that was introduced in the 2017 edition was used, where the results were determined by 50% online voting and 50% jury voting. Every participating broadcaster assembled a national jury that consisted of three music industry professionals and two children aged between 10 and 15 who were citizens of the country they represented. The rankings of those jurors were combined to make an overall top ten.

The online voting consisted of two phases. The first phase of the online voting began on 23 November 2018 when a recap of all the rehearsal performances was shown on the contest's website Junioreurovision.tv before the viewers could vote. After this, voters also had the option to watch longer one-minute clips from each participant's rehearsal. This first round of voting ended on 25 November at 15:59 CET. The second phase of the online voting took place during the live show and began right after the last performance and was open for 15 minutes. International viewers were able to vote for a minimum of three and a maximum of five songs. They were also able to vote for their own country's song. These votes were then turned into points which were determined by the percentage of votes received. For example, if a song received 10% of the votes, it received 10% of the available points.

In the contest, Portugal received no points from the professional juries; they received 42 points from the online vote.

Points awarded by Portugal
Score	Country
12 points	Australia
10 points	Belarus
8 points	Malta
7 points	Ukraine
6 points	Armenia
5 points	France
4 points	Italy
3 points	Israel
2 points	Georgia
1 point	Russia

==== Detailed voting results ====
Detailed voting results from Portugal
Draw	Country	Juror A	Juror B	Juror C	Juror D	Juror E	Rank	Points
01	Ukraine	14	2	4	13	2	4	7
02	Portugal							
03	Kazakhstan	7	18	7	6	13	11	
04	Albania	16	16	19	10	8	16	
05	Russia	6	12	10	5	9	10	1
06	Netherlands	12	15	12	16	10	15	
07	Azerbaijan	10	17	11	17	18	17	
08	Belarus	3	3	6	7	3	2	10
09	Ireland	13	11	9	14	7	12	
10	Serbia	19	14	16	15	14	18	
11	Italy	5	5	8	4	11	7	4
12	Australia	4	6	2	2	4	1	12
13	Georgia	9	7	15	3	12	9	2
14	Israel	18	1	17	19	6	8	3
15	France	17	4	1	9	5	6	5
16	Macedonia	1	13	14	12	17	13	
17	Armenia	8	10	3	8	1	5	6
18	Wales	15	19	18	18	19	19	
19	Malta	2	9	5	1	15	3	8
20	Poland	11	8	13	11	16	14	
