= Azerbaijan in the Junior Eurovision Song Contest 2018 =

- Junior Eurovision Song Contest 2018
- Country: Azerbaijan
- Selection process: Internal selection
- Announcement date: Artist: 18 September 2018; Song: 16 October 2018

Competing entry
- Song: "I Wanna Be Like You"
- Artist: Fidan Huseynova
- Songwriters: Ayten Ismikhanova; Elvira Michieva; Isa Melikov

Placement
- Final result: 16th, 47 points

Participation chronology

Azerbaijan was represented at the Junior Eurovision Song Contest 2018 in Minsk, Belarus. The Azerbaijani entry was selected through an internal selection. On 18 September 2018 it was revealed that Fidan Huseynova would represent Azerbaijan in the contest.

== Background ==
Azerbaijan debuted in the Junior Eurovision Song Contest in 2012. In 2008, İTV announced that Azerbaijan would take part in the Junior Eurovision Song Contest 2008 in Limassol, but then withdrew before the contest, because there were too few candidates for the national selection and consequently canceled its debut.

After taking part in the Junior Eurovision Song Contest 2013, Azerbaijan withdrew from the contest because of unspecified reasons and on 25 July 2018, it was announced that Azerbaijan will return to the contest in 2018.

== Artist and song information ==
=== Fidan Huseynova ===
Fidan Huseynova
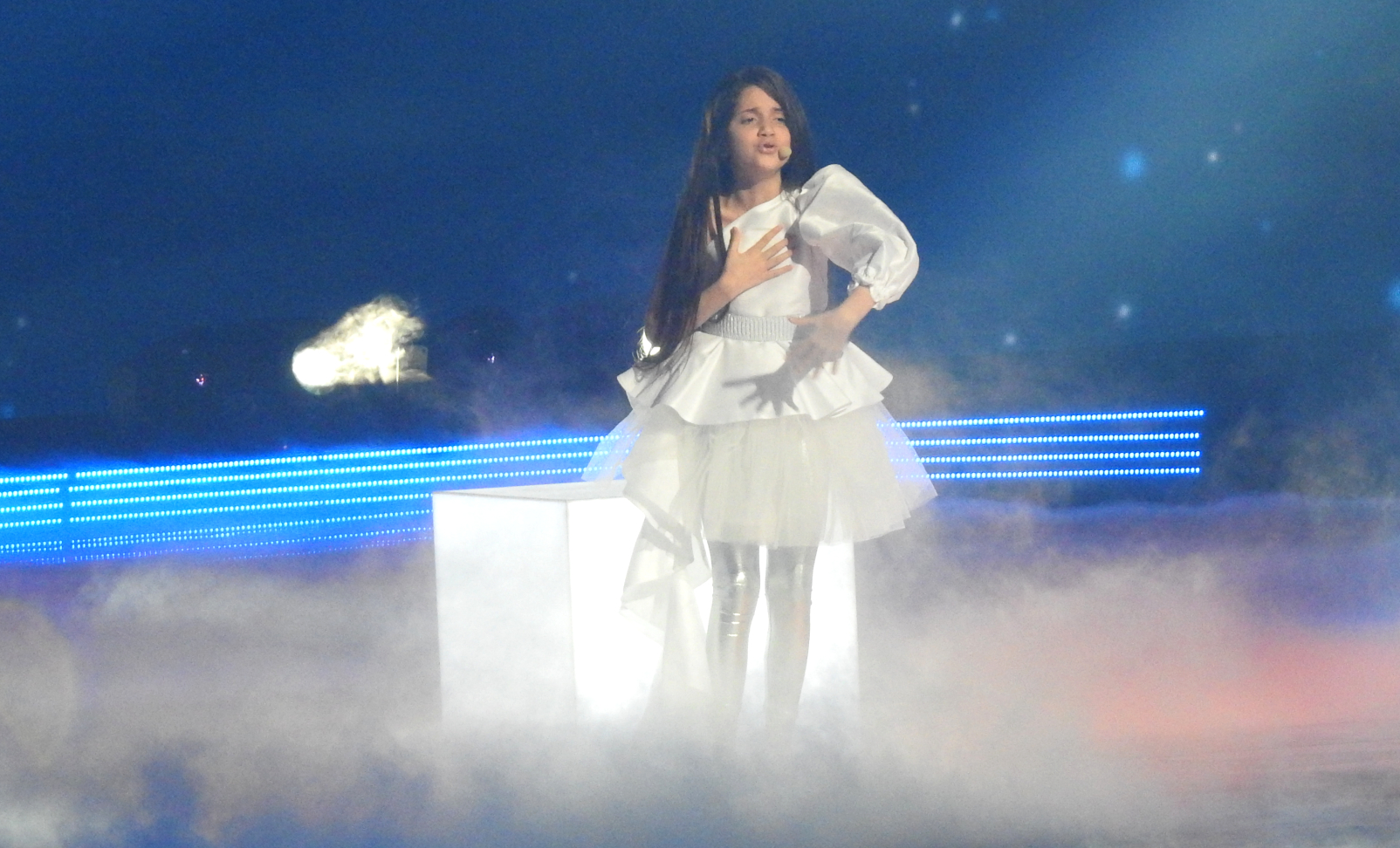

Background information
- Born: Fidan Hüseynova; 24 November 2005 (age 20); Moscow, Russia
- Origin: Azerbaijan
- Genres: Pop
- Occupation: Singer
- Instrument: Vocals
- Years active: 2014-present

Fidan Huseynova (born 24 November 2005 in Moscow) is a Russian-born Azerbaijani child singer. She represented Azerbaijan at the Junior Eurovision Song Contest 2018 with the song "I Wanna Be Like You". In 2021, she won the "Song of the Year" award at Zahara Kids Music Awards for her song "Bubble gum".

== At Junior Eurovision ==
During the opening ceremony and the running order draw which both took place on 19 November 2018, Azerbaijan was drawn to perform seventh on 25 November 2018, following Netherlands and preceding Belarus.

=== Voting ===
The same voting system that was introduced in the 2017 edition was used, where the results were determined by 50% online voting and 50% jury voting. Every participating broadcaster assembled a national jury that consisted of three music industry professionals and two children aged between 10 and 15 who were citizens of the country they represented. The rankings of those jurors were combined to make an overall top ten.

The online voting consisted of two phases. The first phase of the online voting began on 23 November 2018 when a recap of all the rehearsal performances was shown on the contest's website Junioreurovision.tv before the viewers could vote. After this, voters also had the option to watch longer one-minute clips from each participant's rehearsal. This first round of voting ended on 25 November at 15:59 CET. The second phase of the online voting took place during the live show and began right after the last performance and was open for 15 minutes. International viewers were able to vote for a minimum of three and a maximum of five songs. They were also able to vote for their own country's song. These votes were then turned into points which were determined by the percentage of votes received. For example, if a song received 10% of the votes, it received 10% of the available points.

Points awarded to Azerbaijan
| Score | Country |
|---|---|
| 12 points | |
| 10 points | |
| 8 points | |
| 7 points | |
| 6 points | Albania |
| 5 points | |
| 4 points | Italy |
| 3 points | Ireland; Wales |
| 2 points | |
| 1 point | Malta |
Azerbaijan received 30 points from the online vote

Points awarded by Azerbaijan
| Score | Country |
|---|---|
| 12 points | Russia |
| 10 points | Belarus |
| 8 points | Kazakhstan |
| 7 points | France |
| 6 points | Australia |
| 5 points | Malta |
| 4 points | Italy |
| 3 points | Ukraine |
| 2 points | Georgia |
| 1 point | Albania |

==== Detailed voting results ====
Detailed voting results from Azerbaijan
| Draw | Country | Juror A | Juror B | Juror C | Juror D | Juror E | Rank | Points |
|---|---|---|---|---|---|---|---|---|
| 01 | Ukraine | 5 | 4 | 2 | 15 | 14 | 8 | 3 |
| 02 | Portugal | 18 | 16 | 13 | 14 | 12 | 16 | |
| 03 | Kazakhstan | 1 | 5 | 5 | 3 | 4 | 3 | 8 |
| 04 | Albania | 10 | 12 | 9 | 18 | 10 | 10 | 1 |
| 05 | Russia | 2 | 2 | 1 | 5 | 5 | 1 | 12 |
| 06 | Netherlands | 17 | 15 | 14 | 12 | 8 | 13 | |
| 07 | Azerbaijan | | | | | | | |
| 08 | Belarus | 4 | 1 | 4 | 6 | 1 | 2 | 10 |
| 09 | Ireland | 11 | 17 | 15 | 17 | 15 | 17 | |
| 10 | Serbia | 16 | 9 | 16 | 13 | 16 | 15 | |
| 11 | Italy | 6 | 3 | 7 | 7 | 7 | 7 | 4 |
| 12 | Australia | 8 | 10 | 6 | 1 | 3 | 5 | 6 |
| 13 | Georgia | 9 | 7 | 8 | 8 | 6 | 9 | 2 |
| 14 | Israel | 12 | 18 | 11 | 11 | 11 | 11 | |
| 15 | France | 3 | 6 | 3 | 4 | 9 | 4 | 7 |
| 16 | Macedonia | 15 | 13 | 12 | 9 | 18 | 14 | |
| 17 | Armenia | 19 | 19 | 19 | 19 | 19 | 19 | |
| 18 | Wales | 14 | 14 | 17 | 16 | 17 | 18 | |
| 19 | Malta | 7 | 8 | 10 | 2 | 2 | 6 | 5 |
| 20 | Poland | 13 | 11 | 18 | 10 | 13 | 12 | |
