= Krylya =

Krylya may refer to:

- Wings (Kuzmin novel), a 1906 Russian novel by Mikhail Kuzmin
- Krylya (album), a 2005 album by Catharsis
- Krylya (Wings), Russia's winning entry in the 2017 Junior Eurovision Song Contest
