= Belarus in the Junior Eurovision Song Contest 2017 =

- Junior Eurovision Song Contest 2017
- Country: Belarus
- Selection process: National final
- Selection date: 25 August 2017

Competing entry
- Song: "I Am The One"
- Artist: Helena Meraai
- Songwriters: Rita Dakota; Helena Meraai

Placement
- Final result: 5th, 149 points

Participation chronology

Belarus was represented at the Junior Eurovision Song Contest 2017 which took place in Tbilisi, Georgia on 26 November 2017. The Belarusian entry for the 2017 contest in Tbilisi, Georgia was selected through a national final organised by the Belarusian broadcaster Belarusian Television and Radio Company (BTRC). A national final, which took place on 25 August 2017, saw ten competing acts participating in a televised production where the winner was determined by a 50/50 combination of votes from a jury made up of music professionals and a public telephone vote. Helena Meraai won the national final by receiving the most votes from both the professional jury and televoters and she represented Belarus in Georgia with the song "I Am The One".

== Background ==
Before the 2017 contest, Belarus had participated in the Junior Eurovision Song Contest fourteen times since its first entry at the inaugural contest in 2003. Belarus has taken part in every edition of the contest since 2003, and has won the contest twice: in 2005 with Ksenia Sitnik performing the song "My vmeste"; and again in 2007 with Alexey Zhigalkovich performing the entry "S druz'yami". The country hosted the 2010 contest in Minsk. In 2016, Alexander Minyonok represented Belarus in Valletta, Malta with the song "Musyka moikh pobed (Music is My Only Way)". It ended in 7th place with 177 points.

== Before Junior Eurovision ==
=== National final ===
The national final took place on 25 August 2017. It consisted of ten competing acts participating in a televised production where the winner was determined by a 50/50 combination of both telephone votes and the votes of a jury made up of music professionals. The show was opened by the previous year's representative, Alexander Minyonok, who performed his entry “Musyka moikh pobed (Music Is My Only Way)”. He also sang a cover version of Shawn Mendes' song "There's Nothing Holdin' Me Back". Moreover, some of the singers who did not manage to reach the national final, but showed potential at the live auditions, were also guests of the show. At the end of the show, it was revealed that Helena Meraai won the national final by receiving the most votes from both the professional jury and televoters.

Final – 25 August 2017
Draw	Artist	Song	Jury	Televote		Total	Place
Draw	Artist	Song	Jury	Votes	Points	Total	Place
1	Helena Meraai	"Ya samaya" (Я самая)	12	20,799	12	24	1
2	Anastasia Timofeyevich	"Volshebniy svet" (Волшебный свет)	2	1,174	2	4	10
3	Ruslana Panchyshyna	"Tantsui so mnoy" (Танцуй со мной)	8	2,006	8	16	4
4	Elena Mataras	"Ty reshaesh sam" (Ты решаешь сам)	3	1,603	5	8	7
5	Yaroslav Sokolikov	"Okean" (Океан)	10	1,687	6	16	3
6	Stefania Sokolova	"Mama" (Мама)	6	1,179	3	9	6
7	Arina Pehtereva & Anastasia Dmitrachkova	"Muzyka-Vselennaya" (Музыка-Вселенная)	4	967	1	5	8
8	Quartet of the National Center for Children's Art V. Mulyavina	"Prodolzhay idti" (Продолжай идти)	5	1,843	7	12	5
9	Maria Zhilina	"Vyshei" (Вышэй)	7	6,046	10	17	2
10	Anastasia Zhabko	"Letim k mechtam" (Летим к мечтам)	1	1,425	4	5	9

== Artist and song information ==
=== Helena Meraai ===
Helena Meraai
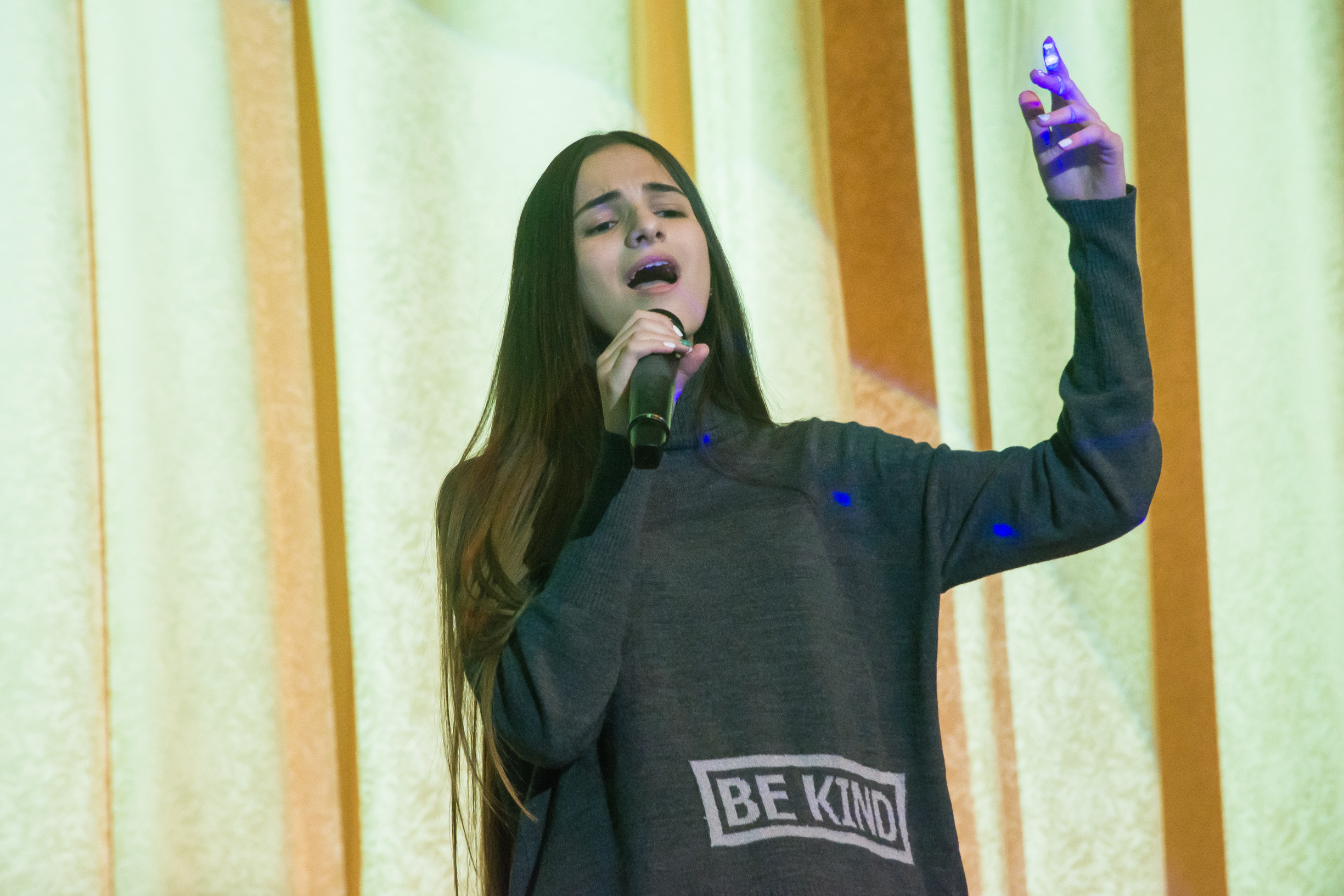

Background information
- Born: 2 May 2003 (age 22); Minsk, Belarus
- Genres: Pop
- Occupation: Singer
- Instrument: Vocals
- Years active: 2016–present

Helena Meraai (Russian: Хелена Мерааи; born 2 May 2003) is a Belarusian singer. She represented Belarus in the Junior Eurovision Song Contest 2017 with the song "I am the One". She took part in the Russian version of The Voice Kids, where she was defeated in the battle round. Shortly after, she represented Russia in the 2016 edition of the children's festival New Wave Junior as part of a trio, where she won along with two other girls. Her mother is Belarusian, while her father is from Syria.

On 26 October 2018, it was announced that Maraai would host the Junior Eurovision Song Contest 2018, alongside TV presenter Eugene Perlin and singer Zinaida Kupriyanovich, in Minsk. Meraai is the fourth person under the age of sixteen to host the Junior Eurovision Song Contest, after Ioana Ivan in 2006, Dmytro Borodin in 2009 and Lizi Japaridze in 2017, and is also the second former participant to host an edition of the contest. The following day it was confirmed that Meraai would host the green room. Earlier in the year she was one of the green room hosts alongside Ruslan Aslanov at the Belarusian national final. She took part in the 9th season Ukrainian version of X Factor, where she was eliminated in the "Bootcamp" round. In 2020 she hosted the Belarusian national final for the Eurovision Song Contest with Eugene Perlin.

Preceded by (Georgia (country)) Helen Kalandadze and Lizi Japaridze	Junior Eurovision Song Contest presenter 2018; With: Eugene Perlin and Zinaida Kupriyanovich	Succeeded by (Poland) Ida Nowakowska, Aleksander Sikora and Roksana Węgiel

=== "I Am the One" ===
(Belarus) "I Am the One"
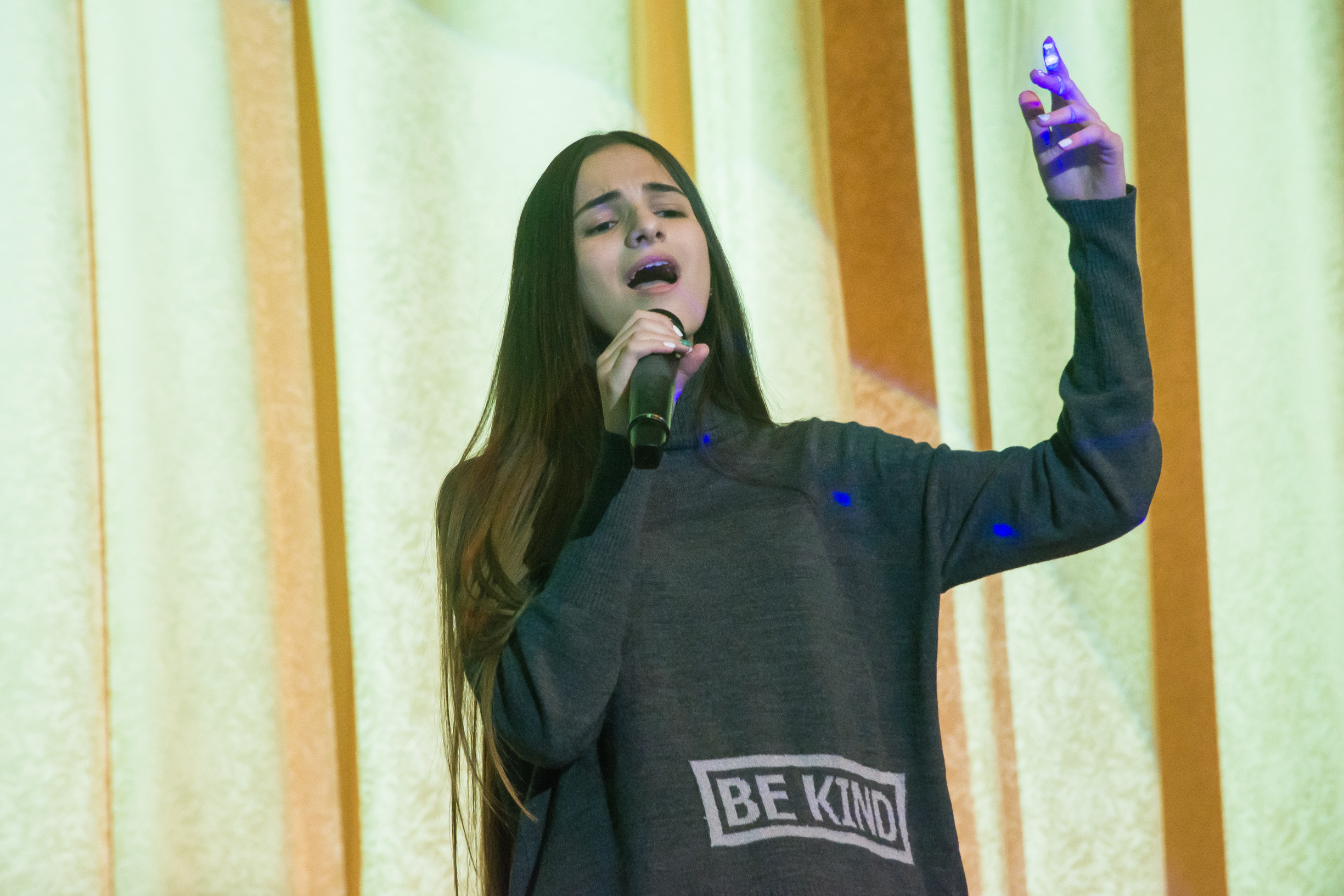

Junior Eurovision Song Contest 2017 entry
- Country: Belarus
- Artist(s): Helena Meraai
- Language: Russian
- Composer(s): Rita Dakota
- Lyricist(s): Rita Dakota

Finals performance
- Final result: 5th
- Final points: 149

Entry chronology
- ◄ "Musyka moikh pobed" (2016)
- "Time" (2018) ►

"I Am the One" is a song by Belarusian singer Helena Meraai. It represented Belarus in the Junior Eurovision Song Contest 2017.

== At Junior Eurovision ==
During the opening ceremony and the running order draw which both took place on 20 November 2017, Belarus was drawn to perform in position 5 on 26 November 2017, following Armenia and preceding Portugal.

=== Voting ===
In 2017, a new voting system was introduced, in which the results were determined by 50% online voting and 50% jury voting. Every participating broadcaster assembled a national jury that consisted of three music industry professionals and two children aged between 10 and 15 who were citizens of the country they represented. The rankings of those jurors were combined to make an overall top ten.

The online voting consisted of two phases. The first phase of the online voting began on 24 November 2017 when a recap of all the rehearsal performances was shown on the contest's website Junioreurovision.tv before the viewers could vote. After this, voters also had the option to watch longer one-minute clips from each participant's rehearsal. This first round of voting ended on 26 November at 15:59 CET. The second phase of the online voting took place during the live show and began right after the last performance and was open for 15 minutes. International viewers were able to vote for a minimum of three and a maximum of five songs. They were also able to vote for their own country's song. These votes were then turned into points which were determined by the percentage of votes received. For example, if a song received 10% of the votes, it received 10% of the available points.

Points awarded to Belarus
Score	Country
12 points	Malta
10 points	Portugal
8 points	Australia; Russia
7 points	Armenia
6 points	Cyprus
5 points	Albania; Georgia; Macedonia; Poland
4 points	Serbia
3 points	
2 points	Netherlands; Ukraine
1 point	Ireland
Belarus received 69 points from the online vote

Points awarded by Belarus
Score	Country
12 points	Georgia
10 points	Russia
8 points	Armenia
7 points	Australia
6 points	Netherlands
5 points	Ukraine
4 points	Poland
3 points	Italy
2 points	Malta
1 point	Macedonia

==== Detailed voting results ====
Detailed voting results from Belarus
Draw	Country	Juror A	Juror B	Juror C	Juror D	Juror E	Rank	Points
01	Cyprus	15	9	15	15	14	14	
02	Poland	7	8	8	7	7	7	4
03	Netherlands	5	7	5	8	5	5	6
04	Armenia	3	2	3	2	4	3	8
05	Belarus							
06	Portugal	12	13	12	14	9	13	
07	Ireland	9	12	9	13	10	12	
08	Macedonia	14	6	7	11	13	10	1
09	Georgia	2	1	1	1	3	1	12
10	Albania	13	15	14	12	15	15	
11	Ukraine	6	5	6	5	12	6	5
12	Malta	10	14	11	9	6	9	2
13	Russia	1	3	2	4	1	2	10
14	Serbia	11	10	10	10	11	11	
15	Australia	4	4	4	3	2	4	7
16	Italy	8	11	13	6	8	8	3
