= Ireland in the Junior Eurovision Song Contest 2017 =

- Junior Eurovision Song Contest 2017
- Country: Ireland
- Selection process: National selection: Junior Eurovision Éire
- Selection date: Semi-final; 22 October 2017; 29 October 2017; 5 November 2017; 12 November 2017; Final; 19 November 2017

Competing entry
- Song: "Súile Glasa"
- Artist: Muireann McDonnell
- Songwriters: James McGuire; Muireann McDonnell

Placement
- Final result: 15th, 54 points

Participation chronology

Ireland was represented at the Junior Eurovision Song Contest 2017, which took place on 26 November 2017, in Tbilisi, Georgia. The Irish broadcaster TG4 is responsible for organising their entry for the contest through a national selection show entitled Junior Eurovision Éire. The national final took place on 19 November 2017, while the semifinals took place between 22 October and 12 November. This was Ireland's third appearance at the Junior Eurovision Song Contest.

== Background ==
Prior to the 2017 Contest, Ireland had participated in the Junior Eurovision Song Contest twice since its debut in 2015. TG4 previously attempted to participate at the Junior Eurovision Song Contest 2014, but required funding from the Broadcasting Authority of Ireland (BAI), which was rejected.

== Before Junior Eurovision ==
The Irish broadcaster was included in the final list of participants of the EBU, which revealed that they would be participating at Junior Eurovision for the third time in their history. The mechanism for selecting their entrant and song was through the national selection show Junior Eurovision Éire, like in their two other appearances. The selection process is scheduled to take place every Sunday starting on 22 October, where thirty-two participants competed, and culminated into a final which took place on 19 November 2017.

=== Jury members ===
TG4 published details on the names of the professional jury who would determine the winner of the Junior Eurovision Éire 2017 and the representative for Ireland at the 2017 contest in November. They had all represented Ireland in the Eurovision Song Contest at least once in their careers.

Artist	ESC Year(s)	Song(s)	Place (semi-final)	Points (semi-final)	Place (final)	Points (final)
Linda Martin	1984	"Terminal 3"	No semi-finals		2	137
Linda Martin	1992	"Why Me?"	No semi-finals		1	155
Niamh Kavanagh	1993	"In Your Eyes"	No semi-finals		1	187
Niamh Kavanagh	2010	"It's for You"	9	67	23	25
Brian Kennedy	2006	"Every Song Is a Cry for Love"	10	93	10	79
Dustin the Turkey	2008	"Irelande Douze Pointe"	15	22	Failed to qualify	
Jedward	2011	"Lipstick"	8	68	8	119
Jedward	2012	"Waterline"	6	92	19	46
Brendan Murray	2017	"Dying to Try"	13	86	Failed to qualify	

The judging panel consisted of Fiachna Ó Braonáin and Bláthnaid Tracey, as well as a different guest judge each week.

== Junior Eurovision Éire ==
=== Semi Final 1 ===
The first semi final took place on 22 October 2017, in which Brendan Murray and Dustin the Turkey were the guest judges.

Draw	Artist	Song	Result
01	Muireann McDonnell	"Súile Glasa"	Final Duel
02	Hayley Keogh	"Is Cuimhin Liom"	Eliminated
03	Junior Sensation	"Can Os Ard"	Eliminated
04	Judy Langan	"Draíocht An Cheoil"	Final Duel, Wildcard
05	Rachel Haughney	"Táim Níos Láidre"	Eliminated
06	Kane Dunne	"Ar Chuala Tú"	Eliminated
07	Eloise Judge	"Domhain Foirfe"	Eliminated
08	Amy Hehir	"Féileacán I Mo Chroí"	Eliminated

Muireann McDonnell and Judy Langan both advanced to the final duel stage and performed their songs for the second time. After their second performances, the jury members selected Muireann McDonnell as the winner of semifinal 1 and advanced to the grand final on 19 November 2017. Judy Langan who lost the final duel received one of the two wildcards and advanced the final on 19 November 2017.

=== Semi Final 2 ===
The second semi final took place on 29 October 2017, in which Jedward were the guest judges.

Draw	Artist	Song	Result
01	Mini Mix	"Cairde Go Deo"	Wildcard
02	Gwanaelle Noval	"Lig Dom Lonrú"	Final Duel
03	Adria Gannon	"Sólás"	Eliminated
04	Róise Devlin	"Anonn agus Anall"	Eliminated
05	Aoife Goodson	"Diamaint"	Final Duel
06	Cailín Ní Thréinir	"Ní Mhaireann Aon Rud Go Deo"	Eliminated
07	Adam O'Connor	"Do Lá Úrnua É"	Eliminated
08	Chloe Winters	"Cá Bhfuil Tú Anois?"	Eliminated

Gwanaelle Noval and Aoife Goodson both advanced to the final duel stage and performed their songs for the second time. After their second performances, the jury members selected Gwanaelle Noval as the winner of semifinal 2 and advanced to the grand final on 19 November 2017. Mini Mix who was eliminated in Semi Final 2 but received one of the 2 Wildcards and proceeded to the Final.

=== Semi Final 3 ===
The second semi final took place on 5 November 2017, in which Dustin the Turkey and Brian Kennedy were the guest judges.

Draw	Artist	Song	Result
01	Úna Ní Mhistéil	"Álainn"	Final Duel
02	Cúigear Ceolmhar	"I Mochroí"	Eliminated
03	Holly Owens	"Saoirse"	Final Duel
04	Annie Bolger	"Éire Álainn"	Eliminated
05	Nutsa Bidzishvili	"An Bháisteach"	Eliminated
06	Logan McConnon	"Slán Leat"	Eliminated
07	Cathleen Garland	"A Ghrá Mo Chroí"	Eliminated
08	Ciara Doherty	"Tá Mé Anseo"	Eliminated

Úna Ní Mhistéil and Holly Owens both advanced to the final duel stage and performed their songs for the second time. After their second performances, the jury members selected Úna Ní Mhistéil as the winner of semifinal 3 and advanced to the grand final on 19 November 2017.

=== Semi Final 4 ===
The second semi final took place on 12 November 2017, in which Niamh Kavanagh was the guest judge.

Draw	Artist	Song	Result
01	Sinéad Carr	"Cén Fáth"	Final Duel
02	Walter McCabe	"Saor"	Eliminated
03	Orla McDermott	"Cairdeas"	Final Duel
04	Ella Pepper	"Ach Eolas Ar Ár nDuchas"	Eliminated
05	Nessa Markham	"Mamó"	Eliminated
06	Jirat O'Neill	"Spraoi As An Saol"	Eliminated
07	Olivia Foley	"Cróga"	Eliminated
08	Leah Keenam	"Táim Láidir	Eliminated

Sinéad Carr and Orla McDermott both advanced to the final duel stage and performed their songs for the second time. After their second performances, the jury members selected Sinéad Carr as the winner of semifinal 4 and advanced to the grand final on 19 November 2017.

=== Final ===
The grand final took place on 19 November 2017, in which Linda Martin was the guest judge.

Draw	Artist	Song	Result
01	Úna Ní Mhistéil	"Álainn"	Eliminated
02	Muireann McDonnell	"Súile Glasa"	Final Duel
03	Mini Mix	"Cairde Go Deo"	Eliminated
04	Sinéad Carr	"Cén Fáth?"	Eliminated
05	Gwenaelle Noval	"Lig Dom Lonrú"	Final Duel
06	Judy Langan	"Draíocht an Cheoil"	Eliminated

==== Final Duel ====
For the final, a sing-off was introduced between the top two contenders.

Draw	Artist	Song	Result
01	Muireann McDonnell	"Súile Glasa"	Winner
02	Gwenaelle Noval	"Lig Dom Lonrú"	Runner-up

Gwenaelle Noval and Muireann McDonnell were chosen by the judging panel to advance to the final duel. Muireann received the majority of votes from the panel and was awarded the Irish ticket to Tbilisi.

== At Junior Eurovision ==
During the opening ceremony and the running order draw which took place on 20 November 2017, Ireland was drawn to perform seventh on 26 November 2017, following Portugal and preceding Macedonia.

=== Voting ===
In 2017, a new voting system was introduced, in which the results were determined by 50% online voting and 50% jury voting. Every participating broadcaster assembled a national jury that consisted of three music industry professionals and two children aged between 10 and 15 who were citizens of the country they represented. The rankings of those jurors were combined to make an overall top ten.

The online voting consisted of two phases. The first phase of the online voting began on 24 November 2017 when a recap of all the rehearsal performances was shown on the contest's website Junioreurovision.tv before the viewers could vote. After this, voters also had the option to watch longer one-minute clips from each participant's rehearsal. This first round of voting ended on 26 November at 15:59 CET. The second phase of the online voting took place during the live show and began right after the last performance and was open for 15 minutes. International viewers were able to vote for a minimum of three and a maximum of five songs. They were also able to vote for their own country's song. These votes were then turned into points which were determined by the percentage of votes received. For example, if a song received 10% of the votes, it received 10% of the available points.

Points awarded to Ireland
Score	Country
12 points	
10 points	
8 points	
7 points	
6 points	
5 points	
4 points	Italy
3 points	Albania; Portugal
2 points	
1 point	Russia; Ukraine
Ireland received 42 points from the online vote

Points awarded by Ireland
Score	Country
12 points	Poland
10 points	Georgia
8 points	Australia
7 points	Albania
6 points	Serbia
5 points	Russia
4 points	Macedonia
3 points	Ukraine
2 points	Cyprus
1 point	Belarus

==== Detailed voting results ====
Detailed voting results from Ireland
Draw	Country	Juror A	Juror B	Juror C	Juror D	Juror E	Rank	Points
01	Cyprus	9	10	13	7	1	9	2
02	Poland	5	2	1	5	3	1	12
03	Netherlands	13	14	2	12	7	11	
04	Armenia	3	7	12	14	13	12	
05	Belarus	12	8	11	3	10	10	1
06	Portugal	8	11	14	13	6	13	
07	Ireland							
08	Macedonia	7	9	6	8	9	7	4
09	Georgia	1	5	3	2	5	2	10
10	Albania	2	1	5	9	14	4	7
11	Ukraine	6	6	7	6	15	8	3
12	Malta	11	15	15	15	12	15	
13	Russia	10	12	8	4	4	6	5
14	Serbia	4	3	9	10	8	5	6
15	Australia	14	4	4	1	2	3	8
16	Italy	15	13	10	11	11	14	
