= Armenia in the Junior Eurovision Song Contest 2017 =

- Junior Eurovision Song Contest 2017
- Country: Armenia
- Selection process: Internal Selection
- Selection date: Artist: 18 July 2017; Song: 23 October 2017

Competing entry
- Song: "Boomerang"
- Artist: Misha
- Songwriters: Avet Barseghyan; David Tserunyan; Artur Aghek; Vahram Petrosyan

Placement
- Final result: 6th, 148 points

Participation chronology

Armenia was represented at the Junior Eurovision Song Contest 2017 which took place on 26 November 2017 in Tbilisi, Georgia. The Armenian broadcaster Armenian Public Television (ARMTV) was responsible for organising their entry for the contest. Michael Grigoryan, also known as Misha, was internally selected on 18 July 2017 as the Armenian representative. His song for the contest, "Boomerang", was revealed on 23 October 2017.

== Background ==
Prior to the 2016 contest, Armenia had participated in the Junior Eurovision Song Contest nine times since its first entry in 2007, with their best result being in 2010 when they won with the song "Mama", performed by Vladimir Arzumanyan. Armenia went on to host the Junior Eurovision Song Contest 2011 in the Armenian capital Yerevan.

== Before Junior Eurovision ==
The Armenian broadcaster announced on 18 July 2017 that the Armenian entrant for the Junior Eurovision Song Contest 2017 was Michael Grigoryan. Prior to Junior Eurovision, he took part in the children's version of New Wave in 2016 with his song "Poqrik Karabakhtsi", getting a second place and being the jury's favorite. His entry for the contest in Georgia, "Boomerang", was presented to the public along with its official music video on 23 October 2017.

== At Junior Eurovision ==
During the opening ceremony and the running order draw which both took place on 20 November 2017, Armenia was drawn to perform fourth on 26 November 2017, following the Netherlands and preceding Belarus.

=== Voting ===
In 2017, a new voting system was introduced, in which the results were determined by 50% online voting and 50% jury voting. Every participating broadcaster assembled a national jury that consisted of three music industry professionals and two children aged between 10 and 15 who were citizens of the country they represented. The rankings of those jurors were combined to make an overall top ten.

The online voting consisted of two phases. The first phase of the online voting began on 24 November 2017 when a recap of all the rehearsal performances was shown on the contest's website Junioreurovision.tv before the viewers could vote. After this, voters also had the option to watch longer one-minute clips from each participant's rehearsal. This first round of voting ended on 26 November at 15:59 CET. The second phase of the online voting took place during the live show and began right after the last performance and was open for 15 minutes. International viewers were able to vote for a minimum of three and a maximum of five songs. They were also able to vote for their own country's song. These votes were then turned into points which were determined by the percentage of votes received. For example, if a song received 10% of the votes, it received 10% of the available points.

Points awarded to Armenia
Score	Country
12 points	Cyprus
10 points	Albania; Georgia; Poland; Russia; Ukraine
8 points	Belarus; Portugal
7 points	Malta
6 points	
5 points	
4 points	
3 points	Australia
2 points	Macedonia; Serbia
1 point	
Armenia received 56 points from the online vote

Points awarded by Armenia
Score	Country
12 points	Georgia
10 points	Netherlands
8 points	Ukraine
7 points	Belarus
6 points	Poland
5 points	Australia
4 points	Russia
3 points	Macedonia
2 points	Portugal
1 point	Cyprus

==== Detailed voting results ====
Detailed voting results from Armenia
Draw	Country	Juror A	Juror B	Juror C	Juror D	Juror E	Rank	Points
01	Cyprus	8	12	11	4	15	10	1
02	Poland	5	3	3	11	5	5	6
03	Netherlands	3	2	4	2	3	2	10
04	Armenia							
05	Belarus	4	5	6	5	4	4	7
06	Portugal	14	7	9	8	10	9	2
07	Ireland	10	13	15	12	9	13	
08	Macedonia	9	9	10	6	8	8	3
09	Georgia	1	1	1	1	1	1	12
10	Albania	15	14	14	14	13	15	
11	Ukraine	2	10	2	3	2	3	8
12	Malta	11	15	13	9	11	14	
13	Russia	7	8	7	7	7	7	4
14	Serbia	12	11	8	13	12	11	
15	Australia	6	6	5	10	6	6	5
16	Italy	13	4	12	15	14	12	
