= Georgia in the Junior Eurovision Song Contest 2017 =

- Junior Eurovision Song Contest 2017
- Country: Georgia
- Selection process: Internal selection
- Announcement date: Artist: 8 September 2017; Song: 20 October 2017

Competing entry
- Song: "Voice of The Heart"
- Artist: Grigol Kipshidze

Placement
- Final result: 2nd, 185 points

Participation chronology

Georgia was represented at the Junior Eurovision Song Contest 2017 as the host country after their victory in 2016 with the song "Mzeo" by Mariam Mamadashvili. Their entry was decided through an internal selection. They were represented by Grigol Kipshidze and the song "Voice of The Heart".

== Background ==
Prior to the 2017 Contest, Georgia had participated in the Junior Eurovision Song Contest ten times since its debut in 2007, and since then they have never missed a single contest. Georgia is also the most successful country in the competition, with three victories in 2008, 2011 and 2016.

== Before Junior Eurovision ==
On 29 July 2017 the Georgian broadcaster GPB announced they were going to select their entrant internally, opening the submissions period until 1 September 2017. The winner of the selection process was to be decided by a professional jury. Then, on 6 September 2017, the GPB announced that their entrant would be revealed later that week on 8 September 2017; whereas the song will be revealed at a later point. They did as expected, and on 8 September 2017 the GPB confirmed that their representative for the 2017 contest is Grigol Kipshidze. Prior to his Junior Eurovision experience, Kipshidze studied at the National Center for Folklore between 2011 and 2015, and in 2014 he entered the Vocal Academy of Tbilisi. He has also participated in various singing contests, achieving the most successful result at the 2017 edition of X-Factor Georgia, where he made it to the final. He was part of the Georgian jury at the Junior Eurovision Song Contest 2024.

== At Junior Eurovision ==
During the opening ceremony and the running order draw which took place on 20 November 2017, Georgia was drawn to perform ninth on 26 November 2017, following Macedonia and preceding Albania.

=== Voting ===
In 2017, a new voting system was introduced, in which the results were determined by 50% online voting and 50% jury voting. Every participating broadcaster assembled a national jury that consisted of three music industry professionals and two children aged between 10 and 15 who were citizens of the country they represented. The rankings of those jurors were combined to make an overall top ten.

The online voting consisted of two phases. The first phase of the online voting began on 24 November 2017 when a recap of all the rehearsal performances was shown on the contest's website Junioreurovision.tv before the viewers could vote. After this, voters also had the option to watch longer one-minute clips from each participant's rehearsal. This first round of voting ended on 26 November at 15:59 CET. The second phase of the online voting took place during the live show and began right after the last performance and was open for 15 minutes. International viewers were able to vote for a minimum of three and a maximum of five songs. They were also able to vote for their own country's song. These votes were then turned into points which were determined by the percentage of votes received. For example, if a song received 10% of the votes, it received 10% of the available points.

Points awarded to Georgia
Score	Country
12 points	Albania; Armenia; Belarus; Poland; Russia; Ukraine
10 points	Australia; Ireland; Macedonia; Malta
8 points	Serbia
7 points	Netherlands; Portugal
6 points	Italy
5 points	
4 points	
3 points	Cyprus
2 points	
1 point	
Georgia received 42 points from the online vote

Points awarded by Georgia
Score	Country
12 points	Russia
10 points	Armenia
8 points	Ukraine
7 points	Australia
6 points	Italy
5 points	Belarus
4 points	Portugal
3 points	Serbia
2 points	Poland
1 point	Netherlands

==== Detailed voting results ====
Detailed voting results from Georgia
Draw	Country	Juror A	Juror B	Juror C	Juror D	Juror E	Rank	Points
01	Cyprus	13	14	15	14	15	15	
02	Poland	9	5	14	8	10	9	2
03	Netherlands	6	10	13	5	13	10	1
04	Armenia	5	3	1	7	3	2	10
05	Belarus	2	1	11	10	12	6	5
06	Portugal	10	11	12	6	2	7	4
07	Ireland	11	8	10	13	14	13	
08	Macedonia	14	9	9	9	9	12	
09	Georgia							
10	Albania	15	12	5	15	11	14	
11	Ukraine	3	6	2	3	7	3	8
12	Malta	12	13	6	12	6	11	
13	Russia	1	2	3	1	1	1	12
14	Serbia	8	15	7	11	4	8	3
15	Australia	4	4	8	2	8	4	7
16	Italy	7	7	4	4	5	5	6
