= Karavan Lyubvi =

- Directed by: Sofia Rotaru
- Starring: Sofia Rotaru
- Music by: V. Matetskiy
- Country of origin: Soviet Union
- Original languages: Ukrainian; Russian

Production
- Producer: Sofia Rotaru
- Running time: 33 minutes

Original release
- Network: Soviet Central Television
- Release: 1 January 1991

Karavan Lyubvi (Russian: Караван Любви; English: "Caravan of Love") is a Soviet musical television film starring Sofia Rotaru.

== History ==
The foundation ideas for the film appeared after Sofia Rotaru performed the song "Karavan lyubvi". The song was later (in 1993) included in the album with the same name: Caravan of Love. The musical film became a fruit of joint production of the Main Edition of Musical Programmes of the Central Television and of the theatre studio Club in 1991.

== Performed songs ==
Sofia Rotaru performed the following songs:

1. Karavan lyubvi
2. I'm Missing You a Lot
3. Snowflake
4. Such a Story
5. Touch Me
6. When the Separation is Closer
7. Tea Roses in the Compartment
8. Echo
- Composer: V. Matestskiy
- Lyrics: M. Shabrov, G. Pozhenyan

== Episodic roles ==
- Brass choir ensemble directed by Vladimir Matetskiy
- Show — Balley "Todes" (artistic director Alla Duhova)

== See also ==
- Song Caravan of Love (song)
- Album Caravan of Love (album)
