= Portugal in the Junior Eurovision Song Contest 2017 =

- Junior Eurovision Song Contest 2017
- Participating broadcaster: Rádio e Televisão de Portugal (RTP)
- Country: Portugal
- Selection process: Artist: Júniores de Portugal; Song: Internal selection
- Selection date: Artist: 5 October 2017; Song: 29 September 2017

Competing entry
- Song: "Youtuber"
- Artist: Mariana Venâncio
- Songwriters: João Cabrita; Mariana Andrade

Placement
- Final result: 14th, 54 points

Participation chronology

Portugal was represented at the Junior Eurovision Song Contest 2017 with the song "Youtuber", written by João Cabrita and Mariana Andrade, and performed by Mariana Venâncio. The Portuguese participating broadcaster, Rádio e Televisão de Portugal (RTP), organised a national final in order to select its performer for the contest, after having previously selected the song internally.

== Before Junior Eurovision ==
=== Júniores de Portugal ===
The singer who performed the Portuguese entry for the Junior Eurovision Song Contest 2017 was selected through the singing competition Júniores de Portugal ("Juniors of Portugal"). 5 artists participated in a televised production, with the winner determined by a 50/50 combination of both public vote and the votes of a jury invited by the production. The artists all performed a JESC song and a cover song. The competing song, titled "Youtuber", written by João Cabrita and Mariana Andrade, was revealed on 29 September 2017. The jury members of Júniores de Portugal were:

- Carlos Mendes – represented Portugal in Eurovision 1968 and 1972 with the songs "Verão" and "A festa da vida" and placed 11th with 5 points and 7th with 90 points respectively.
- Inês Santos – represented Portugal in Eurovision 1998 as a member of the group Alma Lusa with the song "Se eu te pudesse abraçar"
- Pedro Gonçalves – participated in Festival da Canção 2017 with the song "Don't Walk Away" and placed 6th with 13 points.

==== Final ====
The final, hosted by Jorge Gabriel and Sónia Araújo, took place on 5 October 2017 in RTP Studios in Porto. Filipa Ferreira and Mariana Venâncio was tied at 9 points each but since Mariana Venâncio received the most votes from the televoting she was declared the winner.

Final – 5 October 2017
Artist	Draw	Song	Draw	Cover	Jury	Televote	Total	Place
Filipa Ferreira	1	"Youtuber"	6	"La Isla Bonita"	5	4	9	2
Mariana Venâncio	2	"Youtuber"	7	"A Máquina (Acordou)"	4	5	9	1
Matilde Leite	3	"Youtuber"	8	"O Amor é Assim"	3	2	5	4
Duarte Valença	4	"Youtuber"	9	"Loucos"	1	1	2	5
Margarida Lima	5	"Youtuber"	10	"Let It Be"	2	3	5	3

== At Junior Eurovision ==
During the opening ceremony and the running order draw which both took place on 20 November 2017, Portugal was drawn to perform in position 6 on 26 November 2017, following Belarus and preceding Ireland.

=== Voting ===
In 2017, a new voting system was introduced, in which the results were determined by 50% online voting and 50% jury voting. Every participating broadcaster assembled a national jury that consisted of three music industry professionals and two children aged between 10 and 15 who were citizens of the country they represented. The rankings of those jurors were combined to make an overall top ten.

The online voting consisted of two phases. The first phase of the online voting began on 24 November 2017 when a recap of all the rehearsal performances was shown on the contest's website Junioreurovision.tv before the viewers could vote. After this, voters also had the option to watch longer one-minute clips from each participant's rehearsal. This first round of voting ended on 26 November at 15:59 CET. The second phase of the online voting took place during the live show and began right after the last performance and was open for 15 minutes. International viewers were able to vote for a minimum of three and a maximum of five songs. They were also able to vote for their own country's song. These votes were then turned into points which were determined by the percentage of votes received. For example, if a song received 10% of the votes, it received 10% of the available points.

Points awarded to Portugal
Score	Country
12 points	
10 points	
8 points	
7 points	
6 points	
5 points	
4 points	Georgia
3 points	Italy
2 points	Armenia
1 point	
Portugal received 45 points from the online vote

Points awarded by Portugal
Score	Country
12 points	Russia
10 points	Belarus
8 points	Armenia
7 points	Georgia
6 points	Australia
5 points	Poland
4 points	Ukraine
3 points	Ireland
2 points	Serbia
1 point	Macedonia

==== Detailed voting results ====
Detailed voting results from Portugal
Draw	Country	Juror A	Juror B	Juror C	Juror D	Juror E	Rank	Points
01	Cyprus	12	12	9	11	13	12	
02	Poland	6	11	2	6	5	6	5
03	Netherlands	15	13	8	12	15	14	
04	Armenia	3	1	6	5	8	3	8
05	Belarus	1	5	5	4	2	2	10
06	Portugal							
07	Ireland	10	7	11	7	6	8	3
08	Macedonia	7	15	12	10	4	10	1
09	Georgia	4	4	1	9	7	4	7
10	Albania	9	14	13	15	11	13	
11	Ukraine	8	8	10	8	3	7	4
12	Malta	13	10	14	14	14	15	
13	Russia	2	2	3	3	1	1	12
14	Serbia	11	6	7	13	10	9	2
15	Australia	5	3	5	2	12	5	6
16	Italy	14	9	15	1	9	11	
