= Alla Duhova =

Russian choreographer

Alla Dukhova
- Born: Alla Vladimirovna Duhova; Kos, Soviet Union
- Occupation: Choreographer
- Years active: 1987–present
- Known for: Founder and director of contemporary ballet group Todes

Alla Vladimirovna Duhova (Russian: Алла Владимировна Духова; born 29 November 1966) is a Russian choreographer. She is best known for establishing the dance troupe Todes.

== Career ==
Alla Duhova was born in the village of Kos in what is now Perm region. However, Duhova spent her childhood in Riga, Latvia as her family moved there soon after her birth. She has been dancing since the age of 11 when she joined folk dance ensemble Ivushka. For a brief time she worked at circus. In the early 1980s she took part in female dance group known as Experiment. It was among the first to perform breakdance in the Soviet Union. The female group of ballet dancers from Riga merged in March 1987 with male break dancers from Leningrad (Saint Petersburg), and took up the name Todes. Duhova was 19 years old when she managed to mix the different styles of dance. Todes soon moved to Moscow.

In 2015 Duhova appeared in jury of a Channel One TV-show Танцуй! (Dance!). She has also appeared on 17 May 2016 in a jury for a beauty competition for the Cultural Center for Arts of the National Aviation University in Ukraine.

Duhova has her own clothing brand.

Duhova has been awarded by president Vladimir Putin for her work. On 8 March 2001 she was among 15 women to be awarded in Moscow by Putin.

=== Todes ballet ===
Todes ballet is a Russian contemporary ballet dance troupe, and a ballet style. It has been named after a death spiral, which is an element performed in figure skating.

The group has been growing since the 1990s when there were around 150 dancers involved. As of 2014 there were 35,000 students in approximately 90 schools involved with the ballet style. The ballet style is also taught in Latvia.

Todes has been awarded at various international dance festivals.

== Personal life ==
Duhova has kept her personal life mostly private. She has married for a third time, and has two sons from previous marriages.

== See also ==
- List of dance personalities
- Karavan lyubvi
- Russian ballet
- Vlad Sokolovskiy
