= Junior Eurovision Song Contest 2017 =

International song competition for youth

- Shine Bright

Date and venue
- Final: 26 November 2017
- Venue: Olympic Palace; Tbilisi, Georgia

Organisation
- Organiser: European Broadcasting Union (EBU)
- Executive supervisor: Jon Ola Sand

Production
- Host broadcaster: Georgian Public Broadcaster (GPB)
- Directors: Simon Gibney; Gordon Bonello
- Executive producer: Sergi Gvarjaladze
- Presenters: Helen Kalandadze; Lizi Japaridze

Participants
- Number of entries: 16
- Returning countries: Portugal
- Non-returning countries: Bulgaria; Israel
- Participation map: Competing countries Countries that participated in the past but not in 2017

Vote
- Voting system: Each country's professional jury award 12, 10, 8–1 points to their 10 favourite songs. International viewers vote for 3–5 songs, and votes are converted to points by proportional representation.
- Winning song: Russia "Wings"

The Junior Eurovision Song Contest 2017 was the fifteenth edition of the Junior Eurovision Song Contest, held on 26 November 2017 at the Olympic Palace, in Tbilisi, Georgia, and presented by Helen Kalandadze and Lizi Japaridze. It was organised by the European Broadcasting Union (EBU) and host broadcaster Georgian Public Broadcaster (GPB), who staged the event after winning the 2016 contest for Georgia with the song "Mzeo" by Mariam Mamadashvili. This was the fifth time that the contest was hosted by the previous year's winning broadcaster. The visual design and contest slogan, "Shine Bright", were revealed in May 2017.

Broadcasters from sixteen countries participated in the contest, which saw the return of Portugal for the first time since 2007 and the withdrawals of Bulgaria and Israel.

The winner was Russia with the song "Wings" by Polina Bogusevich, marking the second time that Russia has won the Junior Eurovision Song Contest, and the first time since The Tolmachevy Twins in 2006, and the third overall victory for the country in any Eurovision-related events. The last victory in any Eurovision event for Russia was when Dima Bilan won the Eurovision Song Contest 2008 in Belgrade. Georgia and Australia finished in second and third place, respectively.

== Location ==
The Olympic Palace (marked in blue) was announced as the new venue, after the larger capacity Tbilisi Sports Palace (red) was considered unsuitable for hosting the contest.

During the Winner's Press Conference of the Junior Eurovision Song Contest 2016, Jon Ola Sand - Head of Live Events, announced that the EBU would invite broadcasting members to submit applications to host the 2017 contest, which would take place on 26 November 2017.

Georgian Public Broadcaster (GPB) announced on 22 November 2016 that they had begun talks with the EBU in connection to hosting the 2017 contest. The first refusal of hosting rights to the winning country of the previous is something that was introduced by the EBU since the 2013 contest.

The EBU confirmed in February 2017 that the contest would be hosted by Georgia. This was the first Eurovision event hosted by the country, despite them winning a record three times. It was confirmed on 26 February 2017 that Tbilisi would host the contest.

=== Venue ===
On 16 March 2017, it was announced that the Tbilisi Sports Palace would be the host venue for the contest. However, on 9 August 2017, the venue was changed to the 4,000-capacity Olympic Palace in Tbilisi which was considered more suitable for hosting the contest.

Officially opened on 13 July 2015 by Georgian Prime Minister, Irakli Garibashvili, the venue was built to host the 2015 European Youth Summer Olympic Festival. The complex features two halls that are capable of hosting several sporting events.

== Participants ==
On 9 August 2017, the EBU released the official list of participants with 16 competing countries. Portugal returned to the contest, marking their first appearance since 2007, while Bulgaria and Israel withdrew, the latter after returning to the contest for a one-off appearance in 2016.

Prior to the event, a digital compilation album featuring all the songs from the 2017 contest was put together by the European Broadcasting Union and released by Universal Music Group on 10 November 2017.

Participants of the Junior Eurovision Song Contest 2017
Country	Broadcaster	Artist	Song	Language	Songwriter(s)
Albania	RTSH	Ana Kodra	"Don't Touch My Tree (Mos ma prekni pemën)"	Albanian, English	Jorgo Papingji; Kristi Popa
Armenia	AMPTV	Misha	"Boomerang"	Armenian, English	Artur Aghek; Avet Barseghyan; Vahram Petrosyan; David Tserunyan
Australia	ABC	Isabella Clarke	"Speak Up"	English	Toby Chew Lee; Cameron Hollywood Nacson; Chloe Papandrea; Jess Porfiri
Belarus	BTRC	Helena Meraai	"I Am the One"	Russian	Rita Dakota; Helena Meraai
Cyprus	CyBC	Nicole Nicolaou	"I Wanna Be a Star"	Greek, English	Constantinos Christoforou
Georgia	GPB	Grigol Kipshidze	"Voice of the Heart"	Georgian	Giga Kukhianidze; Temo Sajaia
Ireland	TG4	Muireann McDonnell	"Súile Glasa"	Irish	Muireann McDonnell; James McGuire; Robert McGuire
Italy	RAI	Maria Iside Fiore	"Scelgo (My Choice)"	Italian, English	Maria Iside Fiore; Marco Iardella; Fabrizio Palaferri; Stefano Rigamonti
Macedonia	MRT	Mina Blažev	"Dancing Through Life"	Macedonian, English	Aleksandar Masevski
Malta	PBS	Gianluca Cilia	"Dawra Tond"	English, Maltese	Emil Calleja Bayliss; Dominic Cini
Netherlands	AVROTROS	Fource	"Love Me"	Dutch, English	Joost Griffioen; Stas Swaczyna
Poland	TVP	Alicja Rega	"Mój dom"	Polish	Marek Kościkiewicz
Portugal	RTP	Mariana Venâncio	"Youtuber"	Portuguese	Mariana Andrade; João Cabrita
Russia	VGTRK	Polina Bogusevich	"Wings"	Russian, English	Taras Demchuk
Serbia	RTS	Irina Brodić and Jana Paunović	"Ceo svet je naš" (Цео свет је наш)	Serbian	Irina Brodić; Ognjen Cvekić; Lejla Hot; Jana Paunović
Ukraine	UA:PBC	Anastasiya Baginska	"Don't Stop"	Ukrainian, English	Anastasiya Baginska; Kateryna Komar

== Format ==
=== Visual design ===
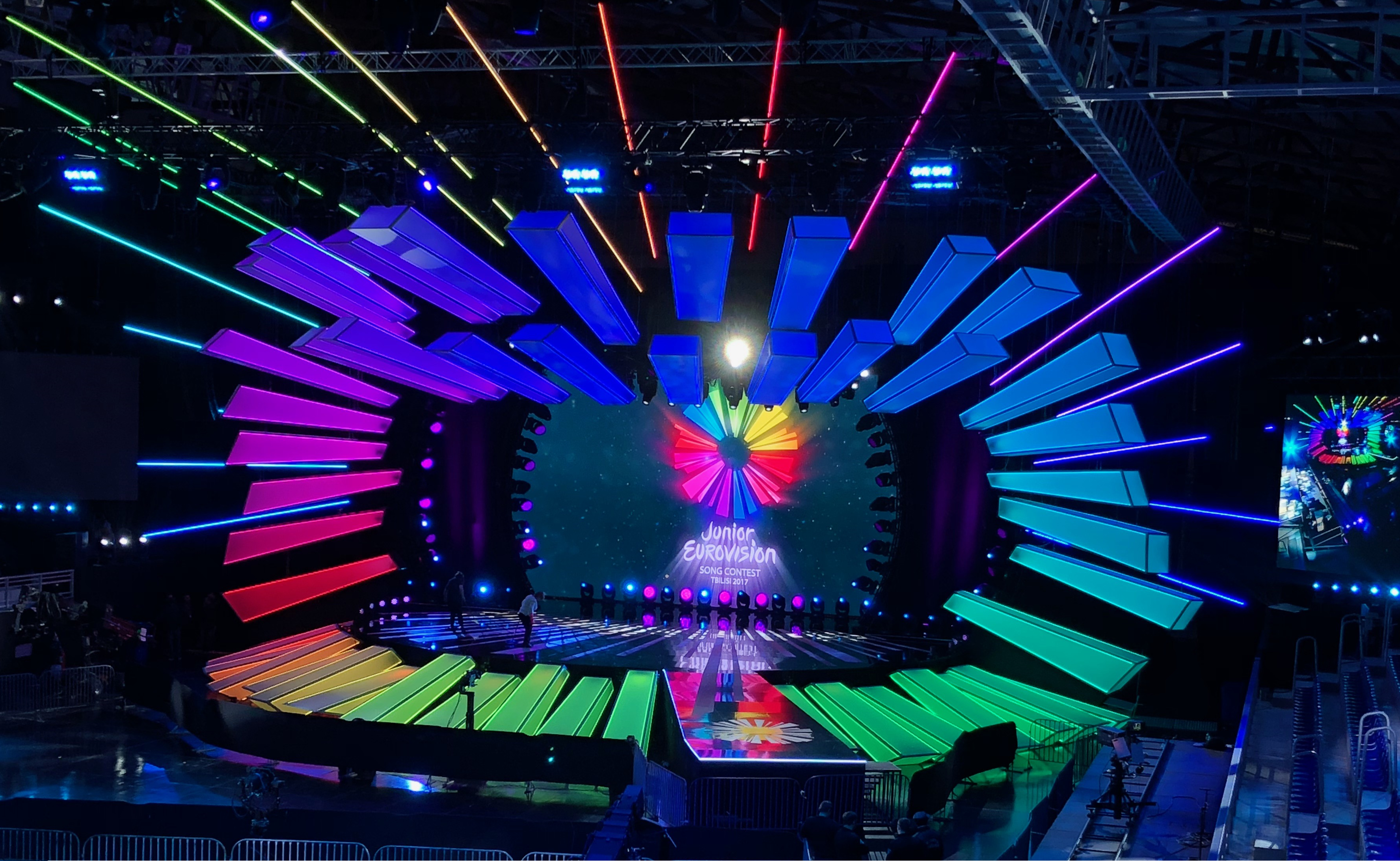
Olympic Palace's stage

The theme for the contest, Shine Bright, was unveiled on 12 May 2017 during a press conference prior to the 2017 Eurovision Song Contest in Kyiv. The emblem is a multi-coloured, stylized sun, representing a "burst" of expression; Jon Ola Sand explained that the theme reflected the goal of the Junior Eurovision Song Contest to give youth "a moment to shine and an opportunity to showcase their full potential as young artists".

=== Language ===
The original rules of the competition were changed, allowing up to 40% of each song to be in a language other than the national language of the representative's country, instead of 25% as in previous years. This allowed countries, such as the winner, Russia, to have both a verse and a chorus in English, rather than just a chorus.

=== Hosts ===
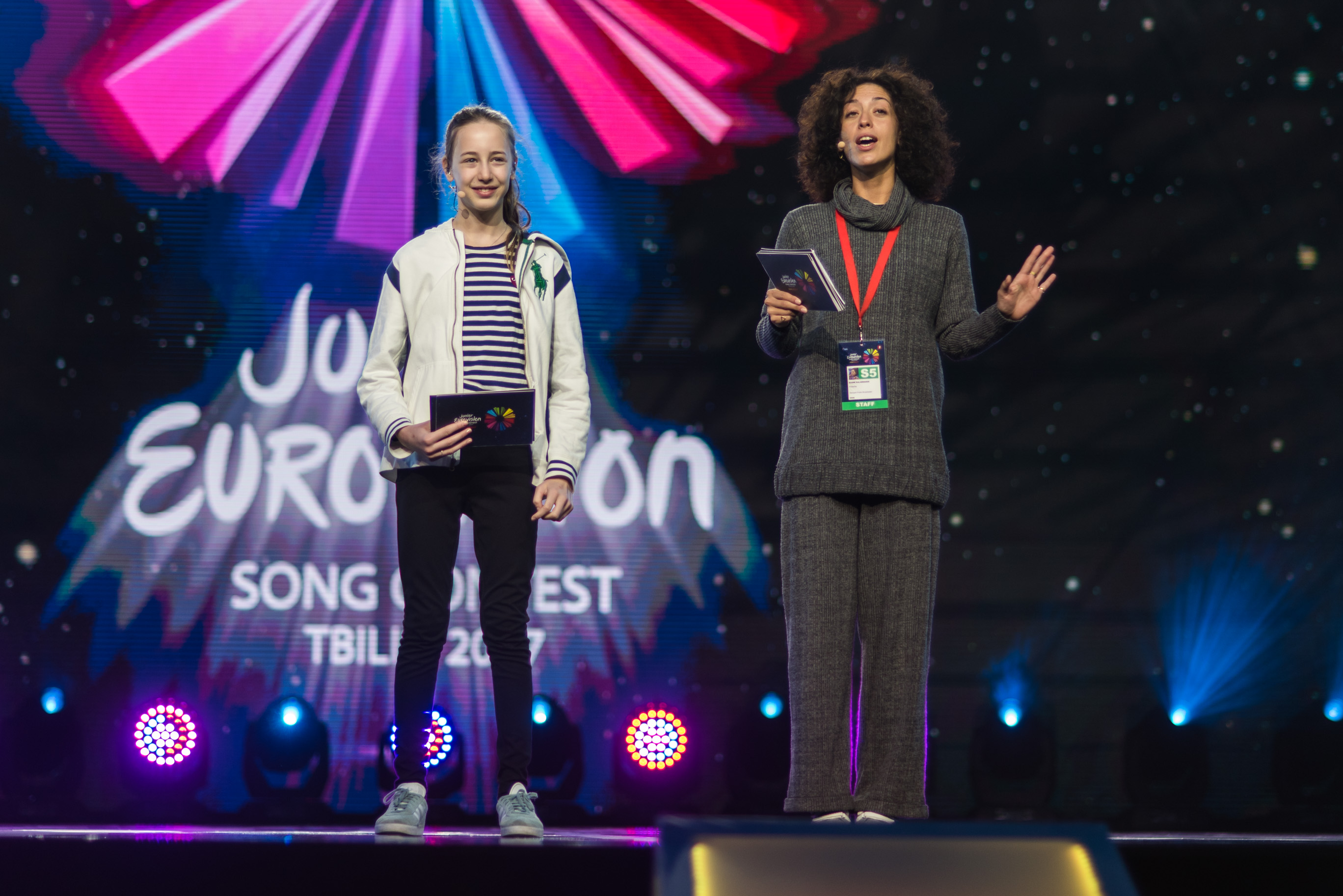
Japaridze and Kalandadze during dress rehearsal

On 3 October 2017, it was announced that Helen Kalandadze and Lizi Japaridze would host the contest. Japaridze is the third person under the age of sixteen to ever host the Junior Eurovision Song Contest, after Ioana Ivan in 2006 and Dmytro Borodin in 2009, and also the first former participant to host an edition of the contest. Japaridze previously represented Georgia in the Junior Eurovision Song Contest 2014, where she placed eleventh with the song "Happy Day". Kalandadze is a television presenter and singer, who previously was a backing singer for Georgia's 2010 Eurovision entry "Shine" by Sofia Nizharadze.

=== Voting ===
The results were determined by national juries and an online audience vote. Every country used a national jury that consisted of three music industry professionals and two kids aged between 10 and 15 who were citizens of the country they represent. The first phase of the online voting started on 24 November 2017 when a recap of all the rehearsal performances were shown on the official website before the viewers could vote. Following this recap, voters had the option to watch longer one-minute clips from each participant's rehearsal. This first round of voting ended on 26 November at 15:59 CET. The second phase of the online voting took place during the live show and started after the last performance and was open for 15 minutes. International viewers could vote for a minimum of three countries and a maximum of five. For the first time, viewers could also vote for their own country's song.

The number of points were determined by the percentage of votes received. The public vote counted for 50% of the final result, while the other 50% came from the professional juries.

=== Trophy ===
The trophy was designed by Kjell Engman of the Swedish glass company Kosta Boda. Engman also designed the adult contest trophy. From this year, the design of the trophy was unified and awarded to the subsequent winners. The main trophy was a glass microphone with colored lines inside the upper part, which symbolize the flow of sound.

== Contest overview ==
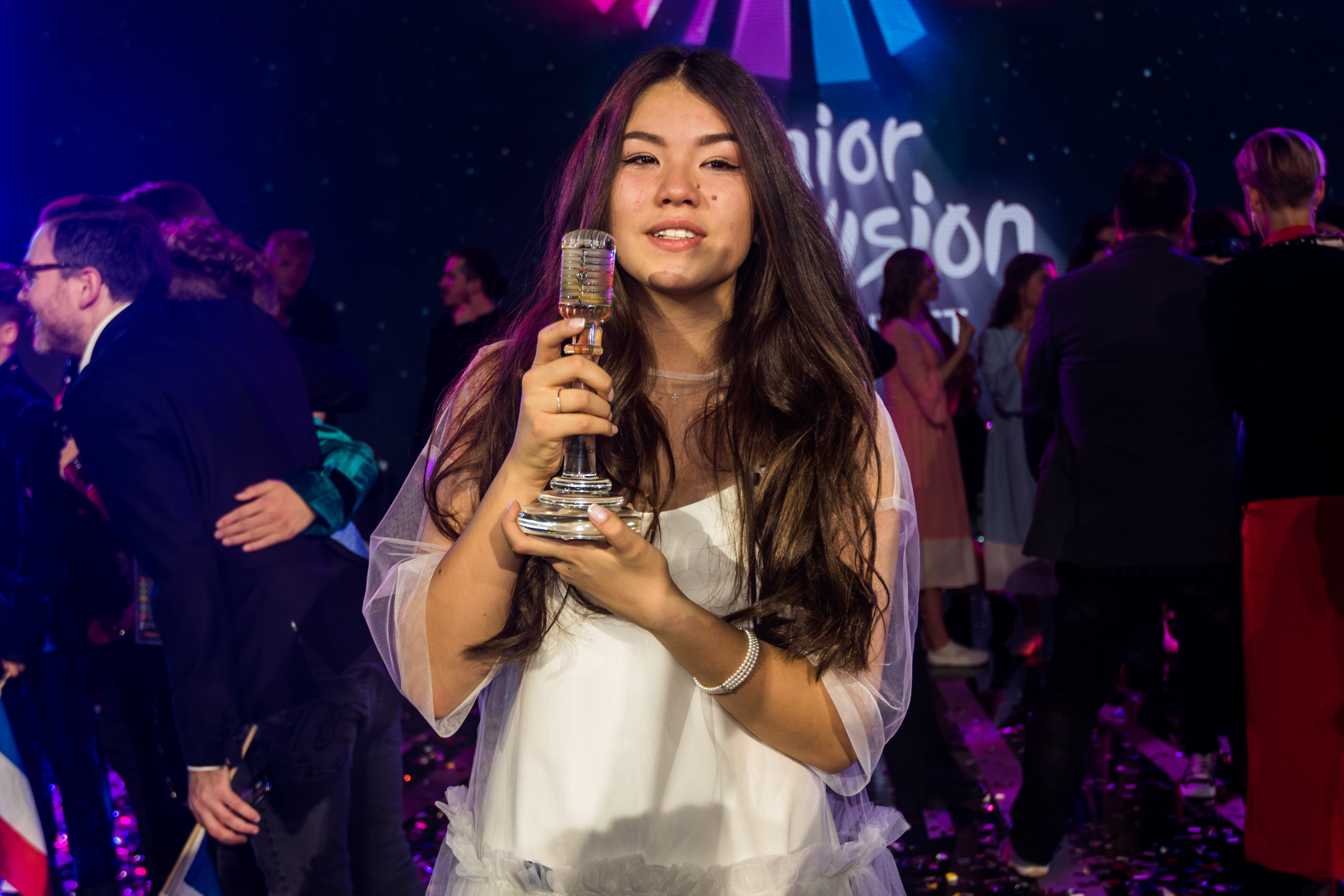
Polina Bogusevich with the trophy

The event took place on 26 November 2017 at 18:00 GET (16:00 CET). Sixteen countries participated, with the running order published on 20 November 2017. All the countries competing were eligible to vote with the jury vote, as well as participating and non-participating countries under an aggregated international online vote, eligible to vote. Russia won with 188 points. Georgia came second with 185 points and won the jury vote, with Australia, the Netherlands (who won the online vote), and Belarus completing the top five. Macedonia, Albania, Portugal, Ireland, Cyprus occupied the bottom five positions.

The opening of the show featured last year's winner Mariam Mamadashvili performing her winning entry "Mzeo" with a choir and was followed by the traditional flag parade accompanied by the theme song "Shine Bright", composed by Giga Kukhianidze and Gordon Bonello.

R/O	Country	Artist	Song	Points	Place
1	Cyprus	Nicole Nicolaou	"I Wanna Be a Star"	45	16
2	Poland	Alicja Rega	"Mój dom"	138	8
3	Netherlands	Fource	"Love Me"	156	4
4	Armenia	Misha	"Boomerang"	148	6
5	Belarus	Helena Meraai	"I Am the One"	149	5
6	Portugal	Mariana Venâncio	"Youtuber"	54	14
7	Ireland	Muireann McDonnell	"Súile Glasa"	54	15
8	Macedonia	Mina Blažev	"Dancing Through Life"	69	12
9	Georgia	Grigol Kipshidze	"Voice of the Heart"	185	2
10	Albania	Ana Kodra	"Don't Touch My Tree (Mos ma prekni pemën)"	67	13
11	Ukraine	Anastasiya Baginska	"Don't Stop"	147	7
12	Malta	Gianluca Cilia	"Dawra Tond"	107	9
13	Russia	Polina Bogusevich	"Wings"	188	1
14	Serbia	Irina Brodić and Jana Paunović	"Ceo svet je naš"	92	10
15	Australia	Isabella Clarke	"Speak Up"	172	3
16	Italy	Maria Iside Fiore	"Scelgo (My Choice)"	86	11

=== Spokespersons ===
1. Cyprus – Maria Christophorou
2. Poland – Dominika
3. Netherlands – Thijs Schlimback
4. Armenia – Lilit Tokhatyan
5. Belarus – Saba Karazanashvili
6. Portugal – Duarte Valença
7. Ireland – Walter McCabe
8. Macedonia – Kjara Blažev
9. Georgia – Lizi Tavberidze
10. Albania – Sabjana Rizvanu
11. Ukraine – Sofia Rol
12. Malta – Mariam Andghuladze
13. Russia – Tonya Volodina
14. Serbia – Mina Grujić
15. Australia – Liam Clarke
16. Italy – Sofia Bartoli

== Detailed voting results ==
Split results
Place	Combined		Jury		Online Vote	
Place	Country	Points	Country	Points	Country	Points
1	Russia	188	Georgia	143	Netherlands	112
2	Georgia	185	Russia	122	Malta	81
3	Australia	172	Australia	93	Australia	79
4	Netherlands	156	Armenia	92	Belarus	69
5	Belarus	149	Belarus	80	Ukraine	67
6	Armenia	148	Ukraine	80	Russia	66
7	Ukraine	147	Poland	77	Poland	61
8	Poland	138	Serbia	48	Armenia	56
9	Malta	107	Netherlands	44	Italy	49
10	Serbia	92	Italy	37	Portugal	45
11	Italy	86	Albania	32	Serbia	44
12	Macedonia	69	Macedonia	28	Georgia	42
13	Albania	67	Malta	26	Ireland	42
14	Portugal	54	Ireland	12	Macedonia	41
15	Ireland	54	Portugal	9	Cyprus	40
16	Cyprus	45	Cyprus	5	Albania	35

Detailed voting results
Voting procedure used: 100% jury vote 100% online vote		Total score	Jury vote score	Online vote score	Jury vote															
Voting procedure used: 100% jury vote 100% online vote		Total score	Jury vote score	Online vote score	Cyprus	Poland	Netherlands	Armenia	Belarus	Portugal	Ireland	Macedonia	Georgia	Albania	Ukraine	Malta	Russia	Serbia	Australia	Italy
Contestants	Cyprus	45	5	40		2		1			2									
Contestants	Poland	138	77	61	1		10	6	4	5	12	7	2	8	3	6	5	1	6	1
Contestants	Netherlands	156	44	112	5	4		10	6				1		4		4	5		5
Contestants	Armenia	148	92	56	12	10			8	8		2	10	10	10	7	10	2	3	
Contestants	Belarus	149	80	69	6	5	2	7		10	1	5	5	5	2	12	8	4	8	
Contestants	Portugal	54	9	45				2					4							3
Contestants	Ireland	54	12	42						3				3	1		1			4
Contestants	Macedonia	69	28	41		1	3	3	1	1	4			6		5		3	1	
Contestants	Georgia	185	143	42	3	12	7	12	12	7	10	10		12	12	10	12	8	10	6
Contestants	Albania	67	32	35	8						7	3					2		4	8
Contestants	Ukraine	147	80	67	7	6	5	8	5	4	3	6	8	2		4	3	12	7	
Contestants	Malta	107	26	81			6		2			1							5	12
Contestants	Russia	188	122	66	10	8	8	4	10	12	5	12	12	7	5	8		7	12	2
Contestants	Serbia	92	48	44		3	4			2	6	8	3	4	7	2			2	7
Contestants	Australia	172	93	79	2	7	12	5	7	6	8	4	7	1	8	3	7	6		10
Contestants	Italy	86	37	49	4		1		3				6		6	1	6	10		

=== 12 points ===
Below is a summary of all 12 points received from each country's professional juries.

N.	Contestant	Nation(s) giving 12 points
6	Georgia	Albania, Armenia, Belarus, Poland, Russia, Ukraine
4	Russia	Australia, Georgia, Macedonia, Portugal
1	Armenia	Cyprus
1	Australia	Netherlands
1	Belarus	Malta
1	Malta	Italy
1	Poland	Ireland
1	Ukraine	Serbia

== Other countries ==
For a country to be eligible for potential participation in the Junior Eurovision Song Contest, it needs to be an active member of the European Broadcasting Union (EBU). It is currently unknown whether the EBU issue invitations of participation to all 56 active members like they do for the Eurovision Song Contest.

=== Active EBU members ===
- Austria – The Austrian national broadcaster, ORF, announced on 31 May 2017 that they would not debut in the contest in 2017, with no intention to participate for the next few years.
- Bulgaria – On 23 May 2017, the Bulgarian national broadcaster, Bulgarian National Television (BNT), provisionally confirmed their participation in the 2017 contest. However, on 7 June 2017, it was revealed that due to the election of the company's new Director-General, that the broadcaster had withdrawn its application. On 22 September 2017, it was announced that Bulgaria would not participate in the contest.
- Croatia – The Croatian national broadcaster, Hrvatska radiotelevizija (HRT), had confirmed that the broadcaster was looking at the possibility of returning to the contest in 2017. However, Croatia was not on the final list of participants released by the EBU.
- Hungary – On 13 July 2017, Hungarian national broadcaster Médiaszolgáltatás-támogató és Vagyonkezelő Alap (MTVA) stated that they were not ruling out a debut at the 2017 contest. However, on 25 July 2017, MTVA announced that they would not debut in 2017.
- Israel – The Israel Broadcasting Authority (IBA) shut down on 9 May 2017. The new broadcasting network Israeli Public Broadcasting Corporation (IPBC, "KAN") was not a member of the EBU at the time, which was a requirement to participate in the contest. It was revealed on 6 July 2017 that an agreement had been signed between the EBU and IPBC, allowing the broadcaster to participate in EBU contests such as the Junior Eurovision Song Contest, despite not having full membership. Israel was not on the final list of participants released by the EBU, however IPBC still broadcast the contest.

== Broadcasts ==
Broadcasters and commentators in participating countries
Country	Broadcaster(s)	Commentator(s)	Ref.
Albania	TVSH	Andri Xhahu	
Armenia	Armenia 1	Gohar Gasparyan	
Australia	ABC Me	Grace Koh, Pip Rasmussen and Tim Mathews	
Belarus	Belarus 1, Belarus 24	Evgeny Perlin	
Cyprus	RIK 2, RIK Sat	Kyriacos Pastides	
Georgia	First Channel	Demetre Ergemlidze	
Ireland	TG4	Eoghan McDermott	
Italy	Rai Gulp	Laura Carusino and Mario Acampa	
Macedonia	MRT 1	Eli Tanaskovska	
Malta	TVM1	No commentary	
Netherlands	NPO Zapp	Jan Smit	
Poland	TVP2	Artur Orzech	
Portugal	RTP1, RTP Internacional, RTP Africa	Hélder Reis and Nuno Galopim	
Russia	Carousel	Lipa Teterich	
Serbia	RTS2, RTS Satelit	Olga Kapor and Tamara Petković	
Ukraine	UA:Pershyi	Timur Miroshnychenko	

Broadcasters and commentators in non-participating countries
Country	Broadcaster(s)	Commentator(s)	Ref.
Israel	KAN	No commentary	
Kazakhstan	Channel 31	Unknown	
United Kingdom	Radio Six International, Fun Kids, Radio Telstar, Castlepoint FM	Ewan Spence, Lisa-Jayne Lewis	

== See also ==
- ABU International Dance Festival 2017
- Eurovision Choir of the Year 2017
- Eurovision Song Contest 2017
- Eurovision Young Dancers 2017
- Turkvision Song Contest 2017
