= Netherlands in the Junior Eurovision Song Contest 2017 =

2017 Junior Eurovision participation

- Junior Eurovision Song Contest 2017
- Country: Netherlands
- Selection process: Artist: Junior Songfestival 2017; Song: Internal selection
- Selection date: Artist: 16 September 2017; Song: 6 October 2017

Competing entry
- Song: "Love Me"
- Artist: Fource
- Songwriters: Joost Griffioen; Stas Swaczyna

Placement
- Final result: 4th, 156 points

Participation chronology

The Netherlands participated in the Junior Eurovision Song Contest 2017 which took place in Tbilisi, Georgia on 26 November 2017. The Dutch broadcaster AVROTROS is responsible for the organisation of their representative at the contest. Their entry was selected through the national selection Junior Songfestival 2017. It consisted of six contestants who were divided into two semifinals, having been broadcast on 2 & 9 September 2017. The final was broadcast on 16 September 2017. The boy band Fource, a quartet consisting of the four boys Jannes, Niels, Max and Ian, were selected as the winners of the national selection. Their song for the contest, "Love Me", was released on 6 October 2017. Following the contest, Fource remained active as a boyband until they announced their split in 2022.

== Background ==
Prior to the 2017 Contest, the Netherlands had participated in the Junior Eurovision Song Contest fourteen times since its first entry in 2003. The Netherlands have won the contest on one occasion: in 2009 with the song "Click Clack" performed by Ralf Mackenbach. In 2016, the Netherlands placed 8th out of 17 entries with the song "Kisses & Dancin'" performed by the girl band Kisses.

== Before Junior Eurovision ==
=== Junior Songfestival 2017 ===
On 7 June 2017, Dutch broadcaster AVROTROS announced that they would return to the televised process Junior Songfestival after a year of absence, but unlike in previous editions, the song would be selected internally, with contestants singing covers instead of their candidate songs.

The Dutch broadcaster revealed the three jury members on 24 August 2017. The main jury, consisting of Kim-Lian van der Meij (JESC 2007 and 2012 host), Tim Douwsma, and Sharon Doorson selected one qualifier from each semifinal. Additionally, a wildcard jury consisting of Ralf Mackenbach (winner of the Junior Eurovision Song Contest 2009), Mylène & Rosanne (Dutch representatives in the Junior Eurovision Song Contest 2013), and Kisses (Dutch representatives in the Junior Eurovision Song Contest 2016) selected one act eliminated in the semi-finals to progress to the final. All shows of the national final were hosted by Romy Monteiro.

==== Semi-finals ====
The semi-finals were broadcast on 2 and 9 September 2017. The acts picked directly by the jury to qualify to the Junior Songfestival final were Sezina and Fource, with Montana being chosen as the third qualifier by the wildcard jury. In addition to their competition performances, before the results were announced, the participants of the first semi-final performed “Let’s Go” by Ali B, Kenny B and Brace, and the participants of the second semi-final performed “Hart Beat” by Rein van Duivenboden & Vajèn van den Bosch.

Jury qualifier Wildcard qualifier

Semi-final 1 – 2 September 2017
Draw	Artist	Song	Place
1	Montana	"Hold My Hand" (Jess Glynne)	2
2	Dreamz	"Chained to the Rhythm" (Katy Perry)	3
3	Sezina	"Symphony" (Clean Bandit and Zara Larsson)	1

Semi-final 2 – 9 September 2017
Draw	Artist	Song	Place
1	Fource	"There's Nothing Holdin' Me Back" (Shawn Mendes)	1
2	Wieke and Dylan	"A Whole New World" (from Aladdin)	3
3	Manouk	"Say You Won't Let Go" (James Arthur)	2

==== Final ====
The final was broadcast on 16 September 2017. Before the final results were announced, all of the year's contestants reunited to perform "Later als ik groter ben" by BLØF. The final of Junior Songfestival 2017 was the most watched program broadcast on NPO3 of the day, with a total share of 1.3% of viewers, but the show failed to enter the top 25 most viewed programs of the day overall in the Netherlands, falling over 160,000 viewers short of twenty-fifth place. The viewing figures fell from the second semi-final of the competition: in total 28,000 less viewers tuned in to watch the final, with viewing share also reducing by 0.2%. The season was the least watched in the history of Junior Songfestival.

Final – 16 September 2017
Draw	Artist	Song	Place
1	Sezina	"Issues" (Julia Michaels)	2
2	Fource	"September Song" (JP Cooper)	1
3	Montana	"Sign of the Times" (Harry Styles)	3

=== Preparations ===
On 27 September, a 19-second snippet of the song "Love Me" was published, containing the chorus. The official music video and the full song were published on 6 October 2017. The chorus is completely in English while the rest of the song is in Dutch. The filming for the video was done by Framez Productions and took place in several locations around Amsterdam, such as Vondelpark, the Prinsengracht Canal and the Dam Square. The song was composed by Stas Swaczyna & Joost Griffioen, also known as The Rocketeers. Joost Griffioen also wrote the lyrics to the song. The Rocketeers also worked together with Julia on the Dutch Junior Eurovision 2014 entry "Around".

== At Junior Eurovision ==
During the opening ceremony and the running order draw which both took place on 20 November 2017, the Netherlands was drawn to perform in position 3 on 26 November 2017, following Poland and preceding Armenia.

=== Voting ===
In 2017, a new voting system was introduced, in which the results were determined by 50% online voting and 50% jury voting. Every participating broadcaster assembled a national jury that consisted of three music industry professionals and two children aged between 10 and 15 who were citizens of the country they represented. The rankings of those jurors were combined to make an overall top ten.

The online voting consisted of two phases. The first phase of the online voting began on 24 November 2017 when a recap of all the rehearsal performances was shown on the contest's website Junioreurovision.tv before the viewers could vote. After this, voters also had the option to watch longer one-minute clips from each participant's rehearsal. This first round of voting ended on 26 November at 15:59 CET. The second phase of the online voting took place during the live show and began right after the last performance and was open for 15 minutes. International viewers were able to vote for a minimum of three and a maximum of five songs. They were also able to vote for their own country's song. These votes were then turned into points which were determined by the percentage of votes received. For example, if a song received 10% of the votes, it received 10% of the available points.

The Netherlands was ninth after the jury vote with a total of 44 points. The Netherlands however were tops with the online voting with 112 points. They finished fourth overall with a total of 156 points: their best JESC finish since 2011.

Thijs Schlimback, older brother of Fource member Niels Schlimback, was the spokesperson declaring the results of the Dutch jury.

Points awarded to the Netherlands
Score	Country
12 points	
10 points	Armenia
8 points	
7 points	
6 points	Belarus
5 points	Cyprus; Italy; Serbia
4 points	Poland; Russia; Ukraine
3 points	
2 points	
1 point	Georgia
The Netherlands received 112 points from the online vote

Points awarded by the Netherlands
Score	Country
12 points	Australia
10 points	Poland
8 points	Russia
7 points	Georgia
6 points	Malta
5 points	Ukraine
4 points	Serbia
3 points	Macedonia
2 points	Belarus
1 point	Italy

==== Detailed voting results ====
Detailed voting results from the Netherlands
Draw	Country	Juror A	Juror B	Juror C	Juror D	Juror E	Rank	Points
01	Cyprus	14	14	9	14	14	14	
02	Poland	3	3	5	4	4	2	10
03	Netherlands							
04	Armenia	8	10	11	13	11	12	
05	Belarus	6	12	7	6	10	9	2
06	Portugal	12	11	10	12	12	13	
07	Ireland	15	15	13	15	15	15	
08	Macedonia	7	4	14	11	2	8	3
09	Georgia	1	8	3	1	13	4	7
10	Albania	13	6	15	9	9	11	
11	Ukraine	9	5	12	3	6	6	5
12	Malta	5	9	6	5	3	5	6
13	Russia	2	1	2	7	8	3	8
14	Serbia	10	7	4	10	5	7	4
15	Australia	4	2	1	2	1	1	12
16	Italy	11	13	8	8	7	10	1
