= Macedonia in the Junior Eurovision Song Contest 2017 =

- Junior Eurovision Song Contest 2017
- Country: Macedonia
- Selection process: Internal selection
- Announcement date: Artist: 8 September 2017; Song: 8 October 2017

Competing entry
- Song: "Dancing Through Life"
- Artist: Mina Blažev
- Songwriters: Aleksandar Masevski

Placement
- Final result: 12th, 69 points

Participation chronology

Macedonia was represented at the Junior Eurovision Song Contest 2017 which took place on 25 November 2017 in Tbilisi, Georgia. The Macedonian broadcaster MRT was responsible for organising their entry for the contest. Mina Blažev was internally selected on 8 September 2017 as the Macedonian representative and her song for the contest, "Dancing Through Life", was presented on 8 October 2017.

== Background ==
Prior to the 2017 contest, Macedonia had participated in the Junior Eurovision Song Contest twelve times, under the provisional reference of "Former Yugoslav Republic of Macedonia", since its debut at the inaugural contest in 2003. Macedonia were absent twice from the Junior Eurovision Song Contest in 2012 and 2014. They have never won the contest, with their best results being at the 2007 and 2008, represented by the duo Rosica Kulakova and Dimitar Stojmenovski, and Bobi Andonov respectively, achieving fifth place. In the 2016 contest, Martija Stanojković represented her country in Valletta, Malta with the song "Love Will Lead Our Way". The song ended 12th out of 17 entries with 41 points.

== Before Junior Eurovision ==
On 8 September 2017, the Macedonian broadcaster revealed that they had chosen the fourteen-year-old artist Mina Blažev internally to represent the Republic of Macedonia in the Junior Eurovision Song Contest 2017. Her song for the contest, "Dancing Through Life" was revealed on 8 October 2017 along with its official music video. It is written and composed by Aleksander Masevski, who also was responsible for the creation of the Macedonian song for the 2016 contest, "Love Will Lead Our Way", performed by Martija Stanojkovic. The song ended unexpectedly in 12th place out of 17 countries with 41 points despite being a huge favorite to win and due to the removal of the televote for the first time.

== At Junior Eurovision ==
During the opening ceremony and the running order draw which took place on 20 November 2017, Macedonia was drawn to perform eighth on 26 November 2017, following Ireland and preceding Georgia.

=== Voting ===
In 2017, a new voting system was introduced, in which the results were determined by 50% online voting and 50% jury voting. Every participating broadcaster assembled a national jury that consisted of three music industry professionals and two children aged between 10 and 15 who were citizens of the country they represented. The rankings of those jurors were combined to make an overall top ten.

The online voting consisted of two phases. The first phase of the online voting began on 24 November 2017 when a recap of all the rehearsal performances was shown on the contest's website Junioreurovision.tv before the viewers could vote. After this, voters also had the option to watch longer one-minute clips from each participant's rehearsal. This first round of voting ended on 26 November at 15:59 CET. The second phase of the online voting took place during the live show and began right after the last performance and was open for 15 minutes. International viewers were able to vote for a minimum of three and a maximum of five songs. They were also able to vote for their own country's song. These votes were then turned into points which were determined by the percentage of votes received. For example, if a song received 10% of the votes, it received 10% of the available points.

Points awarded to Macedonia
Score	Country
12 points	
10 points	
8 points	
7 points	
6 points	Albania
5 points	Malta
4 points	Ireland
3 points	Armenia; Netherlands; Serbia
2 points	
1 point	Australia; Belarus; Poland; Portugal
Macedonia received 41 points from the online vote

Points awarded by Macedonia
Score	Country
12 points	Russia
10 points	Georgia
8 points	Serbia
7 points	Poland
6 points	Ukraine
5 points	Belarus
4 points	Australia
3 points	Albania
2 points	Armenia
1 point	Malta

==== Detailed voting results ====
The following members comprised the Macedonian jury:

- Martija Stanojković – represented Macedonia in the Junior Eurovision Song Contest 2016
- Petar Kitancev
- Ivana Andonocka Svilar
- Ile Spasov
- Eva Bogoevska

Detailed voting results from Macedonia
Draw	Country	Juror A	Juror B	Juror C	Juror D	Juror E	Rank	Points
01	Cyprus	12	14	11	10	9	14	
02	Poland	3	2	5	15	8	4	7
03	Netherlands	6	13	9	2	14	11	
04	Armenia	14	10	4	8	4	9	2
05	Belarus	4	8	15	6	3	6	5
06	Portugal	7	7	13	14	11	12	
07	Ireland	15	15	14	12	10	15	
08	Macedonia							
09	Georgia	5	6	3	7	2	2	10
10	Albania	11	9	2	11	6	8	3
11	Ukraine	13	3	6	9	5	5	6
12	Malta	10	12	8	1	12	10	1
13	Russia	2	1	1	5	1	1	12
14	Serbia	1	4	10	3	13	3	8
15	Australia	8	11	7	4	7	7	4
16	Italy	9	5	12	13	15	13	
