= Albania in the Junior Eurovision Song Contest 2017 =

- Junior Eurovision Song Contest 2017
- Country: Albania
- Selection process: Junior Fest 2017
- Selection date: 14 October 2017

Competing entry
- Song: "Don't Touch My Tree"
- Artist: Ana Kodra

Placement
- Final result: 13th, 67 points

Participation chronology

Albania was represented at the Junior Eurovision Song Contest 2017 that took place in Tbilisi, Georgia, on 26 November 2017. The Albanian broadcaster RTSH was responsible for the organization of their representative at the contest. Their entry was selected through Junior Fest 2017, a national selection process consisting of sixteen artists who competed to become the Albanian representative on 14 October 2017. Ana Kodra won the selection with the song "Mos ma prekni pemën", meaning "Don't Touch My Tree".

== Background ==
Prior to the 2017 contest, Albania had participated in the Junior Eurovision Song Contest three times since its first entry in 2012, opting not to participate at the 2013 and 2014 contests. Albania has never won the contest, with their best result being in 2015, with the song "Dambaje" performed by Mishela Rapo, achieving fifth place with a score of 93 points. In 2016, Klesta Qehaja represented Albania in Valletta, Malta, with the song "Besoj". The country ended in 13th place out of 17 countries, achieving 38 points.

== Before Junior Eurovision ==
=== Junior Fest 2017 ===
The national final Junior Fest 2017 took place on 14 October 2017. It consisted of sixteen competing acts participating in a televised production where the winner was determined by a jury panel. Sixteen songs took part in Junior Fest 2017, which was held in the Palace of Congresses in Tirana. A three-member professional jury, made up of Fatma Methasani, Andi Bajgora and Lum Veseli, selected Ana Kodra as the winner of the selection with the song "Mos ma prekni pemën". The song was later entitled "Don't Touch My Tree" along with the release of the official video on 14 November 2017.

Draw	Artist	Song	Language
1	Kristiana Veshaj	"Profesioni"	Albanian
2	Amela Agastra	"Dance Up"	Albanian
3	Sara Bajraktari	"Flas me ëndrrën"	Albanian
4	Auron Ismaili	"Shkolla e vjetër"	Albanian
5	Ana Kodra	"Mos ma prekni pemën"	Albanian
6	Valeria Cara	"Kohën pas ta kthej"	Albanian
7	Kleansa Susaj	"Melodi"	Albanian
8	Vivjan Kokeri	"Historia që nuk flet"	Albanian
9	Jana Shala	"Si një melodi"	Albanian
10	Argisa Sako	"Hola"	Albanian, Spanish
11	Diana Tahiri	"Një sekret"	Albanian
12	Alina Jani	"Yjet"	Albanian
13	Uendi Goga	"Të japim ty një shpresë"	Albanian
14	Vivian Biagioni	"Si në përrallë"	Albanian
15	Klaudia & Eliza Thartori	"Garderoba"	Albanian
16	Ajla Buzi	"DJ Pom"	Albanian

== At Junior Eurovision ==
During the opening ceremony and the running order draw which took place on 20 November 2017, Albania was drawn to perform tenth on 26 November 2017, following Georgia and preceding Ukraine.

=== Voting ===
In 2017, a new voting system was introduced, in which the results were determined by 50% online voting and 50% jury voting. Every participating broadcaster assembled a national jury that consisted of three music industry professionals and two children aged between 10 and 15 who were citizens of the country they represented. The rankings of those jurors were combined to make an overall top ten.

The online voting consisted of two phases. The first phase of the online voting began on 24 November 2017 when a recap of all the rehearsal performances was shown on the contest's website Junioreurovision.tv before the viewers could vote. After this, voters also had the option to watch longer one-minute clips from each participant's rehearsal. This first round of voting ended on 26 November at 15:59 CET. The second phase of the online voting took place during the live show and began right after the last performance and was open for 15 minutes. International viewers were able to vote for a minimum of three and a maximum of five songs. They were also able to vote for their own country's song. These votes were then turned into points which were determined by the percentage of votes received. For example, if a song received 10% of the votes, it received 10% of the available points.

Points awarded to Albania
Score	Country
12 points	
10 points	
8 points	Cyprus; Italy
7 points	Ireland
6 points	
5 points	
4 points	Australia
3 points	Macedonia
2 points	Russia
1 point	
Albania received 35 points from the online vote

Points awarded by Albania
Score	Country
12 points	Georgia
10 points	Armenia
8 points	Poland
7 points	Russia
6 points	Macedonia
5 points	Belarus
4 points	Serbia
3 points	Ireland
2 points	Ukraine
1 point	Australia

==== Detailed voting results ====
Detailed voting results from Albania
Draw	Country	Juror A	Juror B	Juror C	Juror D	Juror E	Rank	Points
01	Cyprus	12	13	10	14	12	14	
02	Poland	3	3	2	6	4	3	8
03	Netherlands	13	12	13	3	13	13	
04	Armenia	2	7	3	1	3	2	10
05	Belarus	9	2	12	9	5	6	5
06	Portugal	14	15	15	15	15	15	
07	Ireland	10	14	6	5	8	8	3
08	Macedonia	6	6	8	4	7	5	6
09	Georgia	1	4	1	2	2	1	12
10	Albania							
11	Ukraine	11	5	14	8	6	9	2
12	Malta	15	9	7	7	11	12	
13	Russia	4	1	11	12	1	4	7
14	Serbia	5	10	5	13	10	7	4
15	Australia	8	8	9	11	9	10	1
16	Italy	7	11	4	10	14	11	
