= Poland in the Junior Eurovision Song Contest 2017 =

- Junior Eurovision Song Contest 2017
- Country: Poland
- Selection process: Krajowe Eliminacje do Konkursu Piosenki Eurowizji dla Dzieci 2017
- Selection date: 1 October 2017

Competing entry
- Song: "Mój dom"
- Artist: Alicja Rega
- Songwriters: Marek Kościkiewicz

Placement
- Final result: 8th, 138 points

Participation chronology

Poland was represented at the Junior Eurovision Song Contest 2017 which took place on 26 November 2017 in Tbilisi, Georgia. The Polish broadcaster Telewizja Polska (TVP) was responsible for organising their entry for the contest. A national final, which took place on 1 October 2017, saw ten competing acts participating in a televised production where the winner was determined by a 50/50 combination of votes from a jury made up of music professionals and a public telephone vote. Alicja Rega was chosen as the winner of the selection and she got the right to represent Poland with the song "Mój dom".

== Background ==
Prior to the 2017 contest, Poland has participated in the Junior Eurovision Song Contest three times. In 2003 and 2004, Poland ended in last place and they decided not to participate from 2005 to 2015. The country returned successfully in 2016. Olivia Wieczorek was selected to represent the nation that year with the song "Nie zapomnij". Olivia ended in 11th place out of 17 entries with 60 points.

== Before Junior Eurovision ==
The Polish broadcaster confirmed their participation on 1 August 2017 and opened the submission period for their national selection. They announced that their national selection would take place on 1 October 2017.

=== Krajowe Eliminacje do Konkursu Piosenki Eurowizji dla Dzieci 2017 ===
The national selection Krajowe Eliminacje do Konkursu Piosenki Eurowizji dla Dzieci 2017 took place on 1 October 2017 at studio 5 of TVP in Warsaw. It featured ten competing acts participating in a televised production where the winner was determined by a 50/50 combination of votes from a jury made up of music professionals and a public telephone vote. The show was hosted by Rafał Brzozowski, who placed second in the Polish selection for the Eurovision Song Contest 2017. The show was opened by the last year's representative Olivia Wieczorek, who performed her entry "Nie zapomnij". Olivia also performed with Rafał Brzozowski as a duet and they sang the song "Mam tę moc. Natalia Szroeder and Sylwia Lipka were performing as interval acts during the show. At the end of the show, Alicja Rega was announced as the winner of the selection and she got the right to represent Poland in Tbilisi with her song "Mój dom". Alicja won both the jury and the telephone vote.

Draw	Artist	Song	Place
1	ASMki	"Pod prąd"	—
2	Monika Urbanowicz	"Płomień miłości (Flame of Love)"	—
3	Maya & Marcel	"Tacy sami"	—
4	WAMWAY	"Jesteś mym marzeniem"	—
5	Tomek Bao	"Pochodnie"	—
6	Dominika Ptak	"Anioły"	3
7	Natalia Wawrzyńczyk	"Nie jesteś sam"	—
8	Stanisław Kukulski	"To co żyje w nas"	—
9	Alicja Rega	"Mój dom"	1
10	Urszula Kowalska	"Jestem jaka jestem"	2

== At Junior Eurovision ==
During the opening ceremony and the running order draw which both took place on 20 November 2017, Poland determined their running order position for the final.

=== Voting ===
In 2017, a new voting system was introduced, in which the results were determined by 50% online voting and 50% jury voting. Every participating broadcaster assembled a national jury that consisted of three music industry professionals and two children aged between 10 and 15 who were citizens of the country they represented. The rankings of those jurors were combined to make an overall top ten.

The online voting consisted of two phases. The first phase of the online voting began on 24 November 2017 when a recap of all the rehearsal performances was shown on the contest's website Junioreurovision.tv before the viewers could vote. After this, voters also had the option to watch longer one-minute clips from each participant's rehearsal. This first round of voting ended on 26 November at 15:59 CET. The second phase of the online voting took place during the live show and began right after the last performance and was open for 15 minutes. International viewers were able vote for a minimum of three and a maximum of five songs. They were also able to vote for their own country's song. These votes were then turned into points which were determined by the percentage of votes received. For example, if a song received 10% of the votes, it received 10% of the available points.

Points awarded to Poland
Score	Country
12 points	Ireland
10 points	Netherlands
8 points	Albania
7 points	Macedonia
6 points	Armenia; Australia; Malta
5 points	Portugal; Russia
4 points	Belarus
3 points	Ukraine
2 points	Georgia
1 point	Cyprus; Italy; Serbia
Poland received 61 points from the online vote

Points awarded by Poland
Score	Country
12 points	Georgia
10 points	Armenia
8 points	Russia
7 points	Australia
6 points	Ukraine
5 points	Belarus
4 points	Netherlands
3 points	Serbia
2 points	Cyprus
1 point	Macedonia

==== Detailed voting results ====
Detailed voting results from Poland
Draw	Country	Juror A	Juror B	Juror C	Juror D	Juror E	Rank	Points
01	Cyprus	11	11	8	9	8	9	2
02	Poland							
03	Netherlands	8	10	9	7	9	7	4
04	Armenia	1	2	1	10	2	2	10
05	Belarus	5	5	14	4	3	6	5
06	Portugal	13	9	12	14	10	13	
07	Ireland	9	15	7	15	15	15	
08	Macedonia	12	7	13	6	12	10	1
09	Georgia	3	1	2	3	4	1	12
10	Albania	10	13	11	11	6	11	
11	Ukraine	7	3	3	5	7	5	6
12	Malta	15	14	4	12	11	12	
13	Russia	2	4	10	1	1	3	8
14	Serbia	14	6	5	8	13	8	3
15	Australia	4	8	6	2	5	4	7
16	Italy	6	12	15	13	14	14	
