= Ukraine in the Junior Eurovision Song Contest 2017 =

- Junior Eurovision Song Contest 2017
- Country: Ukraine
- Selection process: National final
- Selection date: Semi-final: 8 August 2017; Final: 25 August 2017

Competing entry
- Song: "Don't Stop"
- Artist: Anastasiya Baginska
- Songwriters: Anastasiya Baginska, Kateryna Komar

Placement
- Final result: 7th, 147 points

Participation chronology

Ukraine was represented at the Junior Eurovision Song Contest 2017 which will be held in Tbilisi, Georgia on 26 November 2017. Their entrant was selected through a national selection, organized by the Ukrainian broadcaster NTU. The semi-final took place on 8 August 2017, where the 27 eligible submissions performed in front of a jury, and then they chose ten artists to qualify to the final, which took place on 25 August 2017. As a result, Anastasiya Baginska won the Ukrainian selection and got the right to represent Ukraine in Tbilisi, Georgia with the song "Don't Stop (Ne zupyniay)".

== Background ==
Prior to the 2017 Contest, Ukraine had participated in the Junior Eurovision Song Contest eleven times since its debut in 2006. Ukraine have never missed a contest since their debut appearance, having won the contest once in 2012 with the song "Nebo", performed by Anastasiya Petryk. The Ukrainian capital Kyiv has hosted the contest twice, at the Palace of Sports in 2009 and at the Palace "Ukraine" in 2013. In 2016, Sofia Rol represented Ukraine in Valletta, Malta with the song "Planet Craves For Love". It ended 14th out of 17 competing countries with 30 points.

== Before Junior Eurovision ==
=== National final ===
The Ukrainian broadcaster launched their selection process on 7 July 2017, accepting submissions until 7 August 2017. A semi-final took place on 8 August 2017, with all the submissions performing in front of a professional jury consisting of Sofia Rol, Svitlana Tarabarova, Valentyn Koval, Rozhden and Viktor Knysh, who decided the 10 acts that qualified for the final. It was announced shortly after the semi-final that the final would take place on 25 August 2017.

==== Final ====
The final, hosted by Timur Miroshnychenko and Daria Kolomiiets, took place on 25 August 2017 in the International Children's Centre in Artek, based in Pushcha-Vodytsia. It consisted of 10 competing acts participating in a televised production where the winner was determined by a 50/50 combination of both telephone vote and the votes of a jury made up of music professionals. The show was opened by the 2016 Ukrainian representative Sofia Rol who performed her song "Planet Craves For Love". The jury, responsible for delivering 50% of the final result, consisted of: Vadym Lysytsia (music, sound producer), Iryna Shvaidak (singer), EL Kravchuk (singer, actor), Svitlana Tarabarova (singer, composer), Rozhden (singer, musician). Eventually, Anastasiya Baginska was announced as the winner of the national final and earned the right to represent Ukraine in Tbilisi, Georgia with the song "Ne zupyniay". The public televote in the final registered 14,731 votes in total.

Final – 25 August 2017
Draw	Artist	Song	Jury	Televote		Total	Place
Draw	Artist	Song	Jury	Votes	Points	Total	Place
1	Veronika Kovalenko	"In My Dream"	8	598	5	13	5
2	Pollianna Ryzhak	"On Your Way"	3	113	1	4	10
3	Duet "Hlamurchyk"	"De ty i ya" (Де ти і я)	4	2,407	9	13	3
4	Sofia Lozina	"Ya viryu" (Я вірю)	7	355	3	10	7
5	Sofia Bondarenko	"Muzyka dushi" (Музика душі)	10	284	2	12	6
6	Anastasiya Baginska	"Ne zupyniay" (Не зупиняй)	9	6,038	10	19	1
7	Fedir Sklyarenko	"Davay, spivay!" (Давай, співай!)	2	686	6	8	9
8	Daryna Halitska	"Yanholy" (Янголи)	8	2,256	8	16	2
9	Sofia Shkidchenko	"Yo De Ley" (Йо Де Лей)	5	403	4	9	8
10	Nina Boykova	"Dream is Near"	6	1,591	7	13	4

== At Junior Eurovision ==
During the opening ceremony and the running order draw which will both take place on 20 November 2017, Ukraine was drawn to perform eleventh on 26 November 2017, following Albania and preceding Malta.

In Ukraine, the final was broadcast on UA:Pershyi with commentary by Timur Miroshnychenko. The Ukrainian spokesperson, who announced the top 12-point score awarded by the Ukrainian jury during the final, was 2016 Ukrainian representative Sofia Rol.

=== Voting ===
In 2017, a new voting system was introduced, in which the results were determined by 50% online voting and 50% jury voting. Every participating broadcaster assembled a national jury that consisted of three music industry professionals and two children aged between 10 and 15 who were citizens of the country they represented. The rankings of those jurors were combined to make an overall top ten.

The online voting consisted of two phases. The first phase of the online voting began on 24 November 2017 when a recap of all the rehearsal performances was shown on the contest's website Junioreurovision.tv before the viewers could vote. After this, voters also had the option to watch longer one-minute clips from each participant's rehearsal. This first round of voting ended on 26 November at 15:59 CET. The second phase of the online voting took place during the live show and began right after the last performance and was open for 15 minutes. International viewers were able to vote for a minimum of three and a maximum of five songs. They were also able to vote for their own country's song. These votes were then turned into points which were determined by the percentage of votes received. For example, if a song received 10% of the votes, it received 10% of the available points.

Points awarded to Ukraine
Score	Country
12 points	Serbia
10 points	
8 points	Armenia; Georgia
7 points	Australia; Cyprus
6 points	Macedonia; Poland
5 points	Belarus; Netherlands
4 points	Malta; Portugal
3 points	Ireland; Russia
2 points	Albania
1 point	
Ukraine received 67 points from the online vote

Points awarded by Ukraine
Score	Country
12 points	Georgia
10 points	Armenia
8 points	Australia
7 points	Serbia
6 points	Italy
5 points	Russia
4 points	Netherlands
3 points	Poland
2 points	Belarus
1 point	Ireland

==== Detailed voting results ====
The following members comprised the Ukrainian jury:

- Arsen Mirzoyan
- Anastasia Prikhodko – represented Russia in the Eurovision Song Contest 2009
- Anna Hurhan
- two unidentified participants of the Ukrainian national final for the contest

Detailed voting results from Ukraine
Draw	Country	Juror A	Juror B	Juror C	Juror D	Juror E	Rank	Points
01	Cyprus	15	15	13	11	11	14	
02	Poland	13	6	9	5	7	8	3
03	Netherlands	5	5	7	8	12	7	4
04	Armenia	1	2	5	7	5	2	10
05	Belarus	14	11	14	1	1	9	2
06	Portugal	12	14	12	15	15	15	
07	Ireland	4	7	10	12	14	10	1
08	Macedonia	11	10	8	9	10	11	
09	Georgia	2	1	2	3	3	1	12
10	Albania	7	12	6	14	13	12	
11	Ukraine							
12	Malta	10	13	11	13	6	13	
13	Russia	8	9	15	2	2	6	5
14	Serbia	3	4	3	6	8	4	7
15	Australia	9	3	4	4	4	3	8
16	Italy	6	8	1	10	9	5	6
