= Kota Banks =

Australian singer-songwriter and musician

- Also known as: Kota Banks
- Born: Jessica Mimi Porfiri; 13 October 1994 (age 32); Sydney, New South Wales, Australia
- Origin: Italy
- Genre: Pop
- Occupations: Singer-songwriter; musician
- Instrument: Vocals
- Years active: 2005–present
- Labels: NLV; Astralwerks; Capitol

Jessica Mimi Porfiri (born 13 October 1994), who performs as Kota Banks, is an Australian pop singer-songwriter and musician. She signed to Nina Las Vegas's label, NLV Records, in May 2017, which released Banks' ten-track extended play, Prize (styled as PRIZE), as a mix tape in mid-2018. Banks has co-written songs for fellow Australian artists. She supported What So Not on his national tour. By November 2017, her music had accumulated over 20 million plays on Spotify.

== Early life ==
Kota Banks was born in 1994 in Sydney, Australia, as Jessica Mimi Porfiri, in Sydney. She spent her late childhood and teens in Florence. Banks has been singing since the age of 9. She returned to Sydney.

== Personal life ==
Banks is a Christian. She prays every time she writes music. In an article with The Daily Telegraph, she said:

"I just feel like it [praying] gives me more depth to my songwriting and opens my mind."

== Career ==
Banks' debut single, "N.F.F.A.", was issued in 2016 and was co-written by Banks with Lee Chew (or Toby Chew-Lee) and Cameron Nacson. It was produced by the duo as MOZA. Troy Mutton of Pile Rats described how she, "dabbles in some seriously fun electronic-pop", and described her single as a "bold track both production-wise and lyrically, catchy as and slotting right alongside artists such as Nicole Millar, Jess Kent and Danish artist MØ."

Her second single, "Holiday", appeared in 2017, which was co-written with Danny Omerhodic, who produced the track for NLV Records, as Swick. "Empty Streets" featuring MOZA, was her next single in that year, which was also co-written with Chew and Nacson. For the Junior Eurovision Song Contest of 2017, Banks, Chew and Nacson, with Chloe Papandrea, co-wrote Australia's entry, "Speak Up". It was performed by Isabella Clarke in Tbilisi, where Clarke finished third.

For the FOMO Festival in Adelaide, Banks joined Nina Las Vegas (a.k.a. Nina Agzarian) on-stage to perform "Holiday" in January 2018. The pair co-wrote "Alibrandi" with Omerhodic, which Las Vegas performs using Banks on vocals. In March her single, "Zoom", was premiered on Triple J's Good Nights and subsequently received high rotation on the national youth radio station. Triple J's Al Newstead declared, "this [track] has grown on us hard. It's a fun, flirty mix of dancehall and pop elevated by the fanciful production."

Banks released her debut extended play, Prize (styled as PRIZE), in mid-2018, as a ten-track mix tape. It was produced by Omerhodic, who shared the song writing with Banks on most of its tracks. AltMedia's Jamie Apps rated it at three-and-a-half stars and explained, "[she] is not just a one hit wonder though as throughout the remainder of the record Banks carries the momentum forward as she celebrate feminine strength and empowerment." Following the release of PRIZE, Banks announced her debut national headline tour, selling out her hometown show.

From July 2019, Banks began releasing her music under Sony Music Entertainment Australia. From 2019, she shares her life through TikTok and tries to get more attention through extended play (EP).

== Discography ==
=== Mixtapes ===
List of mixtapes, with release date and label shown
Title	Details
Prize (Note: Prize is stylized in all caps.)	Released: 29 June 2018; Label: NLV Records; Formats: Digital download, streaming

=== Extended plays ===
List of EPs, with release date and label shown
Title	Details
Sweet and the Spice	Released: 31 July 2020; Label: Sony Music Australia; Formats: Digital download, streaming

=== Singles ===
==== As lead artist ====
List of singles as lead artist, with year released and album shown
Title	Year	Album
"N.F.F.A"	2016	Non-album singles
"Holiday"	2017	Non-album singles
"Empty Streets" (featuring MOZA)	2017	Non-album singles
"Zoom"	2018	Non-album singles
"Fiorentina" (featuring Capo Lee)	2018	Prize
"Child"	2018	Prize
"I'm It"	2018	Prize
"20 Missed Calls"	2019	Non-album singles
"Big Bucks"	2019	Non-album singles
"Feel Again"	2019	Non-album singles
"Italiana" (standard or acoustic version)	2020	Non-album singles
"Snip Snip" (prod. by Swick)	2020	Sweet and the Spice
"Let U Leave"	2020	Sweet and the Spice
"Never Sleep"	2020	Sweet and the Spice
"Yes"	2020	Sweet and the Spice
"Mutual XO"	2022	

==== As featured artist ====
List of singles as featured artist, with year released and album shown
Title	Year	Album
"Don't Look Down" (Pez featuring Kota Banks)	2016	Don't Look Down
"Decisions" (Swick featuring Kota Banks)	2018	Non-album single

=== Music videos ===
List of music videos, with year released and director shown
Title	Year	Director
"Zoom"	2018	Ella Carey
