= Italy in the Junior Eurovision Song Contest 2017 =

- Junior Eurovision Song Contest 2017
- Country: Italy
- Selection process: Internal Selection
- Selection date: 4 October 2017

Competing entry
- Song: "Scelgo (My Choice)"
- Artist: Maria Iside Fiore
- Songwriters: Stefano Rigamonti; Fabrizio Palaferri; Marco Iardella; Maria Iside Fiore

Placement
- Final result: 11th, 86 points

Participation chronology

Italy was represented at the Junior Eurovision Song Contest 2017 which took place on 26 November 2016 in Tbilisi, Georgia. The Italian broadcaster Rai Gulp, which is a channel owned by Radiotelevisione Italiana (RAI), was responsible for organising their entry for the contest. Maria Iside Fiore was internally selected to represent Italy with the song "Scelgo (My Choice)".

== Background ==
Prior to the 2017 Contest, Italy had participated in the Junior Eurovision Song Contest three times since its debut in 2014, having won the contest on their first appearance with the song "Tu primo grande amore", performed by Vincenzo Cantiello.

== Before Junior Eurovision ==
The Italian broadcaster announced on 26 June 2017, that they would be participating at the contest which takes place on 26 November 2017, in Tbilisi, Georgia. The method for selecting their entrant and song was done internally by the national broadcaster, RAI. On 4 October 2017, it was announced that Maria Iside Fiore would be representing Italy at the contest with the song "Scelgo (My Choice)".

== At Junior Eurovision ==
During the opening ceremony and the running order draw which took place on 20 November 2017, Italy was drawn to perform sixteenth (last) on 26 November 2017, following Australia.

=== Voting ===
In 2017, a new voting system was introduced, in which the results were determined by 50% online voting and 50% jury voting. Every participating broadcaster assembled a national jury that consisted of three music industry professionals and two children aged between 10 and 15 who were citizens of the country they represented. The rankings of those jurors were combined to make an overall top ten.

The online voting consisted of two phases. The first phase of the online voting began on 24 November 2017 when a recap of all the rehearsal performances was shown on the contest's website Junioreurovision.tv before the viewers could vote. After this, voters also had the option to watch longer one-minute clips from each participant's rehearsal. This first round of voting ended on 26 November at 15:59 CET. The second phase of the online voting took place during the live show and began right after the last performance and was open for 15 minutes. International viewers were able to vote for a minimum of three and a maximum of five songs. They were also able to vote for their own country's song. These votes were then turned into points which were determined by the percentage of votes received. For example, if a song received 10% of the votes, it received 10% of the available points.

Points awarded to Italy
Score	Country
12 points	
10 points	Serbia
8 points	
7 points	
6 points	Georgia; Russia; Ukraine
5 points	
4 points	Cyprus
3 points	Belarus
2 points	
1 point	Malta; Netherlands
Italy received 49 points from the online vote

Points awarded by Italy
Score	Country
12 points	Malta
10 points	Australia
8 points	Albania
7 points	Serbia
6 points	Georgia
5 points	Netherlands
4 points	Ireland
3 points	Portugal
2 points	Russia
1 point	Poland

==== Detailed voting results ====
Detailed voting results from Italy
Draw	Country	Juror A	Juror B	Juror C	Juror D	Juror E	Rank	Points
01	Cyprus	15	5	9	8	13	12	
02	Poland	7	13	12	12	2	10	1
03	Netherlands	11	6	6	3	7	6	5
04	Armenia	12	10	7	10	8	11	
05	Belarus	14	11	10	9	15	14	
06	Portugal	8	8	4	7	12	8	3
07	Ireland	5	9	5	6	9	7	4
08	Macedonia	13	14	8	13	10	13	
09	Georgia	6	4	15	4	4	5	6
10	Albania	2	12	2	11	1	3	8
11	Ukraine	10	15	14	14	11	15	
12	Malta	1	1	1	2	6	1	12
13	Russia	4	7	11	15	5	9	2
14	Serbia	9	2	3	1	14	4	7
15	Australia	3	3	13	5	3	2	10
16	Italy							
