= Malta in the Junior Eurovision Song Contest 2017 =

- Junior Eurovision Song Contest 2017
- Country: Malta
- Selection process: Artist: Malta Junior Eurovision Song Contest 2017; Song: Internal selection
- Selection date: Artist: 1 July 2017; Song: 29 September 2017

Competing entry
- Song: "Dawra tond"
- Artist: Gianluca Cilia
- Songwriters: Dominic Cini; Emil Calleja Bayliss

Placement
- Final result: 9th, 107 points

Participation chronology

Malta was represented at the Junior Eurovision Song Contest 2017 on 26 November 2017 in Tbilisi, Georgia. The Maltese entrant for the 2017 contest was selected through a national final, organised by the Maltese broadcaster Public Broadcasting Services (PBS) on 1 July 2017, while their song was selected internally. Each of the ten participants performed covers of non-Eurovision candidate songs during the national final. Gianluca Cilia was declared winner with his cover of Perdere l'amore.

== Background ==
Prior to the 2017 contest, Malta had participated in the Junior Eurovision Song Contest twelve times since its first entry in 2003 only opting not to participate at the 2011 and 2012 contests. Malta has won on two occasions: in 2013 when Gaia Cauchi won with the song "The Start", and again in 2015 when Destiny Chukunyere came first with "Not My Soul" when it won the contest with 185 points, breaking the previous record held by Spain for the most points ever given to a winner.

== Before Junior Eurovision ==
=== Malta Junior Eurovision Song Contest 2017 ===
The national final took place on 1 July 2017. The national final consisted of ten competing acts participating in a televised production. Each of the 10 participants sang a song of their own choice. After all of them had performed, the results were decided through televoting, and 9-year-old Gianluca Cilia was announced as the winner of the national final.

Final – 1 July 2017
Draw	Artist	Song	Place
1	Thea Aquilina	"It's Man's Man's World" (Renée Geyer)	—
2	Jahel Cardona	"One Night Only" (Dreamgirls)	—
3	Gianluca Cilia	"Perdere l'amore" (Massimo Rainieri)	1
4	Kira Copperstone	"The Voice Within" (Christina Aguilera)	—
5	Riona Degiorgio	"True Colors" (Cyndi Lauper)	—
6	Rianne Demicoli	"Satellite" (Lena Meyer-Landrut)	3
7	Aidan Jay Drakard	"Mad World" (Tears for Fears)	—
8	Demi Galea	"Breathing Underwater" (Emeli Sandé)	—
9	Kylie Meilak	"I Believe" (Fantasia)	—
10	Veronica Rotin	"And I Am Telling You" (Jennifer Holliday)	2

=== Song selection ===
On 30 September 2017 the Maltese broadcaster Public Broadcasting Services (PBS) announced that Gianluca Cilia will sing "Dawra Tond" (English: Round in a Circle) at the Junior Eurovision Song Contest 2017.

== At Junior Eurovision ==
During the opening ceremony and the running order draw which took place on 20 November 2017, Malta was drawn to perform twelfth on 26 November 2017, following Ukraine and preceding Russia.

=== Voting ===
In 2017, a new voting system was introduced, in which the results were determined by 50% online voting and 50% jury voting. Every participating broadcaster assembled a national jury that consisted of three music industry professionals and two children aged between 10 and 15 who were citizens of the country they represented. The rankings of those jurors were combined to make an overall top ten.

The online voting consisted of two phases. The first phase of the online voting began on 24 November 2017 when a recap of all the rehearsal performances was shown on the contest's website Junioreurovision.tv before the viewers could vote. After this, voters also had the option to watch longer one-minute clips from each participant's rehearsal. This first round of voting ended on 26 November at 15:59 CET. The second phase of the online voting took place during the live show and began right after the last performance and was open for 15 minutes. International viewers were able to vote for a minimum of three and a maximum of five songs. They were also able to vote for their own country's song. These votes were then turned into points which were determined by the percentage of votes received. For example, if a song received 10% of the votes, it received 10% of the available points.

Points awarded to Malta
Score	Country
12 points	Italy
10 points	
8 points	
7 points	
6 points	Netherlands
5 points	Australia
4 points	
3 points	
2 points	Belarus
1 point	Macedonia
Malta received 81 points from the online vote

Points awarded by Malta
Score	Country
12 points	Belarus
10 points	Georgia
8 points	Russia
7 points	Armenia
6 points	Poland
5 points	Macedonia
4 points	Ukraine
3 points	Australia
2 points	Serbia
1 point	Italy

==== Detailed voting results ====
Detailed voting results from Malta
Draw	Country	Juror A	Juror B	Juror C	Juror D	Juror E	Rank	Points
01	Cyprus	15	12	10	11	9	13	
02	Poland	10	5	5	5	8	5	6
03	Netherlands	6	14	12	12	7	11	
04	Armenia	2	8	9	4	3	4	7
05	Belarus	1	1	1	3	2	1	12
06	Portugal	11	13	11	13	14	14	
07	Ireland	14	15	15	15	12	15	
08	Macedonia	7	4	4	8	10	6	5
09	Georgia	3	3	3	1	4	2	10
10	Albania	13	7	14	9	13	12	
11	Ukraine	4	6	13	10	5	7	4
12	Malta							
13	Russia	5	2	6	2	1	3	8
14	Serbia	12	9	2	7	15	9	2
15	Australia	9	11	7	6	11	8	3
16	Italy	8	10	8	14	6	10	1
