= Polina Bogusevich =

Russian singer (born 2003)

Polina Bogusevich Полина Богусевич
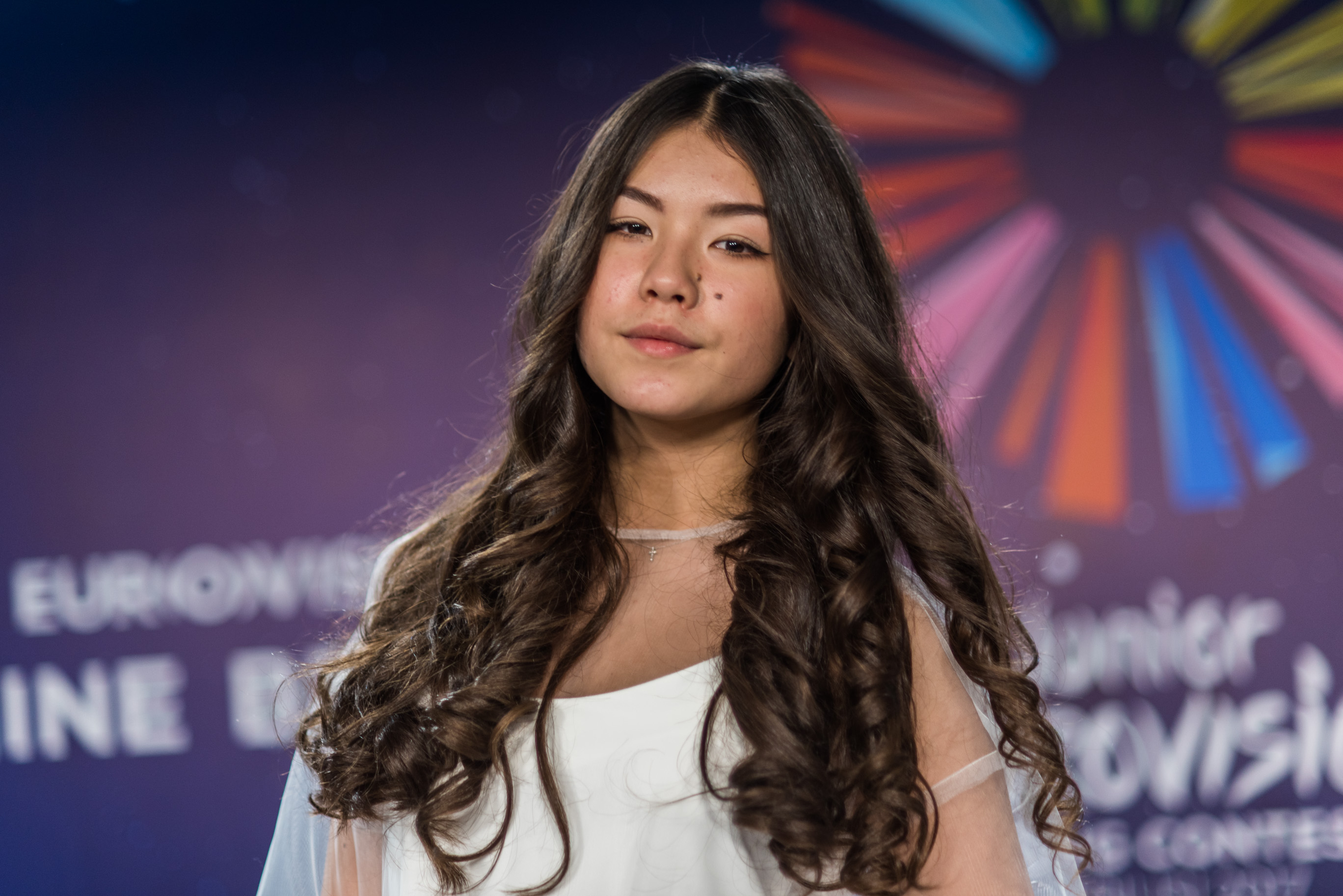
- Bogusevich at the Junior Eurovision Song Contest 2017

Background information
- Also known as: Nanamé
- Born: Polina Sergeyevna Bogusevich; 4 July 2003 (age 23); Moscow, Russia
- Genres: Pop
- Occupation: Singer
- Instrument: Vocals
- Years active: 2012–present

Polina Sergeyevna Bogusevich (Russian: Полина Сергеевна Богусевич; born 4 July 2003) is a Russian singer. She represented Russia in the Junior Eurovision Song Contest 2017 with the song "Wings", and went on to win the competition. She is the second Russian entrant to win the Junior Eurovision Song Contest.

She previously competed in season onе of The Voice Kids Russia, where she progressed to the battle rounds.

== Life and career ==
=== Early life and career ===
Bogusevich was born in Moscow on 4 July 2003 to parents Yulia and Sergey Bogusevich. She is of mixed Russian and Korean ancestry, while her family originates in Omsk. Bogusevich is a student at the Academy of Popular Music. She began her professional singing career in 2012, while taking part in an international arts festival in North Macedonia, and later appeared on the television programs Okno v Parizh and Shkola muzyki.

=== 2014–present: Golos deti, New Wave Junior, and Junior Eurovision ===
In 2014, Bogusevich was selected to compete in season one of Golos deti. After her blind audition, she joined Team Dima Bilan. She progressed to the battle rounds, where she was eliminated from the competition. Following Golos deti, Bogusevich took part in New Wave Junior 2014, as one of the two Russian representatives. She went on to place second in the competition.

In April 2017, Bogusevich was confirmed to be taking part in the Russian national selection for the Junior Eurovision Song Contest 2017 with the song "Krylya". She later went on to win the national selection, and was awarded the right to represent Russia in the Junior Eurovision Song Contest 2017 in Tbilisi. The song was later given an English language title for Junior Eurovision, "Wings". At the final on 26 November 2017, Bogusevich was declared the winner of the competition, becoming only the second Russian entrant to win and the first since the Tolmachevy Sisters won the Junior Eurovision Song Contest 2006.

Bogusevich has since moved to Los Angeles, California.

== Discography ==
Title	Year	Album
"Krylya" / "Wings"	2017	Non-album single
"Heavy On My Heart”	2018	Non-album single
"Ya ne odin"	2018	Non-album single

Awards and achievements
Preceded by Water of Life Project with "Water of Life"	Russia in the Junior Eurovision Song Contest; 2017	Succeeded by Anna Filipchuk with "Unbreakable"
Preceded by (Georgia (country)) Mariam Mamadashvili with "Mzeo"	Winner of the Junior Eurovision Song Contest; 2017	Succeeded by (Poland) Roksana Węgiel with "Anyone I Want to Be"
