= Australia in the Junior Eurovision Song Contest 2017 =

- Junior Eurovision Song Contest 2017
- Participating broadcaster: Australian Broadcasting Corporation (ABC)
- Country: Australia
- Selection process: Internal selection
- Announcement date: Artist: 10 September 2017; Song: 7 October 2017

Competing entry
- Song: "Speak Up!"
- Artist: Isabella Clarke
- Songwriters: Cam Nacson; Chloe Papandrea; Jess Porfiri; Toby Chew Lee

Placement
- Final result: 3rd, 172 points

Participation chronology

Australia was represented at the Junior Eurovision Song Contest 2017 with the song "Speak Up!", written by Cam Nacson, Chloe Papandrea, Jess Porfiri, and Toby Chew Lee, and performed by Isabella Clarke. The Australian participating broadcaster, the Australian Broadcasting Corporation (ABC), internally selected its entry for the contest. Isabella Clarke was announced on 10 September 2017, and the song was revealed on 7 October.

== Background ==
Prior to the 2017 contest, the Special Broadcasting Service (SBS) had participated in the Junior Eurovision Song Contest representing Australia twice since its debut in 2015, with the song "My Girls" performed by Bella Paige. In 2016, Alexa Curtis represented Australia with the song "We Are", achieving fifth place. In 2017, the Australian Broadcasting Corporation (ABC) replaced SBS as the Australian participating broadcaster.

== Before Junior Eurovision ==
On 10 September 2017, ABC announced that it had internally selected Isabella Clarke as its representative for the Junior Eurovision Song Contest 2017. She started singing when she was nine. The prior two years she had performed at The Victorian State Schools Spectacular in Australia. Clarke's song "Speak Up" was revealed on 7 October 2017.

== At Junior Eurovision ==
During the opening ceremony and the running order draw which took place on 20 November 2017, Australia was drawn to perform fifteenth on 26 November 2017, following Serbia and preceding Italy.

=== Voting ===
In 2017, a new voting system was introduced, in which the results were determined by 50% online voting and 50% jury voting. Every participating broadcaster assembled a national jury that consisted of three music industry professionals and two children aged between 10 and 15 who were citizens of the country they represented. The rankings of those jurors were combined to make an overall top ten.

The online voting consisted of two phases. The first phase of the online voting began on 24 November 2017 when a recap of all the rehearsal performances was shown on the contest's website Junioreurovision.tv before the viewers could vote. After this, voters also had the option to watch longer one-minute clips from each participant's rehearsal. This first round of voting ended on 26 November at 15:59 CET. The second phase of the online voting took place during the live show and began right after the last performance and was open for 15 minutes. International viewers were able to vote for a minimum of three and a maximum of five songs. They were also able to vote for their own country's song. These votes were then turned into points which were determined by the percentage of votes received. For example, if a song received 10% of the votes, it received 10% of the available points.

Points awarded to Australia
Score	Country
12 points	Netherlands
10 points	Italy
8 points	Ireland; Ukraine
7 points	Belarus; Georgia; Poland; Russia
6 points	Portugal; Serbia
5 points	Armenia
4 points	Macedonia
3 points	Malta
2 points	Cyprus
1 point	Albania
Australia received 79 points from the online vote

Points awarded by Australia
Score	Country
12 points	Russia
10 points	Georgia
8 points	Belarus
7 points	Ukraine
6 points	Poland
5 points	Malta
4 points	Albania
3 points	Armenia
2 points	Serbia
1 point	Macedonia

==== Detailed voting results ====
Detailed voting results from Australia
Draw	Country	Juror A	Juror B	Juror C	Juror D	Juror E	Rank	Points
01	Cyprus	15	15	15	11	12	15	
02	Poland	5	6	8	3	6	5	6
03	Netherlands	11	14	7	13	9	12	
04	Armenia	2	9	13	9	5	8	3
05	Belarus	9	2	2	4	7	3	8
06	Portugal	14	13	3	7	13	11	
07	Ireland	10	12	14	15	15	14	
08	Macedonia	12	3	1	14	11	10	1
09	Georgia	1	4	9	2	4	2	10
10	Albania	7	5	5	10	10	7	4
11	Ukraine	6	10	6	5	1	4	7
12	Malta	3	7	12	8	3	6	5
13	Russia	4	1	4	1	2	1	12
14	Serbia	8	8	10	6	8	9	2
15	Australia							
16	Italy	13	11	11	12	14	13	
