= Vlad Sokolovsky =

Russian singer (born 1991)

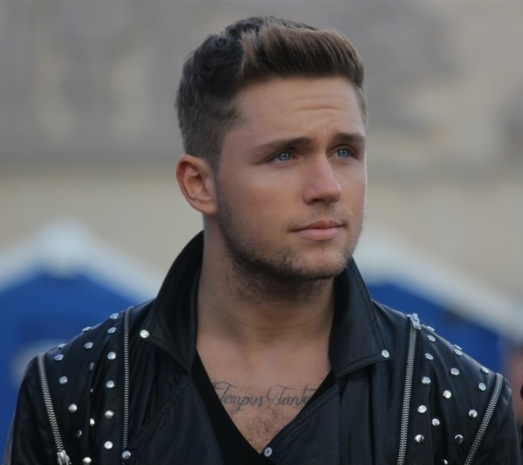
Vlad Sokolovsky

Vlad Sokolovsky (real name- Vsevolod Andreyevich Sokolovsky, born 24 September 1991, Moscow) is a Russian singer, songwriter, producer, dancer, and TV host. In the past, he performed as a dancer in Todes ballet and as a singer in the duo BiS. He is currently a solo singer working in R&B/euro-pop eclectic style.

== Biography ==
Sokolovsky was born on 24 September 1991 into an artistic family. His father, Andrey Aleksandrovich Sokolovski, was a choreographer, founder, and soloist of the vocal-and-dance group "X-Mission". His mother, Irina Vsevolodovna (née) Serbina-Herz, was a circus performer who did tightrope dancing and stage director. He has a sister, Daria Serbina. In June 2015 Vlad married Margarita Gerasimovich, performing under the stage name Rita Dakota. In October 2017 their daughter Mia was born. They divorced in August 2018.

He appeared in the seventh season of ice show contest Ice Age.

== Early music career ==
He started performing at the age of 3 in a video clip with Filip Kirkorov "Zayka moya" (My Bunny). In 1996 he started studying dance at the Art School and continued at studio Todes. In 2001 he recorded his first big hit "Red-haired Up". In 2002 and 2004 he performed in the music and circus show Peter Pan based on the J. M. Barrie story. In 2004 he plays in the musical "Holiday of Disobedience" based on S. Mikhalkov's story. During this whole time he also occasionally performed with a band X-Mission as a singer. In 2006, after the departure of a singer, Vlad joined X-Mission as a full-time singer. Sokolovskiy and fellow BiS singer Dmitriy Bikbaev participated in the seventh season of Fabrika Zvyozd and came in third place.

== Personal life ==
Between 2008 and 2011 Vlad was dating Daria Garnizova (a daughter of the composer Alexey Garnizov), who was a member of "Todes" ballet at that time. Between June, 2015 and September, 2018, Vlad was married to Margarita Gerasimovich (a.k.a. Rita Dakota). The two met at the "Star Factory-7" TV show. They have a daughter, Miya, who was born on October 23, 2017. On October 25, 2021 Vlad reported in his Instagram page, that he and Angelina Surkova are expecting a baby. In February 2022 the artist reported, that his son named David was born. The parents got married on March 3, 2022.

== Filmography ==
- Univer. New Dorm (2011-2018)
- The Telki (2022)
- The Challenge (2023)
