= Serbia in the Junior Eurovision Song Contest 2017 =

- Junior Eurovision Song Contest 2017
- Country: Serbia
- Selection process: Dečja pesma za Evropu
- Selection date: 28 September 2017

Competing entry
- Song: "Ceo svet je naš"
- Artist: Irina Brodić and Jana Paunović
- Songwriters: Ognjen Cvekić; Lejla Hot; Irina Brodić; Jana Paunović

Placement
- Final result: 10th, 92 points

Participation chronology

Serbia was represented at the Junior Eurovision Song Contest 2017 which took place on 26 November 2017, in Tbilisi, Georgia. Radio Television of Serbia (RTS) was responsible for organising their entry for the contest. Irina Brodić and Jana Paunović were selected from national selection to represent Serbia with the song "Ceo svet je naš".

== Background ==
Prior to the 2017 Contest, Serbia had participated in the Junior Eurovision Song Contest eight times since its debut in 2006, and once as Serbia and Montenegro in 2005, prior to the Montenegrin independence referendum in 2006 which culminated into the dissolution of Serbia and Montenegro. The Serbian broadcaster announced on 15 June 2017, that they would be participating at the contest to be held in Tbilisi, Georgia.

== Before Junior Eurovision ==
=== Dečja pesma za Evropu 2017 ===
The singer who performed the Serbian entry for the Junior Eurovision Song Contest 2017 was selected through the national final Dečja pesma za Evropu. On 15 June 2017, RTS revealed it would revert to an open selection to choose their entry after several years of closed internal selections. On 21 September 2017, it was announced that a national final would take place to determine the country's representative.

Interested candidates had to submit their entries before the deadline on 15 August. A total of 18 songs were submitted to RTS which were then shortlisted to three by a panel of music editors.

==== Final ====
The final was recorded on 28 September 2017 and broadcast on 30 September 2017 on 12:30 CET. The winners were Jana Paunović (born 7 February 2005) and Irina Brodić (born 3 November 2004) with the song "Ceo svet je naš", which was selected from the five-panel jury, who consisted of Vojkan Borisavljević (arranger and producer), Nevena Božović (singer, represented Serbia in the 2007 contest), Ljiljana Ranđelović (choir conductor), Čeda Hodžić (RTS music editor) and Kiki Lesendrić (rock musician).

Final – 30 September 2017
Draw	Artist	Song	Songwriter(s)	V. Borisavljević	N. Božović	L. Ranđelović	Č. Hodžić	K. Lesendrić	Total	Place
1	Darija Vračević	"Ove zvezde smo ti i ja" (Ове звезде смо ти и ја)	Dušan Alagić, Leontina Vukomanović, Darija Vračević	10	8	8	8	12	46	3
2	Irina Brodić and Jana Paunović	"Ceo svet je naš" (Цео свет је наш)	Ognjen Cvekić, Lejla Hot, Irina Brodić, Jana Paunović	12	10	12	12	10	56	1
3	Irina Arsenijević	"Šta je svet bez ljubavi" (Шта је свет без љубави)	Marina Adamov Stojadinović, Irina Arsenijević, Boban Dževerdanović	8	12	10	10	8	48	2

== At Junior Eurovision ==
During the opening ceremony and the running order draw which took place on 20 November 2017, Serbia was drawn to perform fourteenth on 26 November 2017, following Russia and preceding Australia.

=== Voting ===
In 2017, a new voting system was introduced, in which the results were determined by 50% online voting and 50% jury voting. Every participating broadcaster assembled a national jury that consisted of three music industry professionals and two children aged between 10 and 15 who were citizens of the country they represented. The rankings of those jurors were combined to make an overall top ten.

The online voting consisted of two phases. The first phase of the online voting began on 24 November 2017 when a recap of all the rehearsal performances was shown on the contest's website Junioreurovision.tv before the viewers could vote. After this, voters also had the option to watch longer one-minute clips from each participant's rehearsal. This first round of voting ended on 26 November at 15:59 CET. The second phase of the online voting took place during the live show and began right after the last performance and was open for 15 minutes. International viewers were able to vote for a minimum of three and a maximum of five songs. They were also able to vote for their own country's song. These votes were then turned into points which were determined by the percentage of votes received. For example, if a song received 10% of the votes, it received 10% of the available points.

Points awarded to Serbia
Score	Country
12 points	
10 points	
8 points	Macedonia
7 points	Italy; Ukraine
6 points	Ireland
5 points	
4 points	Albania; Netherlands
3 points	Georgia; Poland
2 points	Australia; Malta; Portugal
1 point	
Serbia received 44 points from the online vote

Points awarded by Serbia
Score	Country
12 points	Ukraine
10 points	Italy
8 points	Georgia
7 points	Russia
6 points	Australia
5 points	Netherlands
4 points	Belarus
3 points	Macedonia
2 points	Armenia
1 point	Poland

==== Detailed voting results ====
Detailed voting results from Serbia
Draw	Country	Juror A	Juror B	Juror C	Juror D	Juror E	Rank	Points
01	Cyprus	14	13	13	13	15	15	
02	Poland	10	5	7	9	13	10	1
03	Netherlands	8	10	8	7	4	6	5
04	Armenia	11	6	9	11	6	9	2
05	Belarus	6	4	2	12	14	7	4
06	Portugal	15	15	12	5	5	12	
07	Ireland	13	12	14	14	12	13	
08	Macedonia	9	8	6	10	9	8	3
09	Georgia	5	3	4	4	3	3	8
10	Albania	12	14	15	15	11	14	
11	Ukraine	2	2	1	2	2	1	12
12	Malta	4	11	11	8	10	11	
13	Russia	3	1	5	6	8	4	7
14	Serbia							
15	Australia	7	9	10	3	1	5	6
16	Italy	1	7	3	1	7	2	10
