= Russia in the Junior Eurovision Song Contest 2017 =

- Junior Eurovision Song Contest 2017
- Country: Russia
- Selection process: National final
- Selection date: 3 June 2017

Competing entry
- Song: "Wings"
- Artist: Polina Bogusevich
- Songwriters: Taras Demchuk

Placement
- Final result: 1st, 188 points

Participation chronology

Russia won the Junior Eurovision Song Contest 2017 which took take place on 26 November 2017, in Tbilisi, Georgia. The Russian broadcaster Russia-1, owned by the All-Russia State Television and Radio Broadcasting Company (VGTRK) was responsible for organising their entry for the contest. Polina Bogusevich won the contest with the song "Wings".

== Background ==
Prior to the 2017 Contest, Russia had participated in the Junior Eurovision Song Contest twelve times since its debut in 2005. Russia have participated at every contest since its debut, and have won the contest once in 2006 with the song "Vesenniy Jazz", performed by Tolmachevy Twins. The twin sisters went on to become the first act from a Junior Eurovision Song Contest to represent their country at the Eurovision Song Contest, performing the song "Shine" at the Eurovision Song Contest 2014, in Copenhagen, Denmark.

== Before Junior Eurovision ==
=== National final ===
The Russian broadcaster, Russia-1, announced on 23 December 2016 that they would be participating at the 2017 Contest, taking place in Tbilisi, Georgia, on 26 November 2017. At the time of the announcement, it was also stated that the national final would take place at the children's camp Artek, located on the Crimean Peninsula. Submissions for entrants were open between 30 May to 15 July. A list of nineteen competing entrants was revealed on 17 May 2017, while on 28 May their songs were released with two new added entrants.

==== Final ====
The final was recorded on 3 June, while it aired on Carousel the next day. The national selection final to select the entrant for Russia at the Junior Eurovision Song Contest 2017, were determined by a voting split of 50% jury members and 50% internet voting. The jury consisted of: Igor Krutoy (artist), Grigory Gladkov (musician), Yevgeny Krylatov (composer), Dina Garipova (singer), Evgeny Kombarov (general director of the Children's Radio), Lerika (Junior Eurovision participant in 2011 and 2012) and Tatyana Tsyvareva (director of the Karusel TV channel). 13-year-old Polina Bogusevich won the final with the song "Krylya". Bogusevich had previously competed in season one of Golos deti. Later that year, she went on to represent Russia in New Wave Junior 2014, where she placed second.

Final – 3 June 2017
Draw	Artist	Song	Bonus	Jury	Online Vote		Total	Place
Draw	Artist	Song	Bonus	Jury	Votes	Points	Total	Place
1	Polina Terekhova	"Puls planety" (Пульс планеты)	12	6	3.1%	0	18	18
2	Arseniy Kulikov	"Gadzhety" (Гаджеты)	12	7	3.4%	0	19	14
3	Glafira Leukhina	"Momenty" (Моменты)	12	6	0.8%	0	18	16
4	Kinder Star	"Pizhama pati" (Пижама пати)	12	6	6.8%	2	20	11
5	Vilena Khikmatullina	"Gravitatsiya" (Гравитация)	12	10	8.2%	5	27	3
6	Ulyana Ovchinnikova	"Davay uletim" (Давай улетим)	12	5	1.3%	0	17	19
7	Egor Ermolayev	"Para" (Пара)	12	3	9.4%	10	25	5
8	Vladlena Gubareva	"Vorona" (Ворона)	12	8	1.7%	0	20	12
9	Papaya	"Vyshe" (Выше)	12	5	0.3%	0	17	20
10	Veronika Ustimova	"Ya by khotela vse uznat" (Я бы хотела всё узнать)	12	7	9.3%	8	27	2
11	Ksenia Neznamova	"Oblaka" (Облака)	12	6	7.1%	4	22	8
12	Kirill Yesin	"Yarkiye tantsy" (Яркие танцы)	12	6	9.0%	7	25	4
13	Elvira Kirsanova	"Mechta" (Мечта)	12	3	2.9%	0	15	21
14	Anastasia Gladilina	"Pover" (Поверь)	12	4	8.5%	6	22	7
15	Ochechi	"Vykhodnoy" (Выходной)	12	10	7.0%	3	25	6
16	Yulia Kondrashenko	"Moya muzyka" (Моя музыка)	12	10	0.3%	0	22	9
17	Anna Chernotalova	"Eta muzyka" (Эта музыка)	12	5	5.3%	1	18	17
18	Emoji	"Vremya ne zhdet" (Время не ждёт)	12	7	1.5%	0	19	13
19	Polina Bogusevich	"Krylya" (Крылья)	12	12	9.6%	12	36	1
20	Kudri	"Kudri" (Кудри)	12	9	0.5%	0	21	10
21	Viktoria Bezdomnikova	"Provokatsiya" (Провокация)	12	7	4.2%	0	19	15

== At Junior Eurovision ==
During the opening ceremony and the running order draw which took place on 20 November 2017, Russia was drawn to perform thirteenth on 26 November 2017, following Malta and preceding Serbia.

=== Voting ===
In 2017, a new voting system was introduced, in which the results were determined by 50% online voting and 50% jury voting. Every participating broadcaster assembled a national jury that consisted of three music industry professionals and two children aged between 10 and 15 who were citizens of the country they represented. The rankings of those jurors were combined to make an overall top ten.

The online voting consisted of two phases. The first phase of the online voting began on 24 November 2017 when a recap of all the rehearsal performances was shown on the contest's website Junioreurovision.tv before the viewers could vote. After this, voters also had the option to watch longer one-minute clips from each participant's rehearsal. This first round of voting ended on 26 November at 15:59 CET. The second phase of the online voting took place during the live show and began right after the last performance and was open for 15 minutes. International viewers were able to vote for a minimum of three and a maximum of five songs. They were also able to vote for their own country's song. These votes were then turned into points which were determined by the percentage of votes received. For example, if a song received 10% of the votes, it received 10% of the available points.

Points awarded to Russia
Score	Country
12 points	Australia; Georgia; Macedonia; Portugal
10 points	Belarus; Cyprus
8 points	Malta; Netherlands; Poland
7 points	Albania; Serbia
6 points	
5 points	Ireland; Ukraine
4 points	Armenia
3 points	
2 points	Italy
1 point	
Russia received 66 points from the online vote

Points awarded by Russia
Score	Country
12 points	Georgia
10 points	Armenia
8 points	Belarus
7 points	Australia
6 points	Italy
5 points	Poland
4 points	Netherlands
3 points	Ukraine
2 points	Albania
1 point	Ireland

==== Detailed voting results ====
Detailed voting results from Russia
Draw	Country	Juror A	Juror B	Juror C	Juror D	Juror E	Rank	Points
01	Cyprus	10	7	13	13	15	12	
02	Poland	11	11	6	5	4	6	5
03	Netherlands	4	12	11	4	9	7	4
04	Armenia	2	2	2	2	2	2	10
05	Belarus	3	3	10	3	3	3	8
06	Portugal	14	13	12	12	10	13	
07	Ireland	5	5	7	14	14	10	1
08	Macedonia	12	6	8	11	13	11	
09	Georgia	1	1	1	1	1	1	12
10	Albania	9	10	9	8	7	9	2
11	Ukraine	8	9	4	7	12	8	3
12	Malta	13	14	14	15	11	15	
13	Russia							
14	Serbia	15	15	15	10	8	14	
15	Australia	7	4	3	6	5	4	7
16	Italy	6	8	5	9	6	5	6
