= Rita Dakota =

Belarusian singer-songwriter (born 1990)

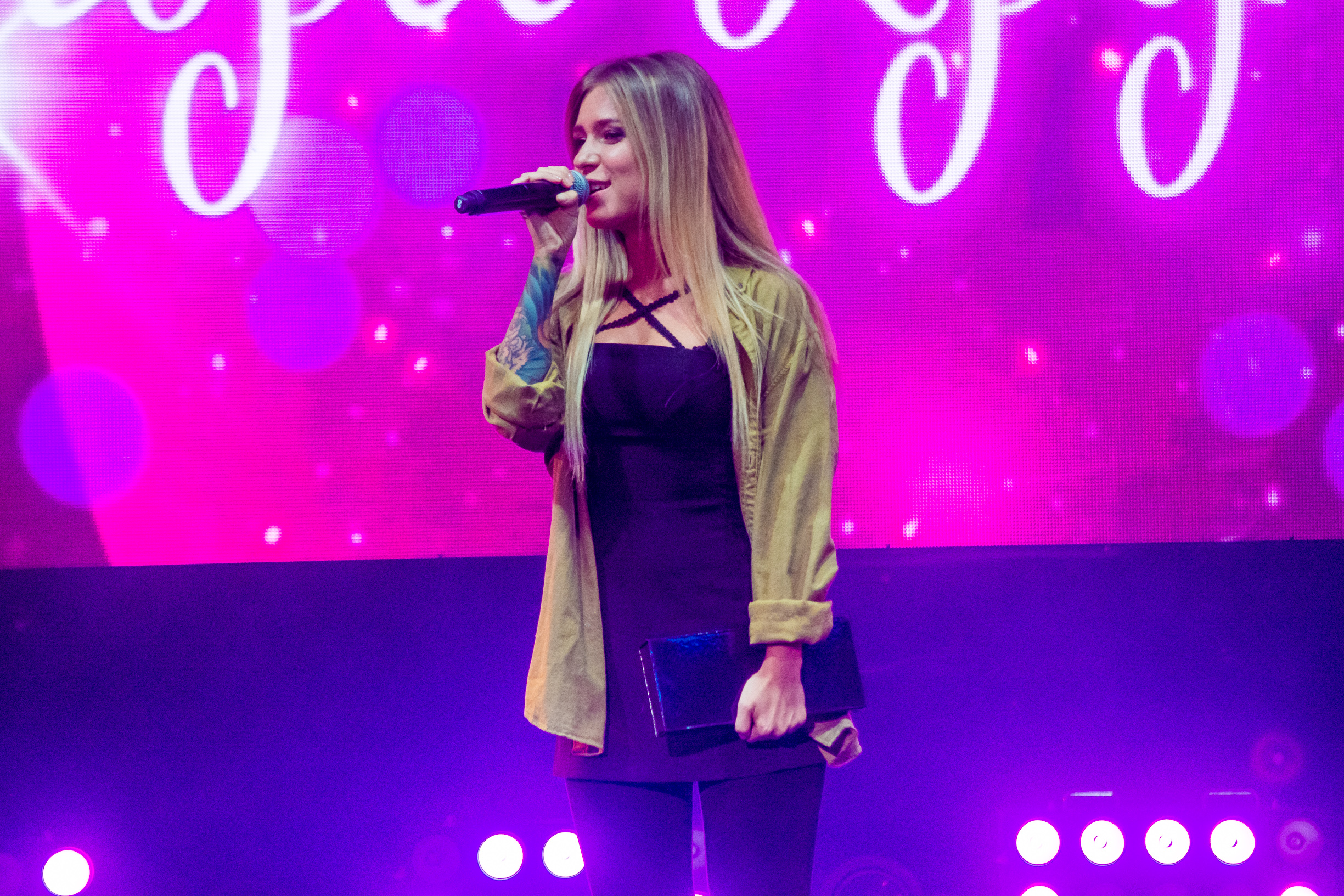
- Dakota in 2017

Background information
- Born: Margarita Sergeevna Gerasimovich; March 9, 1990 (age 36); Minsk, Belarus
- Instrument: Piano
- Formerly of: Monroe
- Spouse(s): Vlad Sokolovsky (m. 2015, div. 2018); Fedor Belogai (m. 2020)
- Website: https://ritadakota-concert.ru/

Margarita Sergeevna Gerasimovich (Russian: Маргарита Сергеевна Герасимович, Belarusian: Маргарыта Сяргееўна Герасімовіч; born 9 March 1990), better known by her stage name Rita Dakota (Russian: Рита Дакота), is a Belarusian rock singer-songwriter.

== Biography ==
Dakota was born in 1990 in Minsk, Belarus. She grew up in the Komarovka district in Minsk. She attended the Gerasimov Institute of Cinematography in Moscow, Russia.

Dakota participated in television talent competitions, such as the Russian show Fabrika Zvyozd (Star Factory).

Dakota became a member of the rock band Monroe, before starting a solo career. The band played at the Kubana and Invasion festivals.

Dakota writes her own songs and her debut solo album was released in 2020. Her lyrics have covered her life experiences including a difficult childhood "with syringes and bottles" due to her alcoholic father, the domestic abuse suffered by her mother, and her own postpartum depression and divorce.

In 2023, Dakota travelled to live in the United States and was subsequently banned from performing in Russia.

== Personal life ==
Dakota married Russian dancer and singer Vlad Sokolovsky in June 2015 and they divorced in August 2018. She married musician Fedor Belogai in 2020.
