= List of Junior Eurovision Song Contest winners =

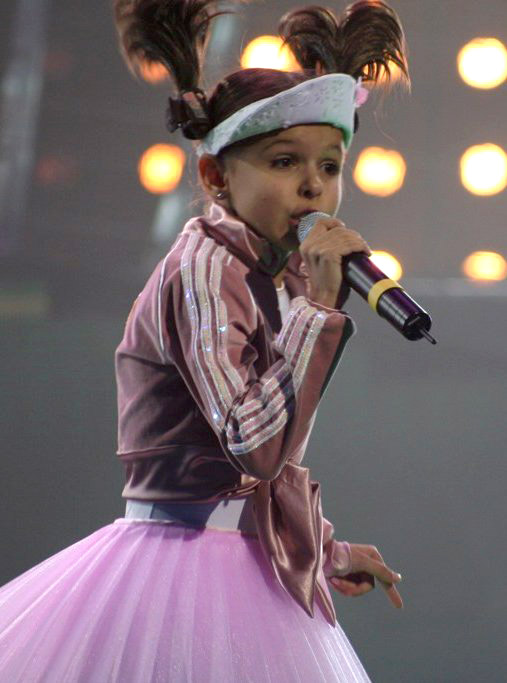
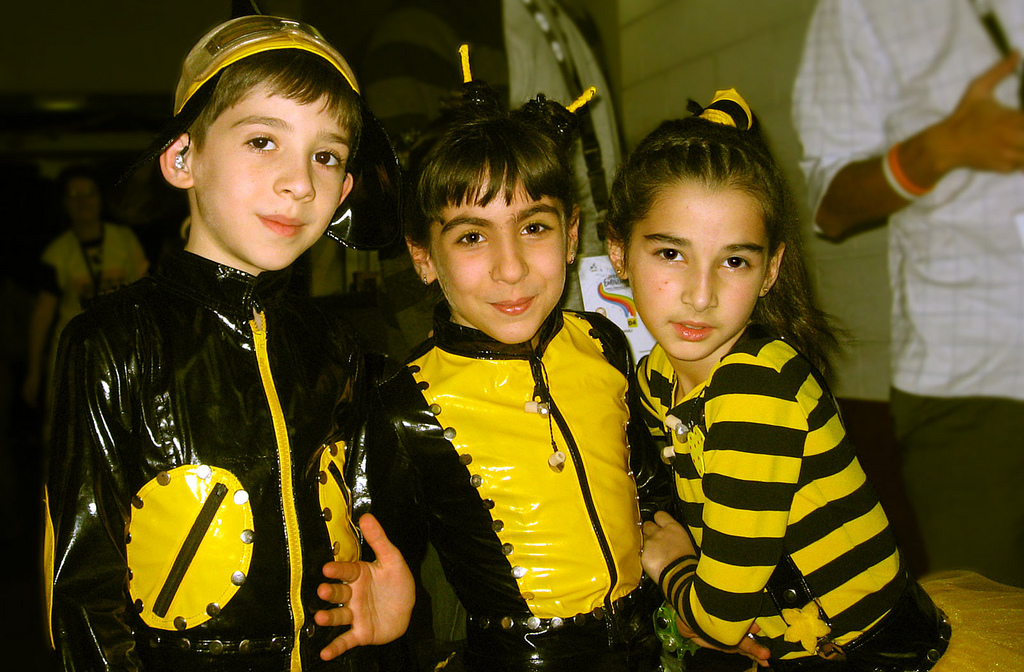
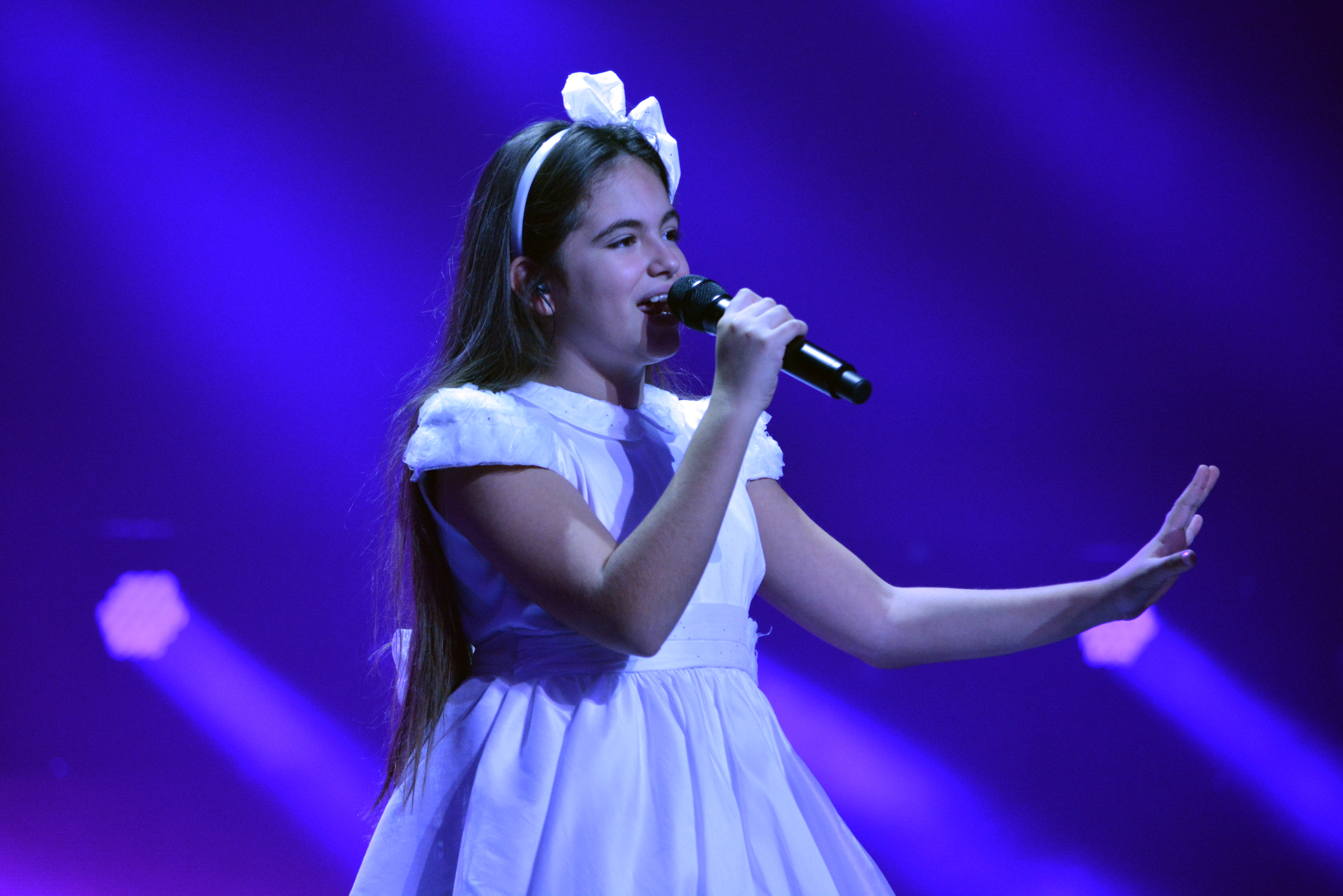
Left: Ksenia Sitnik, winner of the 2005 contest for Belarus. Centre: Bzikebi, winner of the 2008 contest for Georgia. Right: Gaia Cauchi, winner of the 2013 contest for Malta.

The Junior Eurovision Song Contest is an annual contest organised annually by the European Broadcasting Union (EBU) for children aged between 9 and 14 (8 and 15 between 2003 and 2006, 10 and 15 between 2007 and 2015). The contest has been broadcast every year since its inception in 2003, and is based on the Eurovision Song Contest, one of the longest-running television programmes in the world. The contest's winner has been determined using numerous voting techniques throughout its history; centre to these have been points awarded through jury voting or public voting. The song awarded the most points is declared the winner.

As of 2026, twenty-four contests have been held, with one winner each. Twelve countries have won the Junior Eurovision Song Contest. The countries with the highest number of wins are Georgia and France with four wins each. Armenia has won the contest 3 times. Four countries have won the contest twice: Belarus, Malta, Poland (first country to win two years in a row and the first country to win on home soil), and Russia, and five have won the contest once: Croatia, Italy, the Netherlands, Spain, and Ukraine. Both Croatia and Italy achieved their wins on their debut participation in the contest. The first repeat winner was Belarus, which occurred in 2007, while the first country to win three times was Georgia, which occurred in 2016. North Macedonia is the country with the longest history in the contest without a win, having made eighteen appearances since their debut in the inaugural contest in 2003.

Winning the Junior Eurovision Song Contest provides an opportunity for the winning artist(s) to capitalize on their success and surrounding publicity by launching or furthering their career. Some artists from Junior Eurovision have progressed later in their careers to participate in national finals for the Eurovision Song Contest or the main event proper, including Molly Sandén, Nevena Božović, the Tolmachevy Sisters, Lisa, Amy and Shelley (later known as Ogene), Stefania Liberakakis, Destiny Chukunyere, Iru Khechanovi, and Bzikebi.

Unlike the Eurovision Song Contest, the winning broadcaster of the previous year's Junior Eurovision Song Contest does not automatically receive the right to host the next edition, and until 2012 it was not tradition for it to host the next edition of the contest. This has been applied through since 2013, with only the 2015, 2018, and 2024 editions being held in a different country than the previous winner. Before 2012, with the exception of the first two years (2003 and 2004), the countries would bid for the privilege to host the next year's Junior Eurovision.

== Winners by year ==
Winners of the Junior Eurovision Song Contest
Year	Country	Song	Artist	Songwriter(s)	Language
2003	Croatia	"Ti si moja prva ljubav"	Dino Jelusić	Dino Jelusić	Croatian
2004	Spain	"Antes muerta que sencilla"	María Isabel	María Isabel	Spanish
2005	Belarus	"My vmeste" (Мы вместе)	Ksenia Sitnik	Ksenia Sitnik	Russian
2006	Russia	"Vesenniy jazz" (Весенний джаз)	Tolmachevy Sisters	Anastasiya Tolmacheva; Maria Tolmacheva	Russian
2007	Belarus	"S druz'yami" (С друзьями)	Alexey Zhigalkovich	Alexey Zhigalkovich	Russian
2008	Georgia	"Bzz.."	Bzikebi	Mariam Kikuashvili; Mariam Talulashvili; Giorgi Shiolashvili	None
2009	Netherlands	"Click Clack"	Ralf Mackenbach	Ralf Mackenbach	Dutch, English
2010	Armenia	"Mama" (Մամա)	Vladimir Arzumanyan	Vladimir Arzumanyan	Armenian
2011	Georgia	"Candy Music"	Candy	Mariam Gvaladze; Ana Khanchalyan; Irina Khechanovi; Irina Kovalenko; Giorgi Kukhiadnidze; Gvantsa Saneblidze	Georgian
2012	Ukraine	"Nebo" (Небо)	Anastasiya Petryk	Anastasiya Petryk	Ukrainian, English
2013	Malta	"The Start"	Gaia Cauchi	Gillian Attard; Gaia Cauchi; Matthew Mercieca; Elton Zarb	English
2014	Italy	"Tu primo grande amore"	Vincenzo Cantiello	Fabrizio Berlincioni; Vincenzo Cantiello; Leonardo de Amicis; Francesca Giuliano; Alterisio Paoletti	Italian, English
2015	Malta	"Not My Soul"	Destiny Chukunyere	Destiny Chukunyere; Matthew Mercieca; Elton Zarb	English
2016	Georgia	"Mzeo" (მზეო)	Mariam Mamadashvili	Maka Davitaia; Giorgi Kukhianidze	Georgian
2017	Russia	"Wings"	Polina Bogusevich	Taras Demchuk	Russian, English
2018	Poland	"Anyone I Want to Be"	Roksana Węgiel	Maegan Cottone; Nathan Duvall; Mich Hedin Hansen; Peter Wallevik; Daniel Davidsen; Małgorzata Uściłowska; Patryk Kumór	Polish, English
2019	Poland	"Superhero"	Viki Gabor	Dominic Buczkowski-Wojtaszek; Patryk Kumór; Małgorzata Uściłowska	Polish, English
2020	France	"J'imagine"	Valentina	Igit; Barbara Pravi	French
2021	Armenia	"Qami Qami" (Քամի Քամի)	Maléna	Vahram Petrosyan; Tokionine; Arpine Martoyan; David Tserunyan	Armenian, English
2022	France	"Oh Maman !"	Lissandro	Frédéric Chateau; Barbara Pravi	French
2023	France	"Cœur"	Zoé Clauzure	Julien Comblat; Jérémy Chapron; Noée Francheteau	French
2024	Georgia	"To My Mom"	Andria Putkaradze	Maka Davitaia; Giorgi Kukhianidze	Georgian
2025	France	"Ce monde"	Lou Deleuze	John Claes; Jonathan Thyssens; Pauline Thisse	French
2026	Armenia	"Boo!"	Naré	Grigor Kyokchyan; Lilit Navasardyan	Armenian, English

== Winners by country ==
Map showing each country's number of Junior Eurovision Song Contest wins (by colour) as of 2026

Table key
†	Inactive – countries which participated in the past but did not appear in the most recent contest, or will not appear in the upcoming contest
◇	Ineligible – countries whose broadcasters are no longer part of the EBU and are therefore ineligible to participate

Junior Eurovision Song Contest wins by country
Wins	Country	Years
4	Georgia	2008; 2011; 2016; 2024
4	France	2020; 2022; 2023; 2025
3	Armenia	2010; 2021; 2026
2
2	Belarus	2005; 2007
2	Malta	2013; 2015
2	Russia	2006; 2017
2	Poland	2018; 2019
1	Croatia	2003
1	Spain	2004
1	Netherlands	2009
1	Ukraine	2012
1	Italy	2014

== Performers and songwriters with multiple wins ==
The following individuals have won the Junior Eurovision Song Contest as a performer or songwriter more than once.

Individuals with multiple Junior Eurovision Song Contest wins
Wins	Name	Wins as performer	Wins as songwriter
3	Giorgi Kukhianidze	—N/a	2011; 2016; 2024
2	Barbara Pravi	—N/a	2020; 2022
2	Maka Davitaia	—N/a	2016; 2024
2	Małgorzata Uściłowska	—N/a	2018; 2019
2	Patryk Kumór	—N/a	2018; 2019

== Winners by language ==
Since the contest began in 2003, all competing entries must be performed in an official, national or regional language of the country they are representing. Between 2003 and 2007, the songs could only be performed exclusively in a national language, however, they could also have a few lines in another language. Then, between 2008 and 2016, at least 75% of the lyrics of each song had to be in a national language, with no restrictions on the language of the remaining part of the lyrics; this was changed to at least 60% in 2017, which has been the obligation ever since.

Junior Eurovision Song Contest wins by language
Wins	Language	Years	Countries
10	English	2009 (Note: Partially sung in Dutch.); 2012 (Note: Partially sung in Ukrainian.); 2013; 2014 (Note: Partially sung in Italian.); 2015; 2017 (Note: Partially sung in Russian.); 2018 (Note: Partially sung in Polish.); 2019; 2021 (Note: Partially sung in Armenian.); 2026	Netherlands; Ukraine; Malta; Italy; Russia; Poland; Armenia
4	Russian	2005; 2006; 2007; 2017 (Note: Partially sung in English.)	Belarus; Russia
4	French	2020; 2022; 2023; 2025	France
3	Georgian	2011; 2016; 2024	Georgia
3	Armenian	2010; 2021; 2026	Armenia
2	Polish	2018; 2019	Poland
1	Croatian	2003	Croatia
1	Spanish	2004	Spain
1	None	2008	Georgia
1	Dutch	2009	Netherlands
1	Ukrainian	2012	Ukraine
1	Italian	2014	Italy

== Gallery ==
=== Performers ===
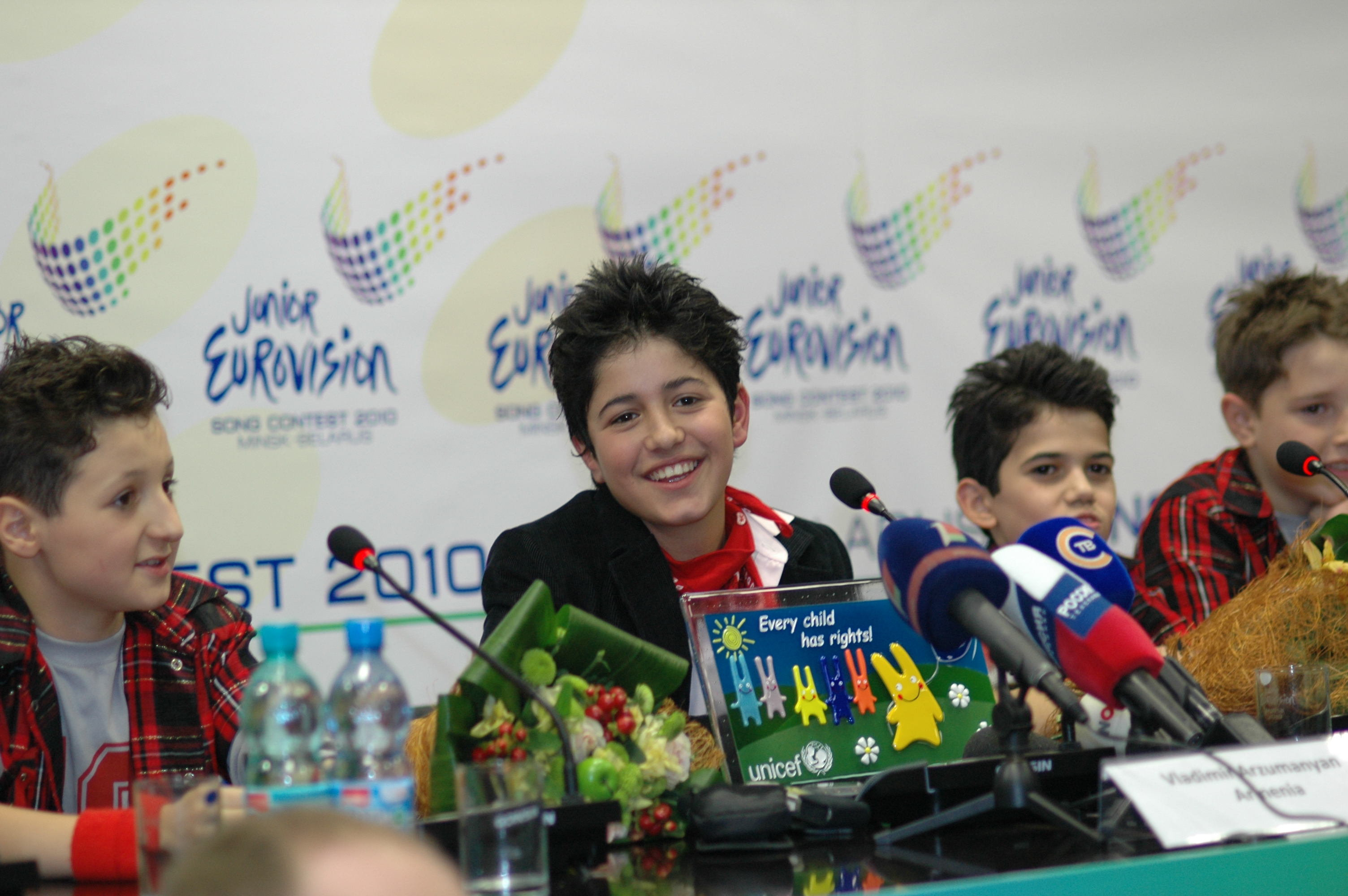
Vladimir Arzumanyan, winner of the 2010 contest for Armenia.

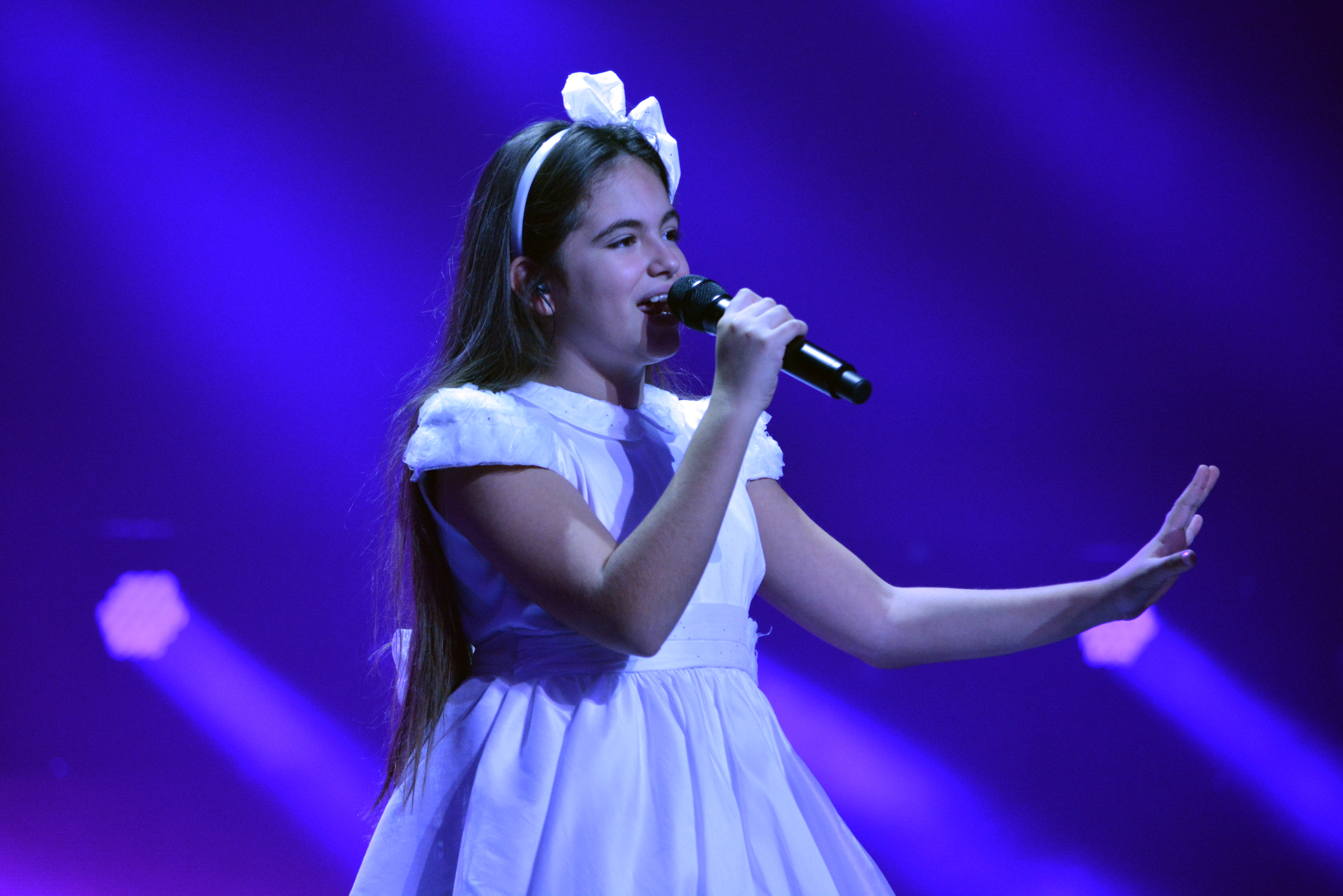
Gaia Cauchi, winner of the 2013 contest for Malta.

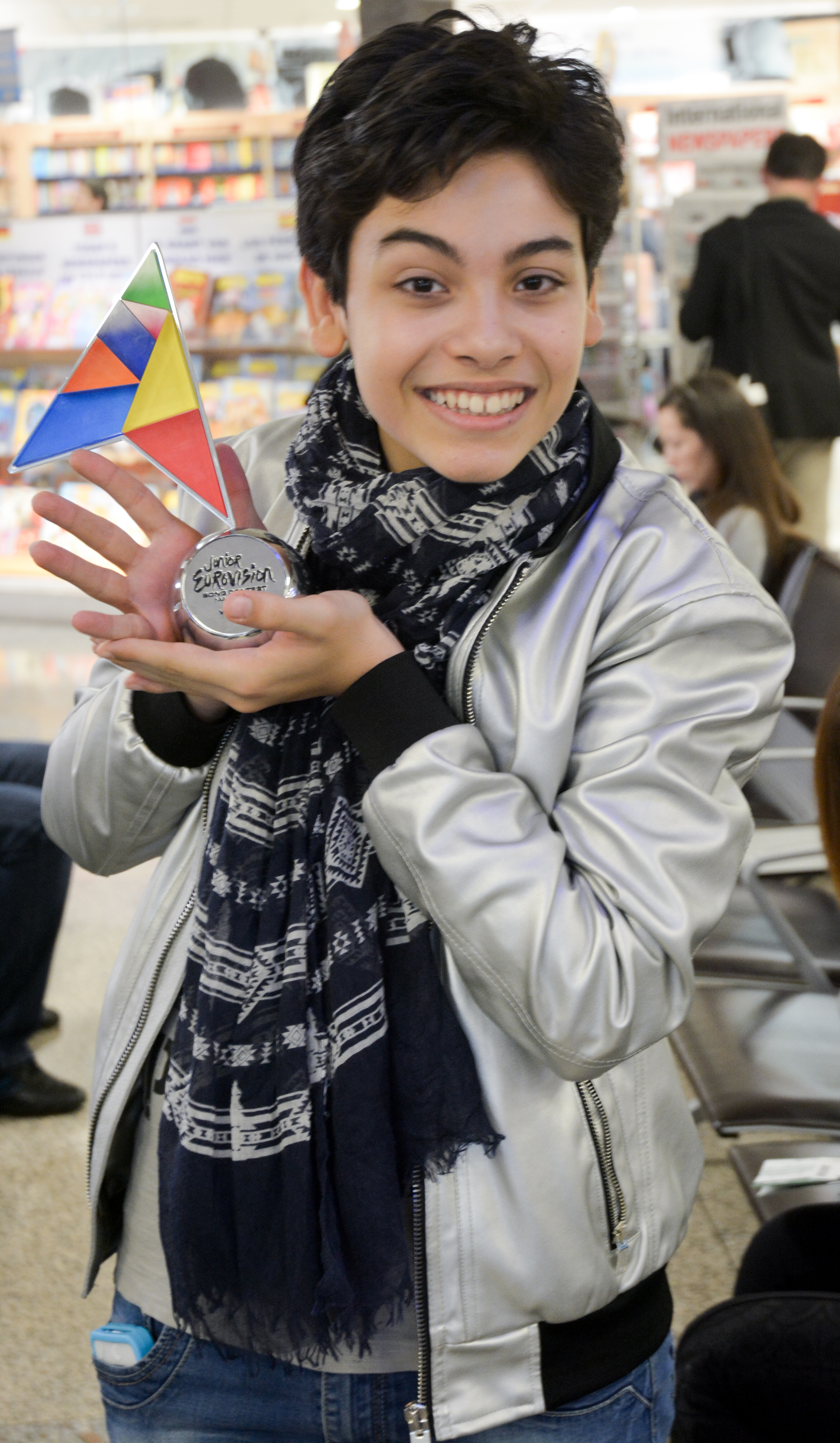
Vincenzo Cantiello, winner of the 2014 contest for Italy.

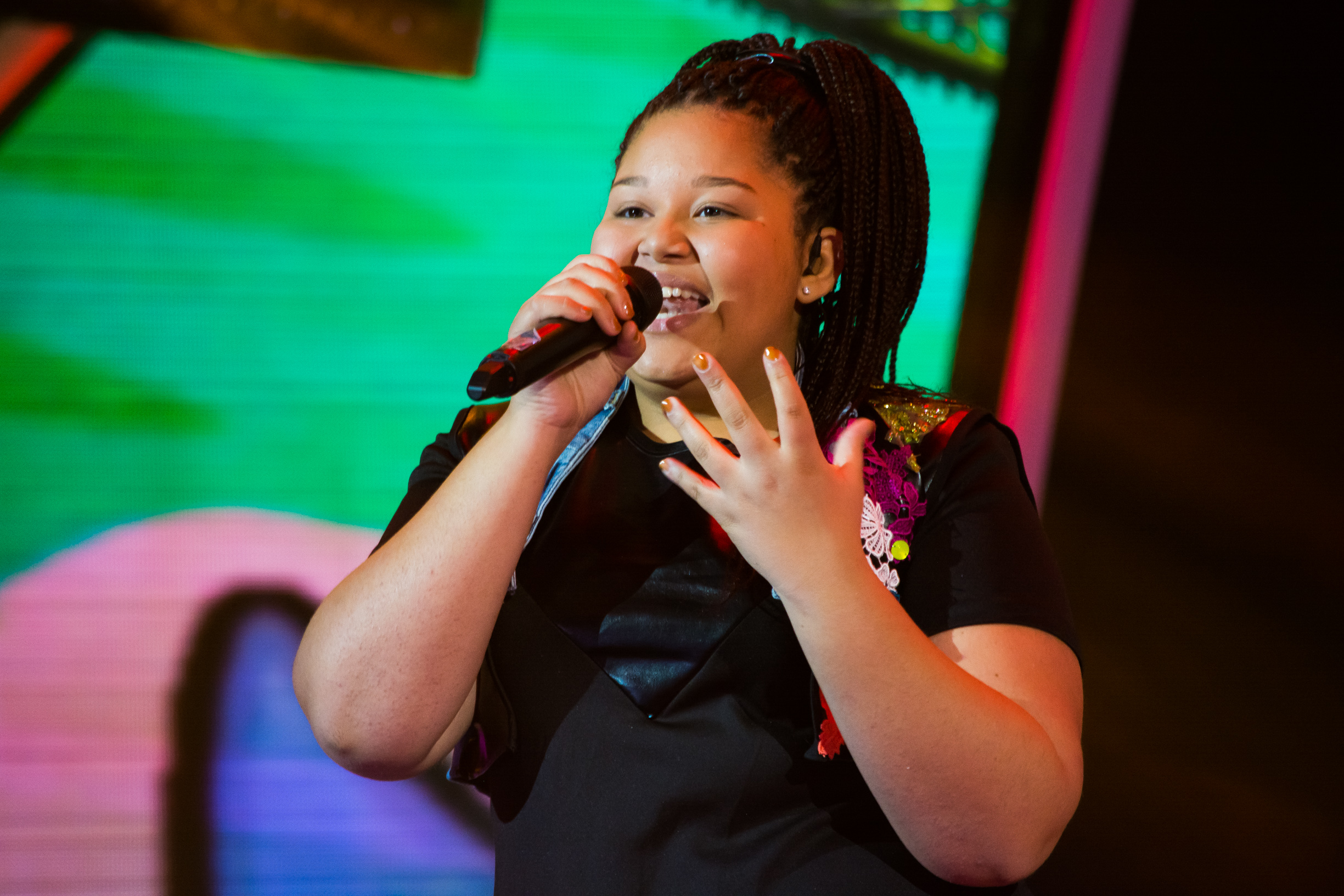
Destiny Chukunyere, winner of the 2015 contest for Malta.

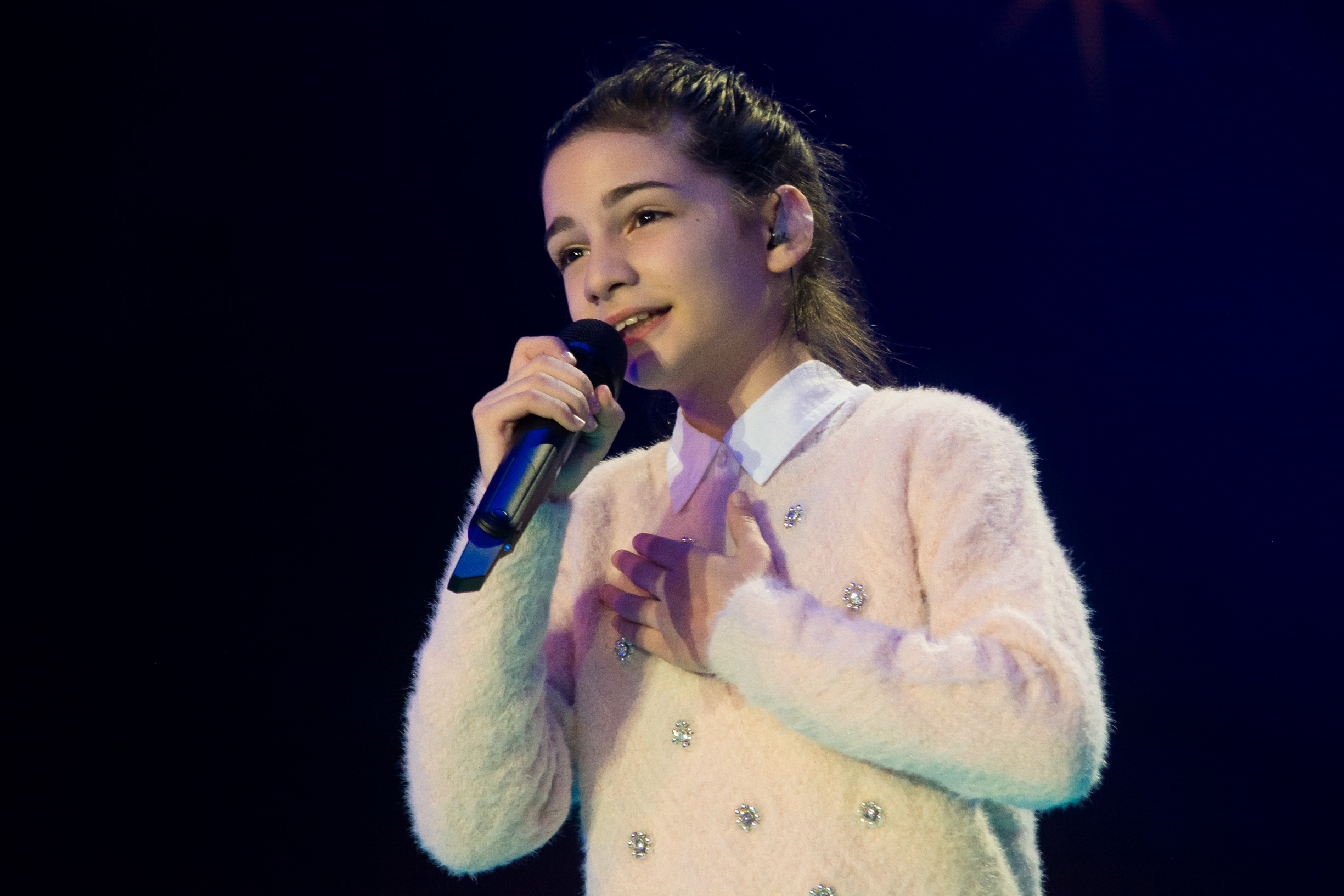
Mariam Mamadashvili, winner of the 2016 contest for Georgia.

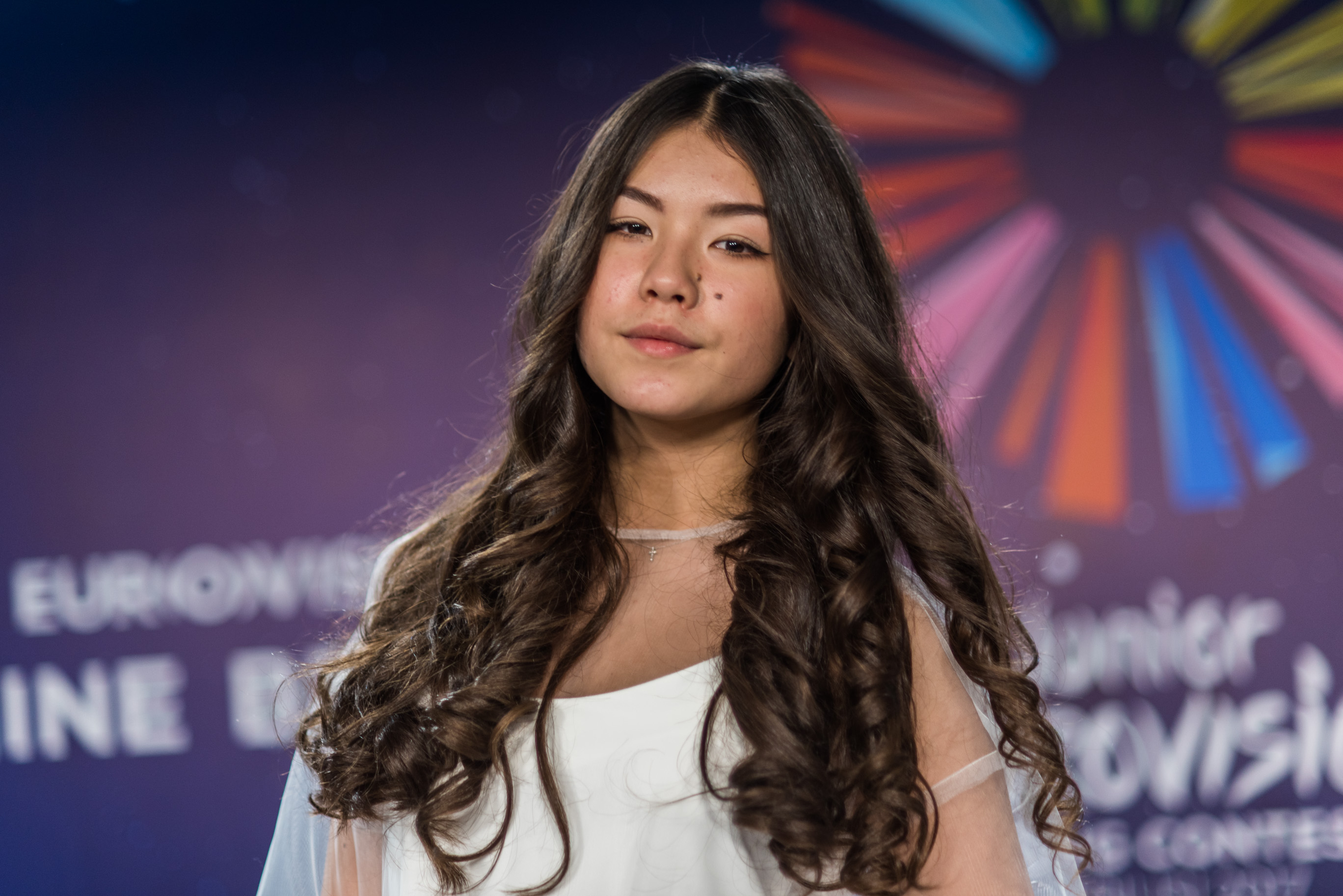
Polina Bogusevich, winner of the 2017 contest for Russia.

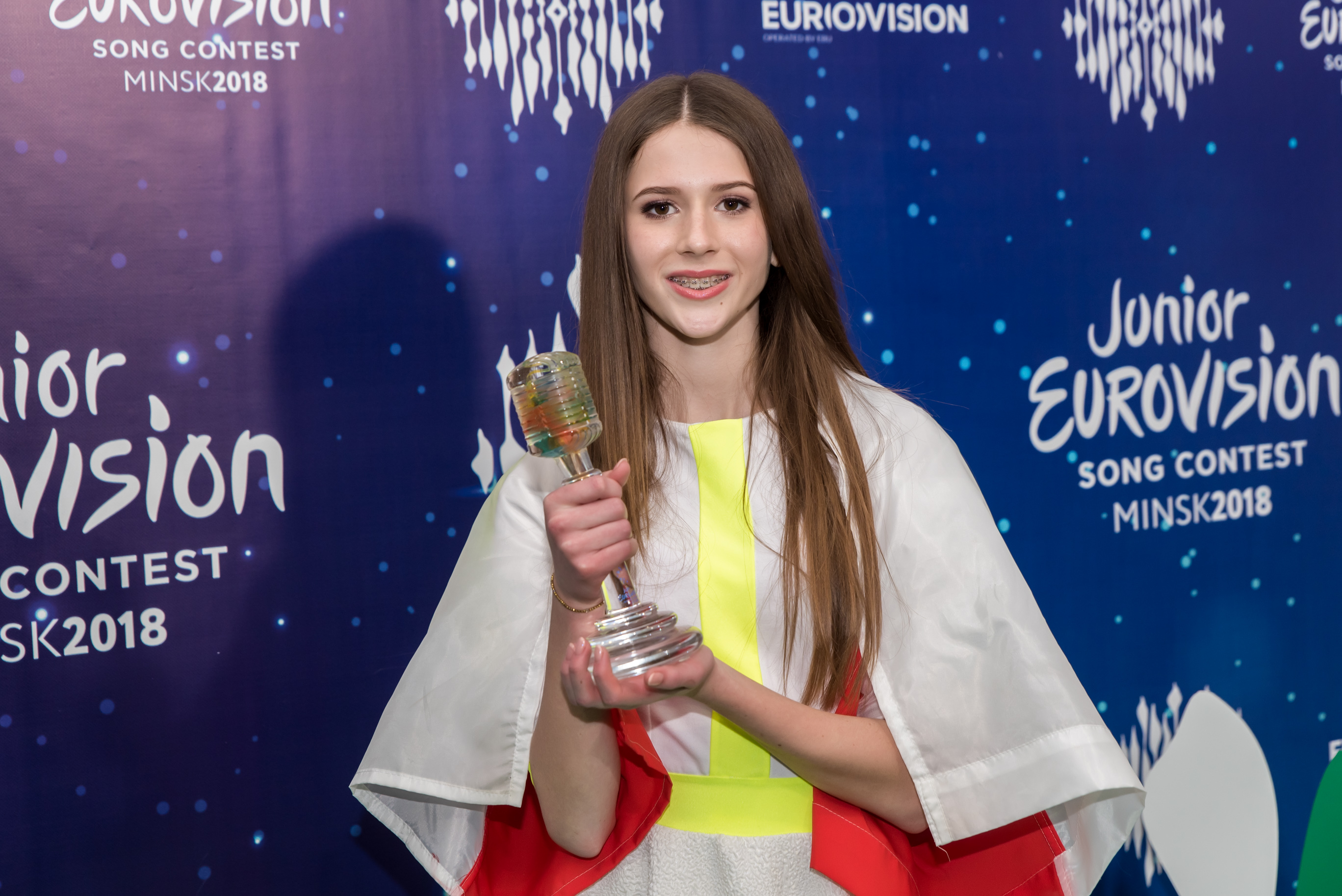
Roksana Węgiel, winner of the 2018 contest for Poland.

Viki Gabor, winner of the 2019 contest for Poland.

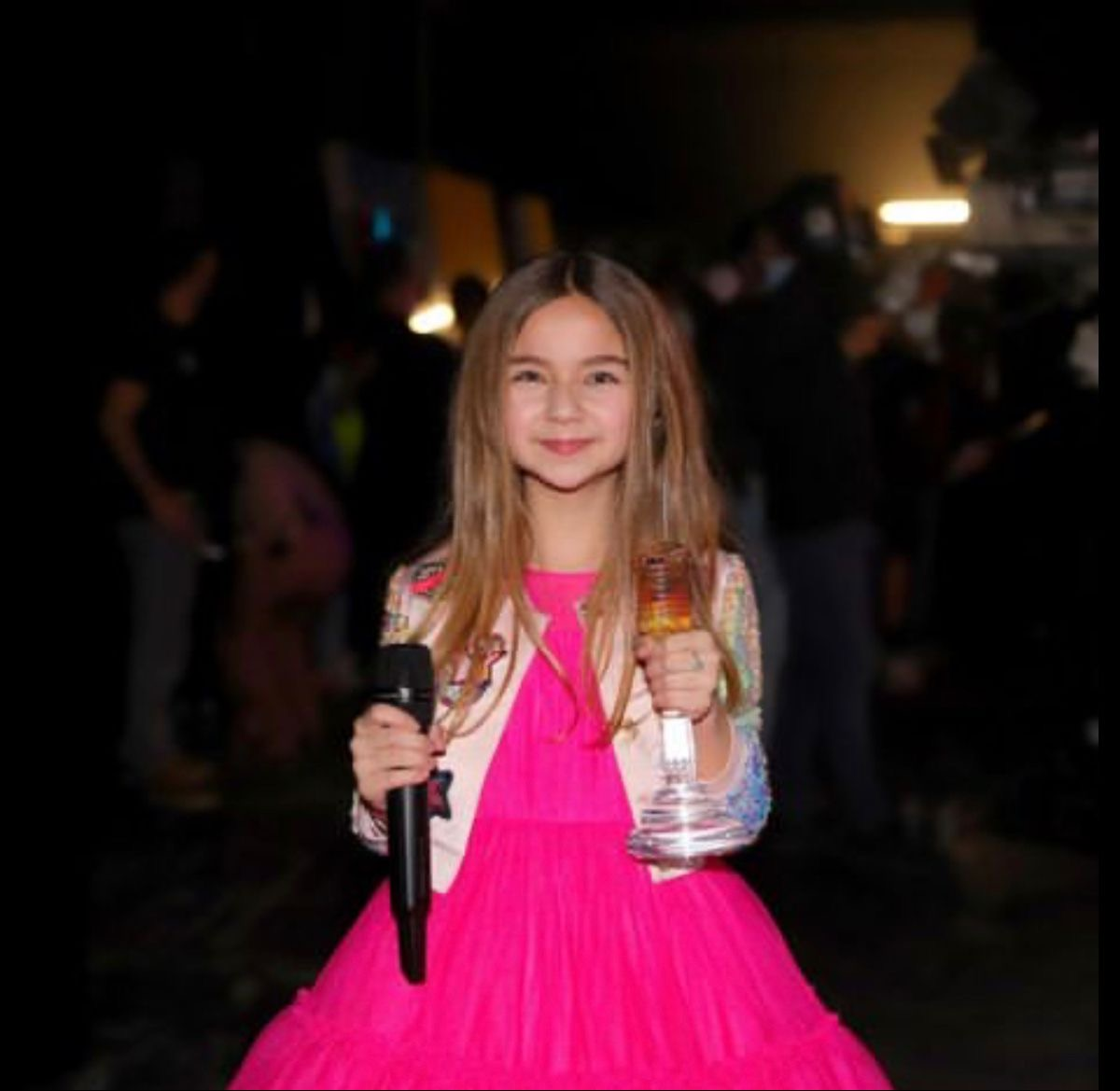
Valentina, winner of the 2020 contest for France.

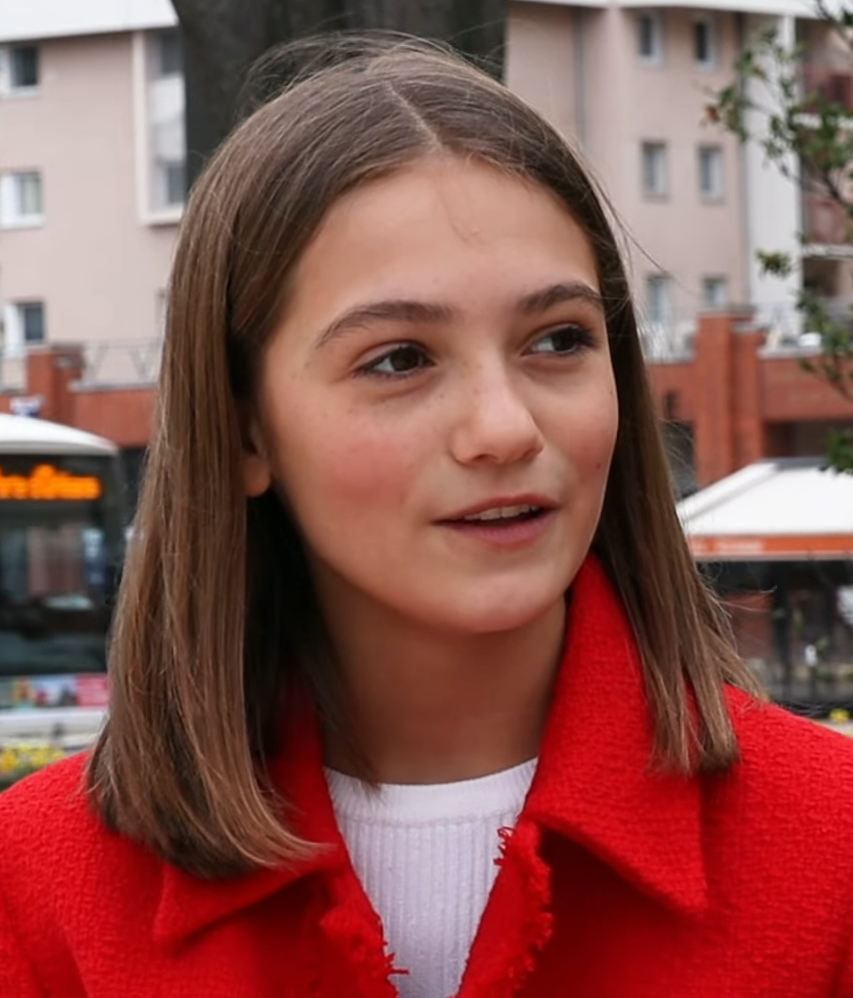
Zoé Clauzure, winner of 2023 contest for France.

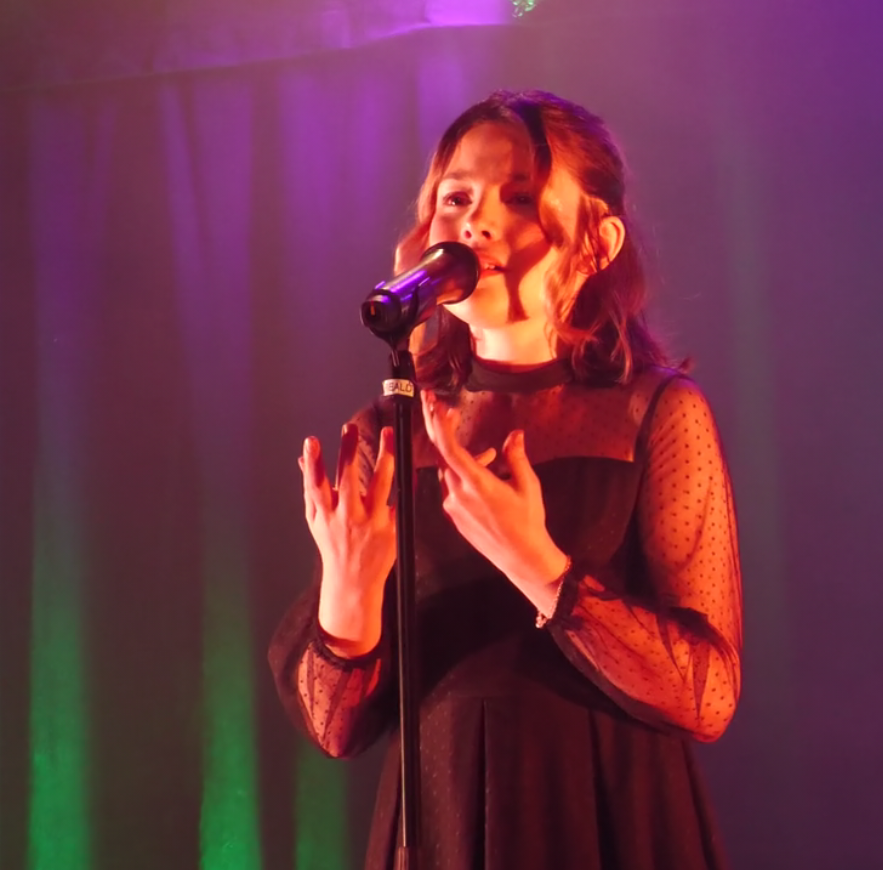
Lou Deleuze, winner of 2025 contest for France.

=== Songwriters ===
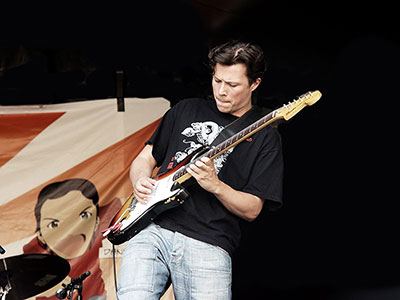
Daniel Davidsen, winner of the 2018 contest for Poland.

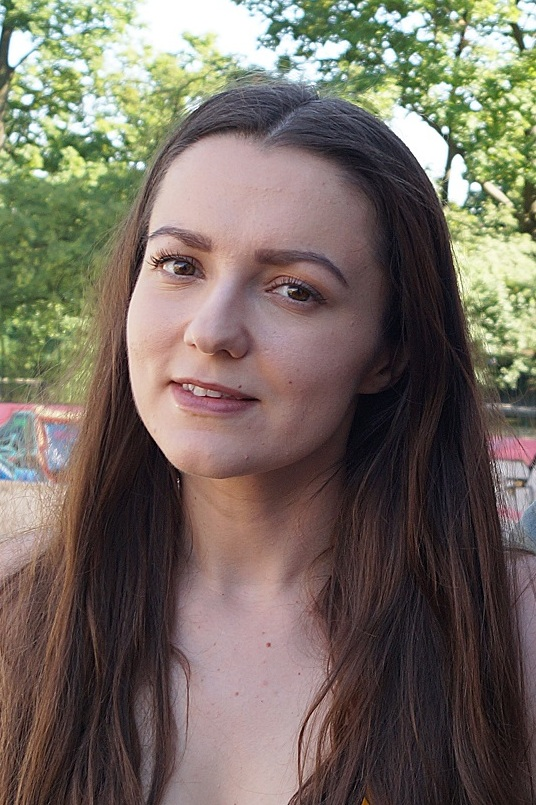
Małgorzata Uściłowska, winner of the 2018 and 2019 contests for Poland.

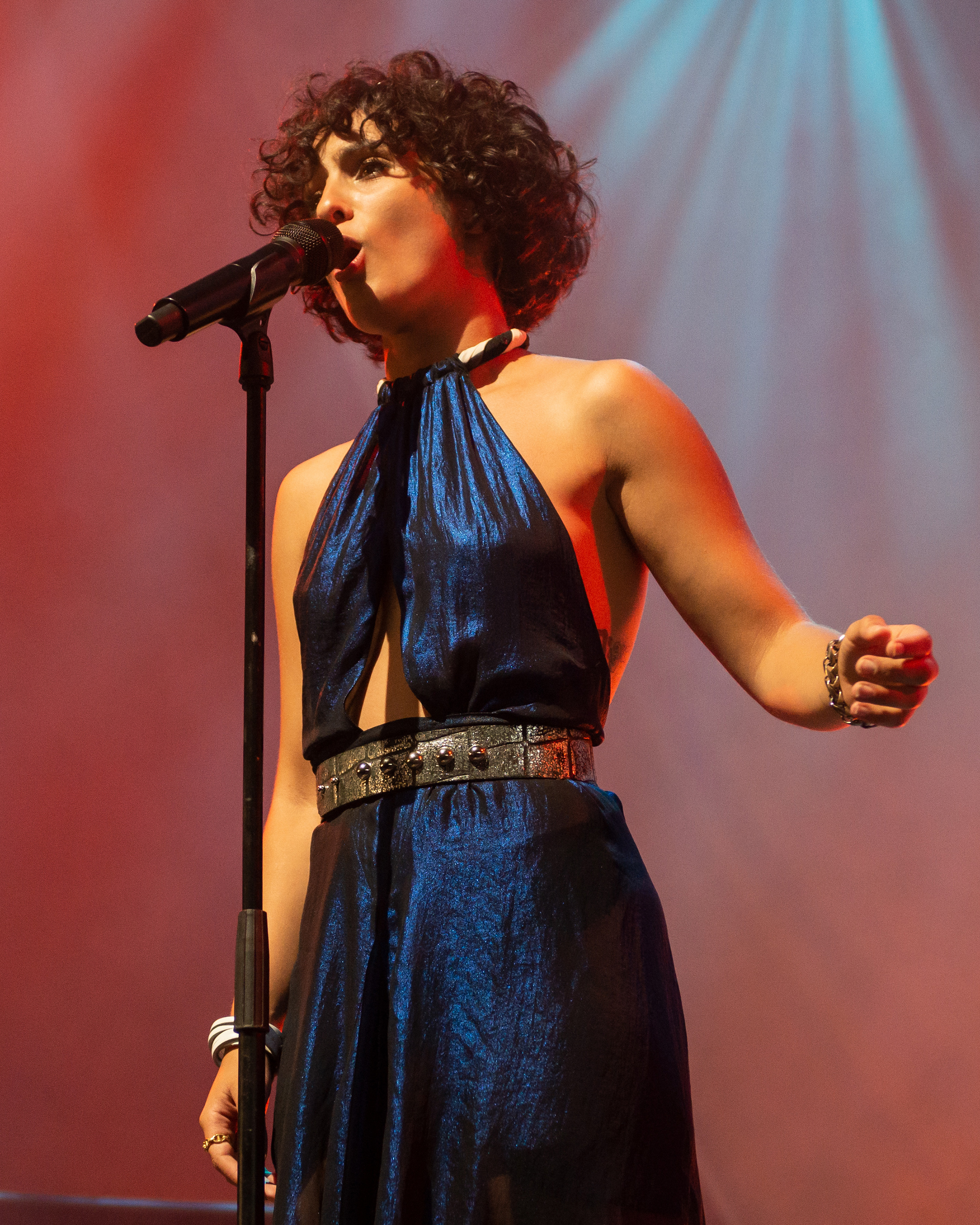
Barbara Pravi, winner of the 2020 and 2022 contests for France.

== See also ==
- List of Eurovision Song Contest winners
