= Lanberry =

- Lanberry in 2026

Background information
- Born: Małgorzata Uściłowska; 12 February 1987 (age 39); Wyszków, Poland
- Genres: Pop; electropop; electronic
- Occupations: Singer; songwriter
- Instruments: Vocals; violin
- Years active: 2010–present
- Label: Universal Music Polska

Małgorzata Uściłowska (born 12 February 1987), known professionally as Lanberry, is a Polish singer and songwriter. She made her debut in 2015 with the release of her debut single "Podpalimy świat", which became certified Gold in Poland. Her debut self-titled album was released in 2016.

== Life and career ==
=== Early life and career ===
Lanberry was born as Małgorzata Uściłowska on 12 February 1987 in Wyszków. She grew up in a musical family, with her father and grandfather both playing the piano, guitar, and violin. She later learned how to play the violin herself. Lanberry attended C.K. Norwid High School in Wyszków, and later moved to Warsaw, where she studied linguistics.

Lanberry began her professional music career through YouTube, posting covers of popular songs. In 2012, she released the album Warsoul Experience with the band Projekt NOD. In 2013, she took part in season three of The Voice of Poland, but did not advance past the blind auditions. The following year, she took part in season four of X Factor, but was eliminated in the judges' houses stage.

=== 2015–2017: Lanberry and Krajowe Eliminacje 2017 ===
After X Factor, Lanberry signed a contract with Universal Music Polska. In September 2015, she released her debut single "Podpalimy świat". The single was certified gold in Poland, and peaked at number-19 on the Polish Music Charts. She later released the follow-up single "Każdy moment", which peaked at number-37. In 2016, she sang the theme song to the Polish version of the children's series Miraculous: Tales of Ladybug & Cat Noir with Jakub Jurzyk. Her debut self-titled studio album was released on 4 March 2016 by Universal Music Polska.

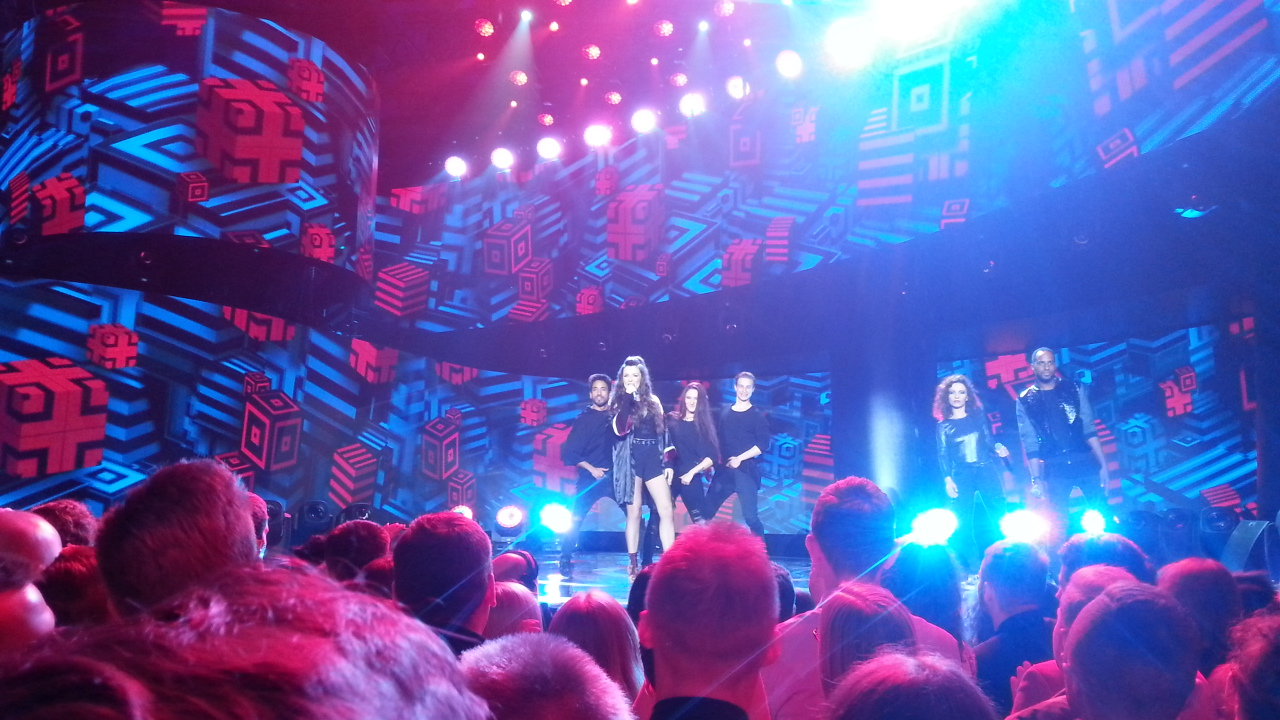
Lanberry performing in 2017.

In August 2016, she released the single "Piątek". The song went on to become her first top ten hit in Poland, peaking at number-seven. She was later confirmed to be taking part in Krajowe Eliminacje 2017, the Polish national final to the Eurovision Song Contest 2017, with the song "Only Human", an English language version of "Piątek". Eurovision rules state that no songs released prior to September 2016 may compete in the Eurovision Song Contest 2017, so Lanberry's participation raised controversy as "Piątek" had been released that August. Eventually, it was decided that she could still compete, and went on to place sixth in the competition. She later rereleased Lanberry in June 2017, with five new tracks including "Piątek" and "Only Human".

Lanberry was selected to support Tove Lo on her Lady Wood Tour show in Warsaw on 19 June 2017. In September 2017, she took part in the 54th edition of the National Festival of Polish Song in Opole, performing the songs "Ostatni most" and "Premiery", the former of which went on to become her highest-charting single, reaching number-two. That November, she released the single "Gotowi na wszystko" along with Polish band Feel off of the soundtrack for the Polish film Gotowi na wszystko. Exterminator.

=== 2017–present: miXtura, songwriting and working on third album ===
Lanberry released her second studio album miXtura on 9 November 2018 with high critics and audience acclaim rewarding with 4 Fryderyki award nominees in 2019: album of the year - pop, best album design, composer of the year (as part of a team: Buczkowski-Wojtaszek, Kumór, Uściłowska) and song of the year - Nie ma mnie. Release was preceded by releasing singles Nieznajomy, Nie ma mnie and promo single Heart of gasoline. Album also includes 2017 hit singles Ostatni most and Gotowi na wszystko.

In 2019 she began to work on her third studio album and released singles Mówiłeś and Zew - both reaching Top25 in Poland. She was again awarded 2 Fryderyki nomination in 2020 for composer of the year and author of the year along with Dominic Buczkowski-Wojtaszek and Patryk Kumór. The trio is responsible for 2 JESC-winning songs, the 2018 Anyone I Want To Be performed by Roksana Węgiel and the 2019 Superhero performed by Viki Gabor. In January 2020 the trio, along with Katarzyna Rooijens, wrote a hit single for Kayah and Viki Gabor, Ramię w ramię, which is one of the biggest Polish songs of 2020 to date.

Early in March 2020 she premiered a new song Tracę which appeared to be a sleeper hit peaking at number 6 in July and becoming her fourth Top10 single. In July, she released a single - "Plan awaryjny", and in November "Mirabelki". On 6 September she won the song "Plan awaryjny" in the competition "Premier" during the 57th National Festival of Polish Song in Opole. On 23 October 2020 her third studio album Co gryzie Ms L ? was released. On 2 July 2021 she released the single „Od zaraz." On 5 August she performed with the Choir of the Maritime University of Szczecin with the song "Tracę" during the Fryderyki 2021 gala. On 1 December 2021 she released the song "Day one in the year" in her interpretation.

On 21 January 2022 she released the single "Nocny express" under the name of the Agora record label, and shortly after it - the song „Niewygodnie". On 20 May she released another song called "Niedziela", and on 1 July - "List". Also in 2022, she became a coach in the thirteenth edition of the program The Voice of Poland. On 11 September 2022 she will on the jury panel of the second semi-final of the talent show Szansa na sukces to select the Polish representative for the Junior Eurovision Song Contest 2022. In 2023, Lanberry returned to The Voice of Poland as a coach in fourteenth edition. Lanberry became the winning coach of the season when her contestant, Jan Górka, won the edition.

== Discography ==
=== Studio albums ===
Album title	Album details
Lanberry	Released: 4 March 2016; Label: Universal Music Polska; Formats: CD, digital download, streaming
MiXtura	Released: 9 October 2018; Label: Universal Music Polska; Formats: CD, digital download, streaming
Co gryzie panią L?	Released: 23 October 2020; Label: Universal Music Polska; Formats: CD, digital download, streaming
Obecna	Released: 25 November 2022; Label: Agora; Formats: CD, digital download, streaming

=== Singles ===
Title	Year	Peak chart positions				Sales	Certifications	Album
Title	Year	POL	POL New	POL Streaming	POL Songs	Sales	Certifications	Album
"Podpalimy świat"	2015	19	1	*	*	POL: 10,000	POL: Gold	Lanberry
"Każdy moment"	2016	37	2	*	*			Lanberry
"Bunt"	2016	—	—	*	*			Lanberry
"Piątek"	2016	7	2	*	*	POL: 10,000	POL: Gold	Lanberry (Reissue)
"Zagadka"	2017	27	3	*	*			Lanberry (Reissue)
"Ostatni most"	2017	2	3	*	*	POL: 10,000	POL: Gold	miXtura
"Gotowi na wszystko" (with Feel)	2017	1	2	*	*	POL: 10,000	POL: Gold	miXtura
"Nieznajomy"	2018	12	1	*	*			miXtura
"Nie ma mnie"	2018	13	4	*	*	POL: 10,000	POL: Gold	miXtura
"Mówiłeś"	2019	24	1	*	*			Non-album single
"Zew"	2019	20	3	*	*			Co gryzie panią L?
"Tracę"	2020	6	1	*	*	POL: 10,000	POL: Gold	Co gryzie panią L?
"Plan awaryjny"	2020	3	2	*	*	POL: 10,000	POL: Gold	Co gryzie panią L?
"Mirabelki"	2020	—	—	*	*			Co gryzie panią L?
"Tylko tańczę"	2021	—	—	*	*			Co gryzie panią L?
"Od zaraz"	2021	—	—	*	*			Non-album single
"Nocny express"	2022	17	1	*	—			Obecna
"Niewygodnie"	2022	—	—	*	—			Obecna
"Niedziela"	2022	—	—	*	—			Obecna
"List"	2022	—	—	*	—			Obecna
"Okna bez firanek"	2022	—	—	*	—			Obecna
"Waniliowe"	2022	15	—	*	—			Obecna
"Stare piosenki" (with Bovska)	2023	—	*	—	—			Non-album singles
"Notting Hill"	2023	—	*	—	—			Non-album singles
"Dzięki, że jesteś" (with Tribbs)	2023	1	*	2	2			Non-album singles
"Co ja robię tu"	2024	8	*	—	—			Non-album singles
"—" denotes items which were not released in that country or failed to chart. "*" denotes the chart did not exist at that time.

== Songwriting ==
=== Entries in Eurovision Song Contest national finals ===
Year	Country	Artist	Song	Result	Songwriters
2017	Poland	Lanberry	"Only Human"	6th	Lanberry, Piotr Siejka, Sarah Reeve
2018	Poland	Saszan	"Nie chcę Ciebie mniej"	6th	Saszan, Lanberry, Piotr Siejka
2018	Poland	Maja Hyży	"Błysk (Skin)"	7th	Lanberry, Jakub Krupski, Krzysztof Morange, Michał Głuszczuk, Piotr Siejka

=== Entries in Junior Eurovision Song Contest ===
Year	Country	Artist	Song	Result	Songwriters
2018	Poland	Roksana Węgiel	"Anyone I Want to Be"	1st	Maegan Cottone, Nathan Duvall, Cutfather, Peter Wallevik, Daniel Davidsen, Małgorzata Uściłowska, Patryk Kumór
2019	Poland	Viki Gabor	"Superhero"	1st	Małgorzata Uściłowska, Patryk Kumór, Dominic Buczkowski-Wojtaszek
2026	Poland	Wiktor Sas	"Gravity"	6th	Antoni Alagierski, Małgorzata Uściłowska, Mikołaj Trybulec, Ulrich Harrison
