= Saszan =

Polish singer

- Born: Roksana Pindor; 1 August 1994 (age 32); Żyrardów, Poland
- Genres: Pop
- Occupations: singer; songwriter; blogger
- Years active: 2013–present
- Labels: My Music; Universal Music Polska
- Website: saszan.pl

Roksana Pindor (born 1 August 1994 in Żyrardów), better known by her stage name Saszan, is a Polish singer. At the Young Stars Festival in 2015 Saszan won the "Best Artist" award. That same year she participated in the Polish TV show Celebrity Splash! where she placed second. In 2016 she signed a record deal with Universal Music Polska. Her debut album RSP peaked at number 2 in the Polish album chart.

She participated in the Polish national final for the Eurovision Song Contest 2018 with a song "Nie chcę ciebie mniej", where she came sixth.

At the beginning of 2020 she announced that she would come back and take part in the Polish national selections for the Eurovision Song Contest 2020 called "Szansa na sukces", but failed to qualify to the final.

== Discography ==
=== Studio albums ===
Title	Album details	Peak chart positions	Sales	Certifications
Title	Album details	POL	Sales	Certifications
RSP	Released: 16 September 2014; Label: My Music; Formats: CD, digital download	2		
Hologram	Released: 17 October 2018; Label: Universal Music Polska; Formats: CD, digital download	24		

=== Singles ===
Title	Year	Peak chart positions	Sales	Certifications	Album
Title	Year	POL	Sales	Certifications	Album
"Świat jest nasz"	2014	—			RSP
"Wybrałam"	2014	—			RSP
"Proste słowa"	2015	—			RSP
"Dizzy"	2016	—			Non-album single
"8 miejsc"	2017	—			Hologram
"Do mnie mów"	2017	—			Hologram
"Nie chce ciebie mniej"	2018	—			Hologram
"Zabierz mnie stąd"	2018	—			Hologram
"Wystarczy" (with Michał Szczygieł)	2019	—			Hologram
"Remedium"	2019	—			Hologram
"Fala"	2020	—			Non-album single
"—" denotes a recording that did not chart or was not released in that territory.
