= Sara James =

Polish singer and songwriter (born 2008)

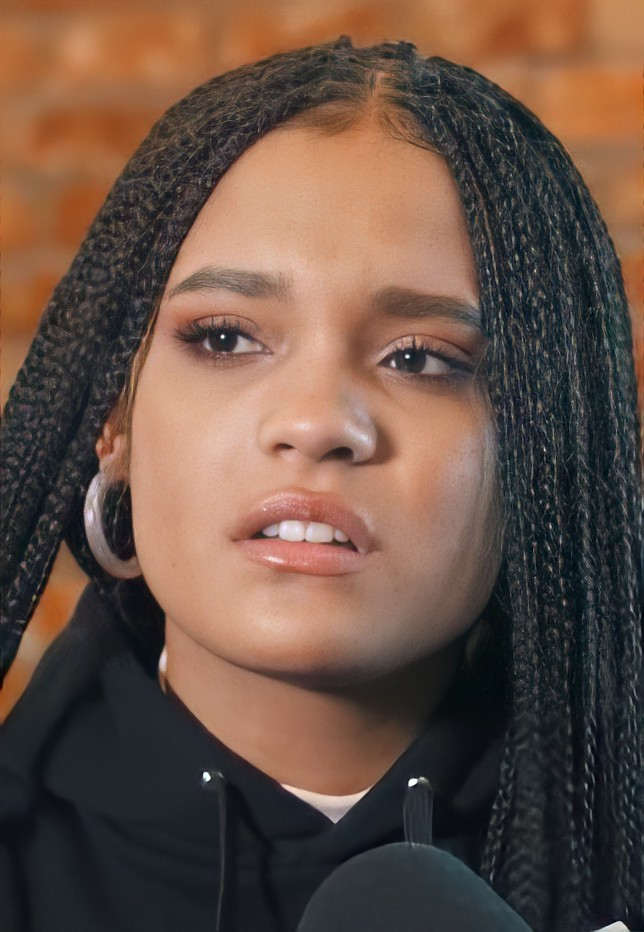
- James in 2021

Background information
- Born: Sara Zofia Egwu-James; 10 June 2008 (age 18); Słubice, Poland
- Genre: Pop
- Occupations: Singer; songwriter
- Instruments: Vocals; piano
- Years active: 2021–present
- Label: Polydor

Sara Zofia Egwu-James (born 10 June 2008) is a Polish singer and songwriter. She won the fourth season of the Polish talent show The Voice Kids in 2021, and represented Poland in the Junior Eurovision Song Contest 2021 with the song "Somebody", finishing as a runner-up. James was also a finalist in the 17th season of America's Got Talent in 2022. She released her debut studio album, Playhouse, in 2024.

== Early life and education ==
Sara Zofia Egwu-James was born on 10 June 2008 in Słubice, Poland, to Polish mother Arleta Dancewicz, and Nigerian father John Egwu-James, who is also a singer. Her parents were married, and divorced. James has younger half-siblings, sister Michelle James, and brothers, John James Junior and Jakub Dancewicz.

During her school years, James experienced racism from her peers due to the colour of her skin, which prompted her to change schools. In 2022, she graduated from the Maria Skłodowska-Curie Primary School in Ośno Lubuskie, Poland, and the Stanisław Moniuszko First Degree State Music School in Słubice, where she studied piano. She then enrolled at the Academic Secondary School for General Education in Słubice, and earned her Matura in 2026. James also studied singing at the Słubice Municipal Cultural Centre.

In 2024, she revealed that she had been diagnosed with attention deficit hyperactivity disorder (ADHD).

== Career ==
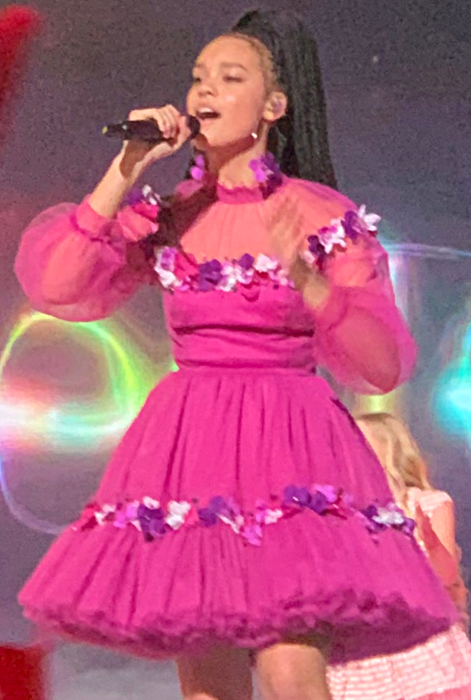
James at the Junior Eurovision Song Contest 2021

At six, James won a festival of Christmas music in Szczecinek, Poland. In 2020, she came third in the World Talent Show, and won an award in the final of the Lubuski Song Festival "Pro Arte" where she also placed third.

In 2021, she competed in the fourth season of the Polish talent show The Voice Kids. She advanced to the final, and was voted the winner. Through another Polish talent show, Szansa na Sukces (English: A Chance for Success), she was selected to represent Poland in the Junior Eurovision Song Contest 2021 with the song "Somebody". At Junior Eurovision, she finished in second place with 218 points (102 points from online voting and 116 points from the jury), six points behind the Armenian representative and eventual winner, Maléna.

In 2022, James auditioned for the 17th season of America's Got Talent. Her performance of Billie Eilish and Khalid's song "Lovely" resonated with the judges and led Simon Cowell to push the Golden Buzzer, sending her directly to the live shows. She qualified for the final, where she performed with The Black Eyed Peas, but did not make the top five. In 2023, she appeared on the show's spin-off, America's Got Talent: All-Stars.

James won the 2023 Fryderyk award for Phonographic Debut of the Year. She voiced Ariel in the Polish-language version of Disney's 2023 musical fantasy film The Little Mermaid, and recorded songs for its soundtrack. Her debut studio album, Playhouse, was released under Polydor Records on 8 November 2024. It earned a Fryderyk nomination for Album of the Year – Pop. In August 2026, it was announced that James would join the coaching panel of The Voice Kids in 2027, six years after she won the show. At age 18, she will become the youngest coach in The Voice franchise.

== Discography ==
=== Studio albums ===
List of studio albums, with selected chart positions
Title	Studio album details	Peak chart position
Title	Studio album details	POL
Playhouse	Released: 8 November 2024; Label: Polydor Records; Formats: CD, digital download, streaming	28

=== Reissues ===
List of reissues albums
Title	Reissues album details
Playhouse... the Full Story	Released: 7 October 2025; Label: Polydor Records; Formats: LP, digital download, streaming

=== Extended plays ===
List of extended plays
Title	Extended play details
Jak co roku	Released: 18 November 2021; Label: Universal Music Polska; Formats: CD, digital download, streaming
Spotify Singles	Released: 11 October 2022; Label: Polydor Records; Formats: Digital download, streaming
Babie Lato 2025 (with Margaret and Zalia)	Released: 30 May 2025; Label: Good Taste Production; Formats: Digital download, streaming

=== Singles ===
List of singles, with selected chart positions and certifications, showing year released and album name
Title	Year	Peak chart position	Certifications	Album
Title	Year	POL	Certifications	Album
"Czarny młyn" (with Kuba Szmajkowski)	2021	—		Czarny młyn
"Somebody"	2021	1	ZPAV: 2× Platinum	Non-album single
"Jak co roku"	2021	—		Jak co roku
"Lecę" (with AniKa Dąbrowska and Marcin Maciejczak)	2022	—		Non-album singles
"Nie jest za późno"	2022	18		Non-album singles
"Na sam szczyt"	2022	—		Non-album singles
"Magia jest w nas"	2022	—		Non-album singles
"My Wave"	2022	—		Non-album singles
"Taka sama"	2022	—		Non-album singles
"Rocketman"	2022	—		Non-album singles
"Running Up That Hill"	2022	—		Non-album singles
"Lovely Christmas"	2022	—		Non-album singles
"Bloodline"	2023	—		Non-album singles
"Hula Hoop"	2023	—		Non-album singles
"Naprawdę chcę"	2023	—		The Little Mermaid (Polish-language version)
"Tylko mnie poproś do tańca" (with Igor Herbut)	2023	—		Non-album singles
"Ctrl Alt Del"	2023	—		Non-album singles
"Brighter Day" (with Ben Cristovao)	2023	9		Non-album singles
"Dziś mnie mija cały świat" (with Szczyl)	2023	—		Non-album singles
"Blue"	2024	—		Playhouse
"I Tell Everyone About You"	2024	—		Playhouse
"Detox"	2024	—		Playhouse
"Sunshine State of Mind"	2024	—		Playhouse
"Psycho"	2024	—		Playhouse
"River"	2024	—		Non-album single
"Salty"	2024	17		Playhouse
"Tiny Heart"	2025	27		Playhouse
"Co za noc" (with Margaret and Zalia as Babie Lato)	2025	20		Babie Lato 2025
"Tattoo" (with Margaret and Zalia as Babie Lato)	2025	—		Babie Lato 2025
"Kiki"	2025	—		Playhouse... the Full Story
"Passport"	2025	—		Playhouse... the Full Story
"M.I.A"	2025	—		Playhouse... the Full Story
"Price Tag"	2026	—		TBA
"Zrób to dla mnie"	2026	—		TBA
"—" denotes items which were not released in that country or failed to chart.

Awards and achievements
Preceded by Ala Tracz with "I'll Be Standing"	Poland in the Junior Eurovision Song Contest; 2021	Succeeded by Laura Bączkiewicz with "To The Moon"
