= Superhero (Viki Gabor song) =

2019 single by Viki Gabor

Single by Viki Gabor
- Released: 30 September 2019
- Genre: Pop
- Length: 2:56
- Label: Universal
- Songwriters: Małgorzata Uściłowska; Patryk Kumór; Dominic Buczkowski-Wojtaszek

Viki Gabor singles chronology
"Time" (2019)	"Superhero" (2019)	"Ramię w ramię" (2020)

Music video
- Superhero on YouTube

(Poland) "Superhero"

Junior Eurovision Song Contest 2019 entry
- Country: Poland
- Artist: Viki Gabor
- Languages: Polish; English
- Composers: Małgorzata Uściłowska; Patryk Kumór; Dominic Buczkowski-Wojtaszek
- Lyricists: Małgorzata Uściłowska; Patryk Kumór; Dominic Buczkowski-Wojtaszek

Finals performance
- Final result: 1st
- Final points: 278

Entry chronology
- ◄ "Anyone I Want to Be" (2018)
- "I'll Be Standing" (2020) ►

"Superhero" is a song by Polish singer Viki Gabor. It represented Poland in the Junior Eurovision Song Contest 2019 on home soil, where it won the competition. The song was written by Małgorzata Uściłowska, Patryk Kumór, and Dominic Buczkowski-Wojtaszek, and was released on 30 September 2019.

== Background ==
"Superhero" was written by Polish singer-songwriter Małgorzata Uściłowska and Polish songwriters Patryk Kumór and Dominic Buczkowski-Wojtaszek. Uściłowska and Kumór had previously cowritten Poland's last Junior Eurovision winning song "Anyone I Want to Be" by Roksana Węgiel. Lyrically, the song speaks about fighting against climate change and supporting environmentalism.

== Junior Eurovision ==
On 29 September 2019, Gabor competed in the finals of Szansa na sukces 2019, after having previously won the second semifinal singing a cover of "You May Be in Love" by Blue Café. In the final, Gabor was given "Superhero" to perform as her selected entry to Junior Eurovision. She went on to win the competition, scoring highest with both the professional jury and televote, winning the right to represent Poland in the Junior Eurovision Song Contest 2019 in Gliwice. The contest took place on 24 November in Gliwice Arena; Gabor performed eleventh, following Yerzhan Maksim of Kazakhstan and prior to Anna Kearney of Ireland. In the voting reveal sequence, Gabor placed second with the professional juries, receiving 112 points, and won the online vote, receiving 166 points; combined, this gave Gabor a score of 278, and she was declared the winner of the competition.

With her win, Gabor became the second Polish entrant to win the competition, and Poland became the first country to ever win Junior Eurovision two years in a row and on home soil. As winners, Poland was given the right of first refusal to host the Junior Eurovision Song Contest 2020, and have publicly stated that they were interested in hosting again.

== Track listing ==
Digital download
No.	Title	Length
1.	"Superhero" (Junior Eurovision 2019 / Poland)	2:56

Digital download
No.	Title	Length
1.	"Superhero" (English Version)	2:56

CD single
No.	Title	Length
1.	"Superhero" (Polish-English Version)	2:56
2.	"Superhero" (English Version)	2:56
Total length:		5:12

== Charts ==
=== Weekly charts ===
Chart (2019)	Peak position
Poland Airplay (ZPAV)	1

=== Year-end charts ===
Chart (2019)	Position
Poland (ZPAV)	63

Chart (2020)	Position
Poland (ZPAV)	71

== Certifications ==
Region	Certification	Certified units/sales
Poland (ZPAV)	2× Platinum	40,000^{‡}
^{‡} Sales+streaming figures based on certification alone.

== Release history ==
Region	Date	Format	Version	Label	Ref.
Various	30 September 2019	Digital download	Original	Universal	
Various	25 October 2019	Digital download	English Version	Universal	
Poland	13 December 2019	CD single	Polish-English Version; English Version	Universal	

== See also ==
- List of number-one singles of 2019 (Poland)
