= Viki Gabor =

Polish singer (born 2007)

- Gabor in 2024

Background information
- Born: Wiktoria Gabor; 10 July 2007 (age 19); Hamburg, Germany
- Origin: Kraków, Poland
- Genres: Pop; R&B; deep house
- Occupations: Singer; songwriter
- Instrument: Vocals
- Years active: 2018–present
- Labels: Universal Music Polska; Sony Music Entertainment Poland; Next Music
- Website: vikigaborofficial.com

Viki Gabor (2019)

Wiktoria "Viki" Gabor (born 10 July 2007) is a Polish singer. She began her career in 2019, as a runner-up on the second season of The Voice Kids Poland, and then later won the Junior Eurovision Song Contest 2019 with the song "Superhero". She is the second Polish entrant to win the contest, and her win marked the first time a country had won the contest twice in a row, with 278 points, highest amount of points in the history of Junior Eurovision and on home soil.

== Early life ==
Wiktoria Gabor was born on 10 July 2007 in Hamburg to a Polish Romani family. After her birth, they returned to Poland, later moving to the United Kingdom, and then settling in Nowa Huta when she was seven. Gabor has an elder sister named Melisa, who is a composer and songwriter.

== Career ==
In late-2018, Gabor competed in the auditions for second season of The Voice Kids Poland. She joined the team of Tomson & Baron, and proceeded to continue to advance through the competition, ultimately reaching the finals and releasing her debut single "Time".

After The Voice Kids, Gabor was selected to perform "Time" at Young Choice Awards of the Top of the Top Sopot Festival 2019. Afterwards, she was selected to compete in the rebooted Szansa na sukces, which was being used to select the Polish representative for the Junior Eurovision Song Contest 2019. Gabor advanced to the finals, where she ultimately was declared the winner with the song "Superhero". Junior Eurovision was held on 24 November in Gliwice. Gabor performed eleventh in the competition, and ultimately won the competition, placing second with the professional juries and scoring the highest with the online fan vote. This win marked Gabor as the second Polish entrant to ever win the Junior Eurovision Song Contest, the first time a performer representing the host-nation won Junior Eurovision, and made Poland the first country to win the contest twice in a row.

Since Junior Eurovision 2019, Gabor has released several singles, including "Ramię w ramię" with Kayah and "Getaway" in late April 2020. As part of a collaborative album with other child singers Roksana Węgiel, Marcin Maciejczak, Zuza Jabłońska and group 4dreamers, Gabor released her song "Still Standing" (co-written by herself and her sister Melisa). Gabor also released her single "Forever and a Night" in July 2020. In August 2020, she released "Not Gonna Get It", the last single from her debut album to be released before its première.

On 10 July 2020, her birthday, Gabor announced her first album (available from 4 September 2020). This album is titled "Getaway (Into My Imagination)".

At the Junior Eurovision Song Contest 2020, hosted in Poland for the second consecutive year following her win, Gabor performed the song "Arcade" as an interval act, together with previous Polish Junior Eurovision winner Roksana Węgiel and Eurovision 2019 winner Duncan Laurence.

In August 2021, she signed a recording contract with Sony Music Entertainment Poland and announced the release of the single "Moonlight," which was released on 3 September. In October, she became the face of ING Bank Śląski's advertising campaign titled Find Your Stage. On 26 November she released a music video for the single "Toxic Love." On 4 February 2022 she released the single "Napad na serce". In the spring of 2022, she took part in the sixteenth edition of the Polsat television entertainment program Your Face Sounds Familiar; after nine episodes, she reached the finals, where she placed fourth. On 21 May she performed during the Polsat SuperHit Festival 2022. On 24 June she performed a duet with Armenian singer and winner of Junior Eurovision 2021 Maléna, during the European Stadium of Culture in Rzeszów, singing Summer Walker's song "Girls Need Love".

She was the spokesperson for the Polish jury at the Eurovision Song Contest 2024 and formed part of the Polish jury for the Junior Eurovision Song Contest 2025.

== Personal life ==
In December 2025, she took part in a traditional Roma wedding ceremony with Giovani Trojanek, the grandson of singer Bogdan Trojanek. The ceremony did not constitute a legally binding marriage under Polish law as it was not accompanied by a civil marriage; Gabor herself acknowledged the event as an engagement. Following the ceremony, she and Trojanek began living together.

== Discography ==
=== Studio albums ===
List of studio albums, with selected chart positions, sales figures and certifications
| Title | Details | Peak chart positions | Sales | Certifications |
| Title | Details | POL | Sales | Certifications |
|---|---|---|---|---|
| Getaway (Into My Imagination) | Released: 4 September 2020; Label: Universal Music Polska; Formats: CD, digital download, streaming | 6 | POL: 15,000 | ZPAV: Gold |
| ID | Released: 18 November 2022; Label: Sony Music Entertainment Poland; Formats: CD, digital download, streaming | 24 | | |
| Terminal 3 | Released: 21 June 2024; Label: Sony Music Entertainment Poland; Formats: CD, digital download, streaming | — | | |
| Spektrum uczuć | Released: 14 November 2025; Label: Next Music; Formats: CD, LP, digital download, streaming | — | | |
"—" denotes a recording that did not chart or was not released in that territory.

=== Extended plays ===
List of extended plays
| Title | Details |
|---|---|
| Time (Remixes) | Released: 12 April 2019; Label: Universal Music Polska; Formats: Digital download, streaming |
| Getaway (Live Acoustics) | Released: 27 May 2020; Label: Universal Music Polska; Formats: Digital download, streaming |

=== Singles ===
List of singles as lead artist, with selected chart positions and certifications, showing year released and album name
| Title | Year | Peak chart positions | Sales | Certifications | Album |
| Title | Year | POL Air. | Sales | Certifications | Album |
|---|---|---|---|---|---|
| "Time" | 2019 | — | | | Getaway (Into My Imagination) |
| "Superhero" | 2019 | 1 | POL: 40,000 | ZPAV: 2× Platinium | Getaway (Into My Imagination) |
| "Ramię w ramię" (with Kayah) | 2020 | 4 | POL: 40,000 | ZPAV: 2× Platinum | Getaway (Into My Imagination) |
| "Getaway" | 2020 | 6 | POL: 10,000 | ZPAV: Gold | Getaway (Into My Imagination) |
| "Forever and a Night" | 2020 | — | | | Getaway (Into My Imagination) |
| "Not Gonna Get It" | 2020 | 46 | | | Getaway (Into My Imagination) |
| "Wznieść się chcę" | 2020 | — | | | Over the Moon |
| "Afera" | 2020 | 15 | | | Getaway (Into My Imagination) |
| "Moonlight" | 2021 | — | | | ID |
| "Toxic Love" | 2021 | — | | | ID |
| "Napad na serce" | 2022 | 24 | | | ID |
| "Could Be Mad" | 2022 | — | | | ID |
| "So What" | 2022 | — | | | Non-album single |
| "Barbie" | 2022 | 16 | | | ID |
| "Cute" (featuring Margaret) | 2022 | — | | | ID |
| "Stop Playing Games" | 2023 | — | | | Terminal 3 |
| "Daj mi znak" | 2024 | — | | | Terminal 3 |
| "Wizja" | 2024 | — | | | Terminal 3 |
| "Kiss and Fly" | 2024 | — | | | Terminal 3 |
| "Usuń strach" (with Alberto)) | 2024 | — | | | Non-album single |
| "Co z nami będzie?" (with Sentino and Trueman) | 2024 | — | | | Business Nothing Personal |
| "Czym chata bogata" (with Cleo, Wac Toja, Golec uOrkiestra and Donatan) | 2025 | — | | | Równonoc: Raróg |
| "Wszystko co mam" | 2025 | — | | | Spektrum uczuć |
| "Bomba" | 2025 | — | | | Spektrum uczuć |
| "Peligroso" (featuring Malik Montana) | 2025 | — | | | Spektrum uczuć |
| "Mów do mnie" (with OG kamka) | 2025 | — | | | Non-album single |
"—" denotes a recording that did not chart or was not released in that territory.

=== Promotional singles ===
List of songs, showing year released and album name
| Title | Year | Album |
|---|---|---|
| "What Christmas Means to Me" | 2019 | Non-album singles |
| "Silent Night" | 2019 | Non-album singles |
| "Cicha noc" | 2019 | Non-album singles |
| "Still Standing" (Note: "Still Standing" also appears on the compilation album of Śpiewajmy razem.) | 2020 | Getaway (Into My Imagination) |
| "That's What She Said" | 2020 | Getaway (Into My Imagination) |
| "3:30" | 2022 | ID |
| "15 lat" | 2022 | ID |
| "Last Christmas" (Valentina featuring Viki Gabor and Petar Aničić) | 2023 | La magie de Noël |
| "Starszy pan" | 2025 | Non-album single |

=== Guest appearances ===
List of non-single guest appearances, with other performing artists, showing year released and album name
| Title | Year | Other artist(s) | Album |
|---|---|---|---|
| "Pull Up" | 2025 | White 2115 | Bentley Music Mixtape |

== Awards and nominations ==
| Year | Ceremony | Category | Result |
|---|---|---|---|
| 2020 | Fryderyki 2020 | New Face of Fonography | Nominated |
| 2020 | Fryderyki 2020 | Song of the Year ("Superhero") | Nominated |
| 2020 | Fryderyki 2020 | Video of the Year ("Superhero") | Nominated |
| 2020 | Kid's Choice Awards | Favorite Polish Artist | Nominated |
| 2021 | Kid's Choice Awards 2021 | Favorite Polish Artist | Won |

== Notes ==
Awards and achievements
| Preceded by Roksana Węgiel with "Anyone I Want to Be" | Poland in the Junior Eurovision Song Contest; 2019 | Succeeded by Ala Tracz with "I'll Be Standing" |
| Preceded by (Poland) Roksana Węgiel with "Anyone I Want to Be" | Winner of the Junior Eurovision Song Contest; 2019 | Succeeded by (France) Valentina with "J'imagine" |
