= Poland in the Junior Eurovision Song Contest =

- Junior Eurovision Song Contest
- Participating broadcaster: Telewizja Polska (TVP)

Participation summary
- Appearances: 13
- First appearance: 2003
- Highest placement: 1st: 2018, 2019
- Host: 2019, 2020
- Participation history: 2003; 2004; 2005 – 2015; 2016; 2017; 2018; 2019; 2020; 2021; 2022; 2023; 2024; 2025; 2026

Related articles
- Szansa na sukces
- For the most recent participation see Poland in the Junior Eurovision Song Contest 2026

Poland has been represented at the Junior Eurovision Song Contest thirteen times, competing in the first contest in 2003. The Polish participating broadcaster in the contest is Telewizja Polska (TVP). It decided to withdraw from the contest after coming last in both 2003 and in 2004. In 2016, TVP announced that it would return after an 11-year break. Poland was the first country in the history of the Junior Eurovision Song Contest to win twice in a row: in 2018 with "Anyone I Want to Be" by Roksana Węgiel and then in 2019 with "Superhero" by Viki Gabor.

There was some debate on whether Poland could return to Junior Eurovision in 2008. TVP stated that the contestant could be chosen through the existing program Mini szansa, a spin-off of Szansa na sukces, and would be broadcast on the secondary channel TVP2. This however did not materialise, and Poland remained out of the contest. On 14 June 2016, the Head of Music at TVP announced that Poland was considering a return to the Junior Eurovision Song Contest in 2016, after an 11-year absence from the contest. He stated that an invitation was issued to potential participants to submit songs to the broadcaster, but reaffirmed that they had not made a complete decision on whether they would actually be participating. On 30 August 2016, TVP officially confirmed that Poland would return and launched its national selection.

== History ==
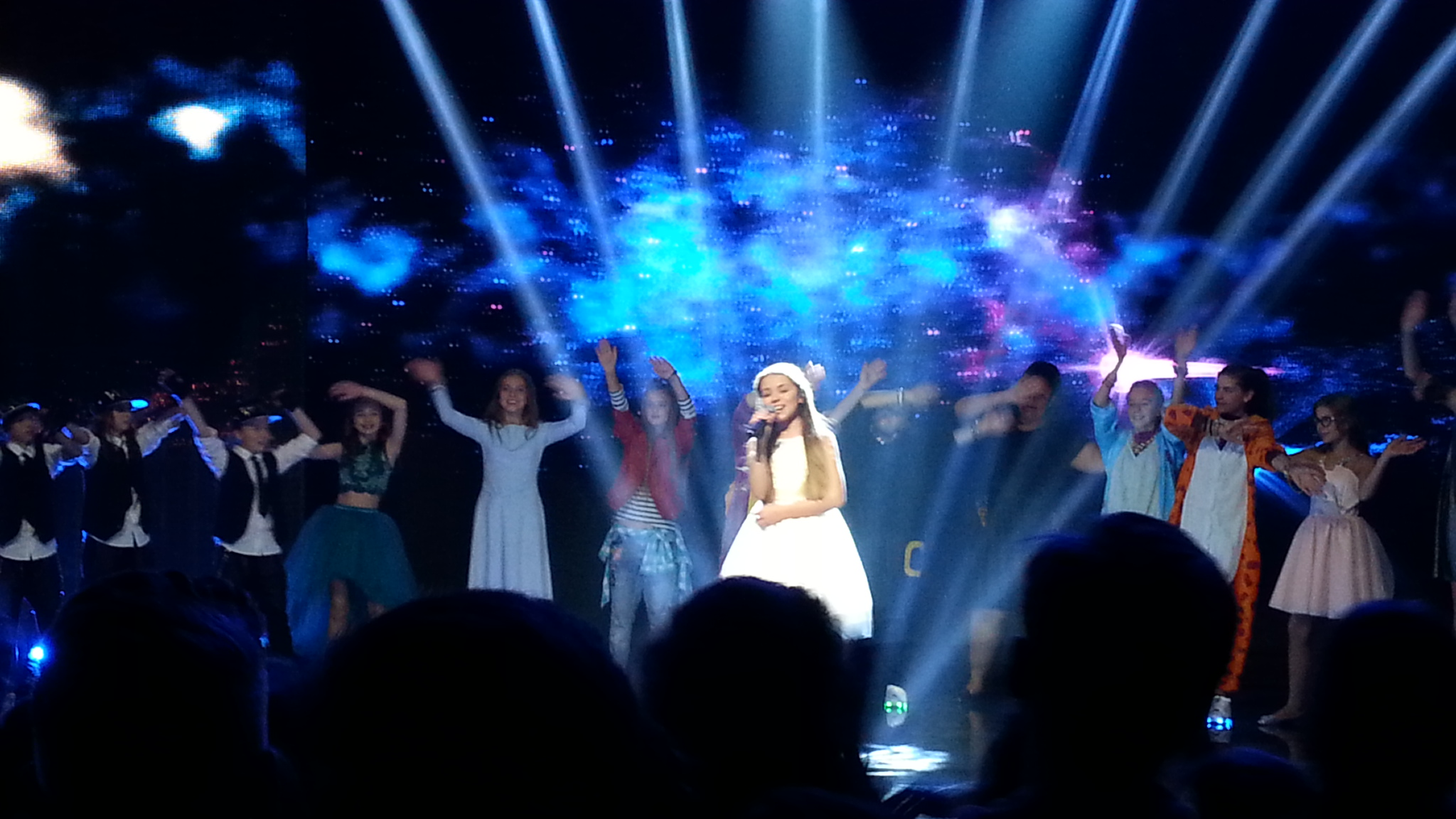
Olivia Wieczorek performing at the 2016 Polish National Final.

Poland made their debut at the inaugural Junior Eurovision Song Contest in 2003. The Polish broadcaster, Telewizja Polska (TVP), were in charge of organising their contest entries. Thirteen participants took part in the first national selection which was held on 28 September 2003. The winner who went on to represent Poland at the Junior Eurovision Song Contest 2003 was Kasia Żurawik with her song "Coś mnie nosi". Żurawik performed in position 7 at the contest. She finished in last place scoring 3 points. In 2004, the girl group KWADro represented the country with the song "Łap życie"; however, Poland again came last scoring 3 points. Despite TVP signing a 3-year contract with the European Broadcasting Union (EBU), they later decided to withdraw from the contest.

Poland had considered returning to Junior Eurovision in 2008, as TVP stated that the contestant could be chosen through the existing program Mini szansa, and would be broadcast on the secondary channel TVP2. However, Poland decided to remain absent from the contest. On 14 June 2016, the Head of Music at TVP announced that Poland was considering a return to the Junior Eurovision Song Contest in 2016, after a 12-year absence from the contest. He stated that an invitation was issued to potential participants to submit songs to the broadcaster, but reaffirmed that they had not made yet a complete decision on whether they would actually be participating. On 30 August 2016, TVP officially confirmed that Poland would return and launched its national selection. In 2018, the form of choosing a representative and song changed - the artist representing Poland was selected internally based on the viewers' votes in the previously aired program The Voice Kids and the song was selected fully internally. Roksana Węgiel was selected as the Polish representative, competing with the song "Anyone I Want to Be". She won the contest and gave Poland its first victory in the competition. In 2019 in Gliwice, the host country returned to a national selection format, reviving the children's talent show Szansa na sukces and using it as the selection method for their artist. Viki Gabor and her song "Superhero" represented Poland and won with 278 points. It is the second time Poland won, the first time a country won on home soil, and the first time a country won the contest twice in a row. As hosts, they finished 9th being represented by Ala Tracz and the song "I'll Be Standing", which is their worst result since 2016. In the following year, Poland achieved its third podium result by finishing in 2nd place with Sara James.

The songwriting collective Hotel Torino has contributed to Poland's four highest-placing entries in the contest. Since its formation, it has written the country's entries in 2021 and 2023, while its members were also credited on the winning entries in 2018 and 2019.

== Participation overview ==
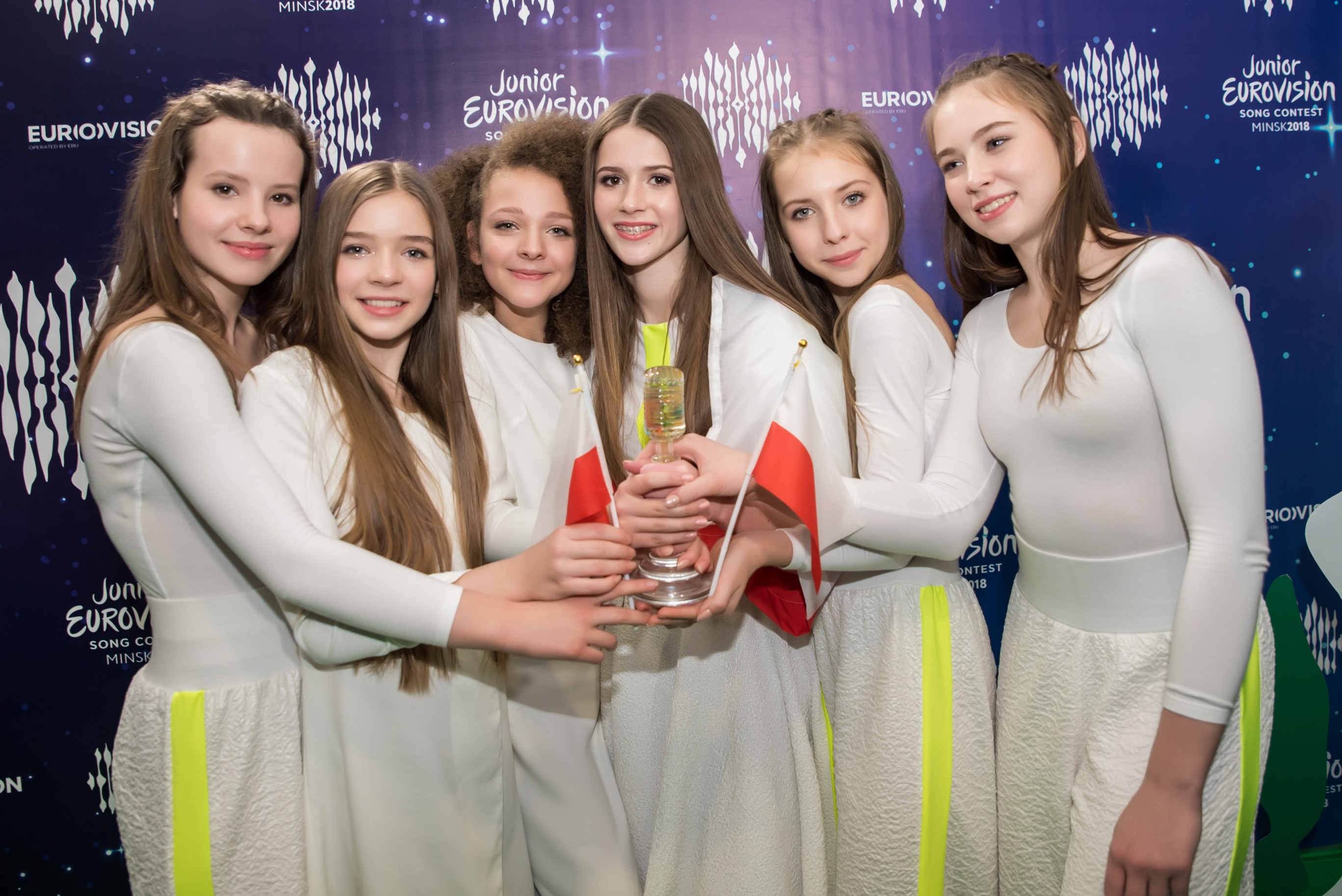
Roksana Węgiel in Minsk (2018)

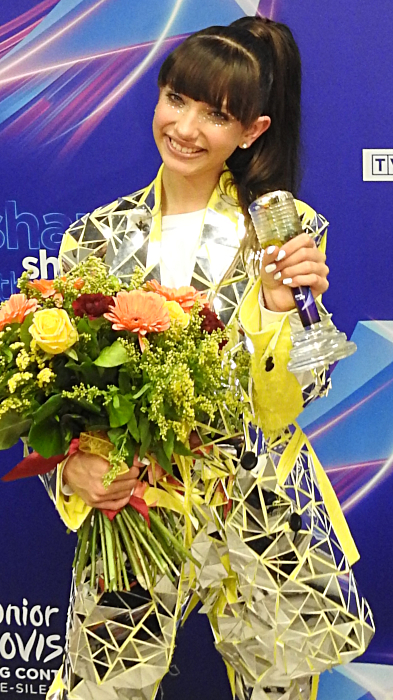
Viki Gabor in Gliwice (2019)

Table key
1	First place
2	Second place
◁	Last place
†	Upcoming event

Year	Artist	Song	Language	Place	Points
2003	Kasia Żurawik	"Coś mnie nosi"	Polish	16 ◁	3
2004	KWADro	"Łap życie"	Polish	17 ◁	3
2016	Olivia Wieczorek	"Nie zapomnij"	Polish, English	11	60
2017	Alicja Rega	"Mój dom"	Polish	8	138
2018	Roksana Węgiel	"Anyone I Want to Be"	Polish, English	1	215
2019	Viki Gabor	"Superhero"	Polish, English	1	278
2020	Ala Tracz	"I'll Be Standing"	Polish, English	9	90
2021	Sara James	"Somebody"	Polish, English	2	218
2022	Laura	"To the Moon"	Polish, English	10	95
2023	Maja Krzyżewska	"I Just Need a Friend"	Polish, English	6	124
2024	Dominik Arim	"All Together"	Polish, English	12	61
2025	Marianna Kłos	"Brightest Light"	Polish, English	8	139
2026	Wiktor Sas	"Gravity"	Polish, English	6	144
2027	Confirmed intention to participate †				

== Commentators and spokespersons ==
The contests are broadcast online worldwide through the official Junior Eurovision Song Contest website junioreurovision.tv and YouTube. In 2015, the online broadcasts featured commentary in English by junioreurovision.tv editor Luke Fisher and 2011 Bulgarian Junior Eurovision Song Contest entrant Ivan Ivanov. The Polish broadcaster, TVP, sent their own commentators to the contest in order to provide commentary in the Polish language. Spokespersons were also chosen by the national broadcaster in order to announce the awarding points from Poland. The table below list the details of each commentator and spokesperson since 2003.

Year	Commentator	Spokesperson	Ref.
2003	Jarosław Kulczycki	Marta	
2004	Artur Orzech	Jadwiga Jaskulski	
2016	Artur Orzech	Nicoletta Włodarczyk	
2017	Artur Orzech	Dominika Ptak	
2018	Artur Orzech	Grace	
2019	Artur Orzech	Marianna Józefina Piątkowska	
2020	Artur Orzech	Marianna Józefina Piątkowska	
2021	Marek Sierocki and Aleksander Sikora	Matylda	
2022	Aleksander Sikora	Viki Gabor	
2023	Aleksander Sikora	Gabriela Wojciechowicz	
2024	Artur Orzech	Maja Krzyżewska	
2025	Artur Orzech	Zosia Wójcik	
2026	Artur Orzech	Marianna Kłos	

== Hostings ==
Year	Location	Venue	Presenters
2019	Gliwice	Gliwice Arena	Ida Nowakowska, Aleksander Sikora and Roksana Węgiel
2020	Warsaw	Studio 5, TVP Headquarters	Ida Nowakowska, Małgorzata Tomaszewska and Rafał Brzozowski

== See also ==
- Poland in the Eurovision Song Contest – Senior version of the Junior Eurovision Song Contest.
