= Roksana Węgiel =

Polish singer (born 2005)

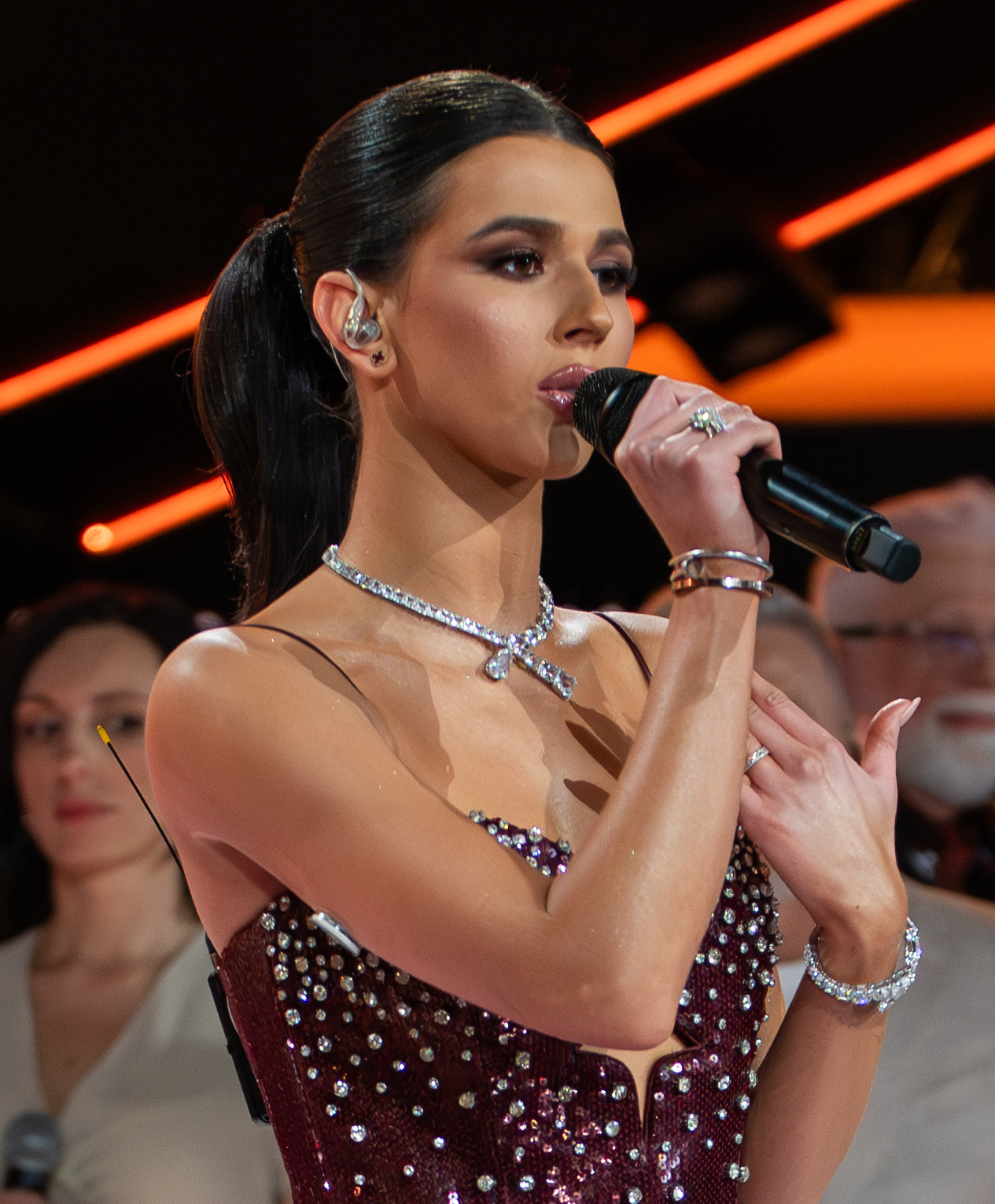
- Węgiel in 2025

Background information
- Also known as: Roxie
- Born: Roksana Emilia Węgiel; 11 January 2005 (age 21); Jasło, Poland
- Genre: Pop
- Occupation: Singer
- Instrument: Vocals
- Years active: 2018–present
- Labels: Universal Music Polska, Unity Records, Roxie Music
- Spouse: Kevin Mglej (m. 2024)
- Website: roksana-wegiel.pl

Roksana Emilia Węgiel-Mglej (née Węgiel; Polish pronunciation: [rɔˈksana ˈvɛŋɡʲɛl]; born 11 January 2005), also known as Roxie, is a Polish singer. She rose to prominence after winning season one of the Polish version of The Voice Kids in 2018. She represented Poland in the Junior Eurovision Song Contest 2018 with the song "Anyone I Want to Be", and went on to win the competition becoming the first Polish entrant to do so.

Her eponymous debut studio album was released in 2019. She is the recipient of the 2019 MTV Europe Music Award for Best Polish Act.

== Early and personal life ==
Węgiel was born in Jasło, Poland, to Rafał and Edyta. She has two younger brothers, Maksymilian and Tymoteusz. As a child, she competed in artistic gymnastics and ballroom dancing, as well as judo internationally. Węgiel began singing at age eight, after performing at a karaoke during a judo camp in Croatia.

Węgiel married 27-year-old Kevin Mglej, who runs a marketing agency, in August 2024. She had dated him since 2023. Following the wedding, she began using a double-barrelled name, Roksana Węgiel-Mglej.

== Career ==
=== 2018–2020: The Voice Kids and Junior Eurovision ===
Węgiel's professional singing career began in 2017, when she auditioned for season one of the Polish version of The Voice Kids. During her blind audition, she sang "Halo" by Beyoncé, and had all three coaches turn their chairs for her, eventually joining the team of Polish singer Edyta Górniak. When Górniak first heard Węgiel's voice, she described her as "unreal" and stated that she did not believe even Beyoncé had such a strong voice at that age. Węgiel was declared the winner in the final on 24 February 2018, during which she performed Górniak's song "To nie ja!", and an original track "Żyj". After winning the competition, she was signed to Universal Music Polska, and released her second single "Obiecuję". In October 2018, Węgiel collaborated with Górniak on the single "Zatrzymać chwilę", recorded for the soundtrack of the Polish version of the film Hotel Transylvania 3: Summer Vacation.

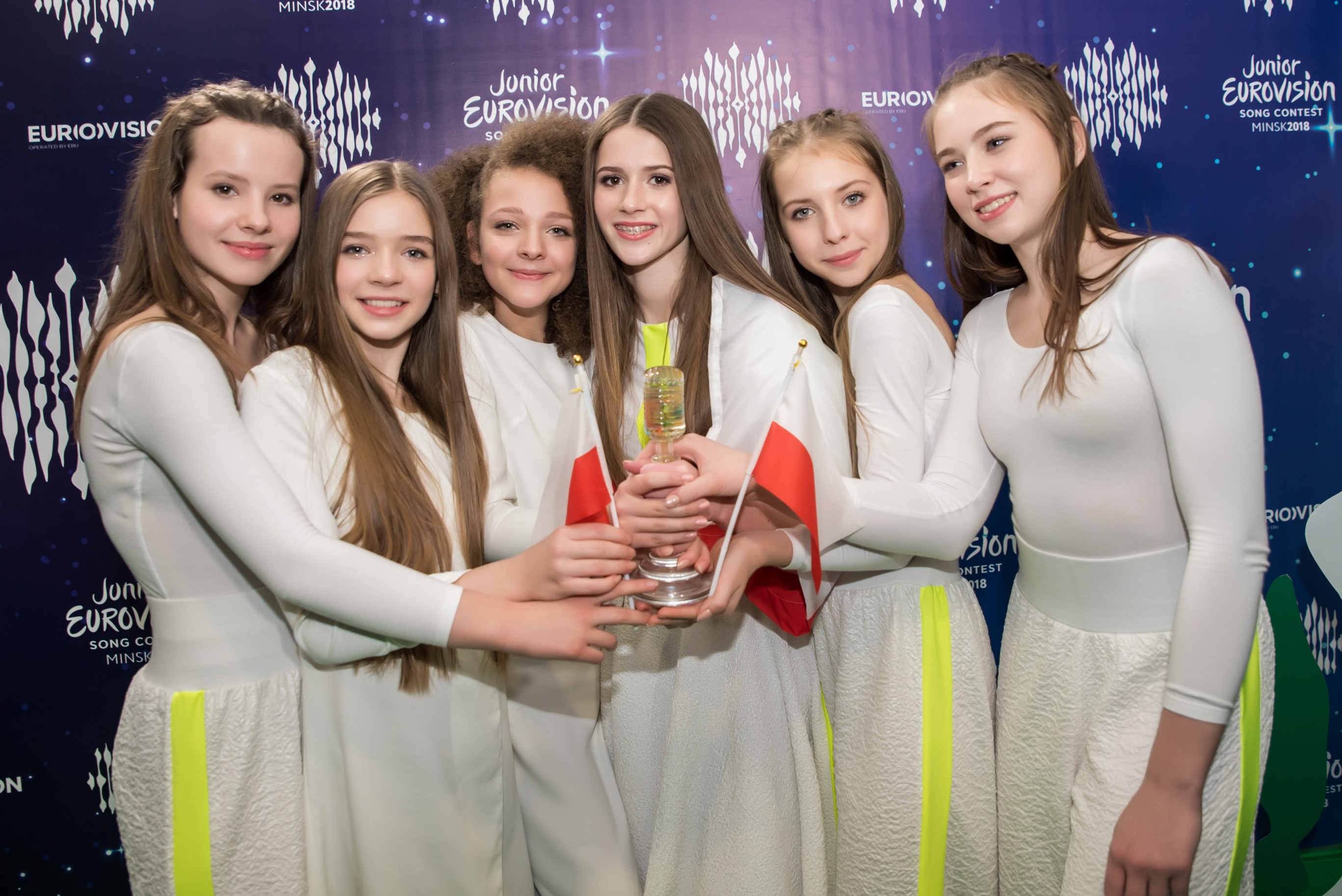
Roksana Węgiel and her dance troupe with Junior Eurovision Song Contest 2018 trophy

Węgiel was chosen by Polish broadcaster Telewizja Polska (TVP) to represent Poland in the Junior Eurovision Song Contest 2018. Her song for the competition, titled "Anyone I Want to Be", was written by an international team consisting of Polish singer Lanberry, Danish producer Cutfather, American songwriter Maegan Cottone and Danish-Norwegian musician Daniel Heløy Davidsen. The song was released on 6 November, with its official music video being released the same day. The video surpassed one million views on YouTube within two weeks, becoming the most-watched video of the 2018 contest. The competition was held on 25 November 2018 in Minsk, Belarus, where Węgiel was eventually crowned the winner, placing first with the viewing public and seventh with the professional juries. Węgiel is the first Polish entrant to win the Junior Eurovision Song Contest.

On 12 April 2019, Węgiel released the single titled "Lay Low", which drew criticism for its racy lyrics branded by some as inappropriate for her age. Her eponymous debut studio album followed in June, and was later certified Platinum by the Polish Society of the Phonographic Industry (ZPAV). On 22 August 2019, she was announced as one of the hosts for the Junior Eurovision Song Contest 2019 along with Ida Nowakowska and Aleksander Sikora, which took place in November. During the event, she also performed as an interval act. In October 2019, Węgiel went on her first tour, The X Tour, in support of her debut album. At the 2019 MTV Europe Music Awards, she won the award for Best Polish Act.

At the Junior Eurovision Song Contest 2020, hosted in Poland for the second consecutive year, Węgiel performed the song "Arcade" as an interval act, together with Junior Eurovision 2019 winner Viki Gabor and Eurovision 2019 winner Duncan Laurence.

=== 2024: Taniec z Gwiazdami ===
In 2024, Węgiel was announced as a contestant on season 27 of Dancing with the Stars. Taniec z gwiazdami, partnered with Michał Kassin. They reached the final and finished as runners-up.

| Week # | Dance / Song | Judges' scores | | | | | Result |
|---|---|---|---|---|---|---|---|
| Week # | Dance / Song | Maserak | Kasprzyk | Wygoda | Pavlović | Total | Result |
| 1 | Cha-cha-cha / "Don't Start Now" | 7 | 7 | 7 | 7 | 28 | No elimination |
| 2 | Quickstep / "Crazy in Love" | 9 | 10 | 8 | 8 | 35 | Safe |
| 3 | Paso doble / "A Man After Midnight" | 10 | 10 | 10 | 10 | 40 | Safe |
| 4 | Waltz / "Moon River" | 9 | 10 | 10 | 10 | 39 | Safe |
| 5 | Jive / "Halo" | 8 | 9 | 9 | 7 | 33 | Safe |
| 6 | Contemporary / "Houdini" | 10 | 10 | 10 | 10 | 40 | Safe |
| 7 | Samba / "Shape of You"; Viennese waltz / "Słucham Cię w radiu co tydzień" | 10; 9 | 10; 10 | 10; 10 | 10; 10 | 40; 39 | Safe |
| 8 | Rumba / "Wicked Game"; Tango / "I've Seen That Face Before (Libertango)" | 10; 10 | 10; 10 | 10; 10 | 10; 10 | 40; 40 | Safe |
| 9 | Salsa / "Hips Don't Lie"; Foxtrot / "Fever" | 10; 10 | 10; 10 | 10; 10 | 10; 10 | 40; 40 | Bottom two |
| 10 | Jive / "I'm So Excited"; Paso doble / "A Man After Midnight"; Freestyle / "Niech żyje bal" | 9; 10; 10 | 10; 10; 10 | 10; 10; 10 | 10; 10; 10 | 39; 40; 40 | Runner-up |

== Discography ==
=== Studio albums ===
List of studio albums, with selected chart positions, sales figures and certifications
| Title | Album details | Peak chart positions | Certifications | Sales |
| Title | Album details | POL | Certifications | Sales |
|---|---|---|---|---|
| Roksana Węgiel | Released: 7 June 2019; Label: Universal Music Polska; Formats: CD, digital download, streaming | 3 | ZPAV: Platinum | POL: 30,000 |
| 13+5 | Released: 31 March 2023; Label: Unity Records; Formats: CD, digital download, streaming | 6 | ZPAV: Gold | POL: 15,000 |
| Błękit | Released: 19 June 2026; Label: Roxie Music; Formats: CD, digital download, streaming | 4 | | |

=== Singles ===
List of singles as lead artist, with selected chart positions and certifications, showing year released and album name
| Title | Year | Peak chart positions | | | Certifications | Sales | Album |
| Title | Year | POL Air. | POL Stream. | POL BB. | Certifications | Sales | Album |
|---|---|---|---|---|---|---|---|
| "Żyj" | 2018 | — | * | | ZPAV: Gold | POL: 10,000 | Roksana Węgiel |
| "Obiecuję" | 2018 | — | * | | | | Roksana Węgiel |
| "Zatrzymać chwilę" (with Edyta Górniak) | 2018 | — | * | | | | Hotel Transylvania 3: Summer Vacation (soundtrack) |
| "Anyone I Want to Be" | 2018 | 4 | * | | ZPAV: Platinum | POL: 20,000 | Roksana Węgiel |
| "Święta to czas niespodzianek" (with Zuza Jabłońska and 4Dreamers) | 2018 | — | * | | | | Non-album single |
| "Lay Low" | 2019 | — | * | | ZPAV: Platinum | POL: 20,000 | Roksana Węgiel |
| "Bunt" | 2019 | — | * | | | | Roksana Węgiel |
| "Dobrze jest, jak jest" | 2019 | 14 | * | | ZPAV: Platinum | POL: 20,000 | Roksana Węgiel |
| "Potrafisz" | 2019 | 46 | * | | | | Roksana Węgiel |
| "Half of My Heart" | 2019 | — | * | | | | Roksana Węgiel |
| "MVP" | 2019 | — | * | | | | Roksana Węgiel |
| "Nie z tej ziemi" (with Małe TGD) | 2020 | — | * | | | | Nie z tej ziemi |
| "Tajemnice" (featuring Pawbeats) | 2020 | — | * | | | | The Secret Garden (soundtrack) |
| "Korona" | 2021 | 15 | * | | | | Non-album singles |
| "Kanaryjski" | 2021 | 33 | * | | | | Non-album singles |
| "Nowa ja" | 2021 | — | * | | | | Non-album singles |
| "Alone" (with Komodo) | 2022 | — | * | — | | | Non-album singles |
| "Głośniej" | 2022 | — | * | — | | | Non-album singles |
| "Ciche szepty" | 2023 | — | — | — | | | 13+5 |
| "Miasto" | 2023 | 7 | 47 | — | ZPAV: 2× Platinum | POL: 100,000 | 13+5 |
| "Jak na filmach" | 2023 | — | — | — | | | 13+5 |
| "Just Us" (with Tribbs) | 2023 | — | — | — | | | MT |
| "Łobuz" (with Beata Kozidrak) | 2023 | — | — | — | | | Non-album singles |
| "Nie mów że kochasz" (with Smolasty) | 2024 | — | — | — | | | Non-album singles |
| "Jedna na milion" | 2024 | 46 | — | — | | | Non-album singles |
| "Falochrony" (with Mata) | 2024 | 31 | 2 | 2 | ZPAV: 2× Platinum | POL: 100,000 | 2039: Złote Piaski |
| "Damą być" (with Maryla Rodowicz) | 2024 | — | 93 | — | | | Niech żyje bal |
| "Nieładnie" (with Anastazja Maciąg) | 2024 | — | — | — | | | Domino |
| "Ah ah ah" | 2025 | — | — | — | | | Non-album single |
| "Twój głos" | 2025 | — | — | — | | | Piep*zyć Mickiewicza 2 |
| "Oops" (with 2KBaby) | 2025 | — | — | — | | | Non-album singles |
| "U" (with 2KBaby and RJ Pasin) | 2025 | — | — | — | | | Non-album singles |
| "Bez słów" | 2025 | — | — | — | | | Non-album singles |
| "Błękit" | 2025 | 5 | 55 | — | ZPAV: Platinum | POL: 125,000 | Błękit |
| "Codzienność (Pamiętaj nas)" | 2025 | 71 | — | — | | | Błękit |
| "Na szeroką wodę" (with Favst) | 2026 | 8 | — | — | | | Błękit |
| "Chciałam ciebie więcej" (with White 2115) | 2026 | 15 | 36 | — | | | Błękit |
| "Jesień trwa (bez końca)" | 2026 | 36 | — | — | | | Non-album single |
"—" denotes items which were not released in that country or failed to chart. "*" denotes the chart did not exist at that time.

=== As featured artist ===
List of singles as featured artist, showing year released and album name
| Title | Year | Certifications | Sales | Album |
|---|---|---|---|---|
| "Live It Up" (B-OK featuring Roxie and Kristian Kostov) | 2019 | | | Non-album single |
| "Przyjdź po mnie" (Pawbeats featuring Roksana Węgiel) | 2021 | | | Nocna |
| "Napad na bank" (Ekipa featuring Roxie) | 2021 | ZPAV: 2× Platinum | POL: 100,000 | Sezon 3 |
| "Friendzone" (Łatwogang featuring Roxie Węgiel) | 2023 | | | Non-album single |
| "Każdej nocy" (Pawbeats featuring Roksana Węgiel) | 2023 | | | Dzienna |
| "Stały ląd" (PlanBe featuring Roxie Węgiel) | 2024 | | | Blue Moon |

=== Promotional singles ===
List of songs, showing year released and album name
| Title | Year | Album |
|---|---|---|
| "True" | 2019 | Roksana Węgiel |
| "Teeth" | 2020 | Non-album singles |
| "Zaśnij dziecino" | 2021 | Non-album singles |
| "Paśli pasterze woły" | 2021 | Non-album singles |
| "Niech Bóg dziś pokój ześle wam" | 2021 | Non-album singles |

== Awards and nominations ==
| Year | Ceremony | Category | Result |
|---|---|---|---|
| 2019 | Fryderyki 2019 | New Face of Fonography | Nominated |
| 2019 | Kid's Choice Awards | Favorite Polish Artist | Nominated |
| 2019 | Plejada Awards | Debut of the Year | Won |
| 2019 | Przebój Lata RMF FM i Polsatu | | Nominated |
| 2019 | Top of the Top Sopot Festival | Young Choice Award | Won |
| 2019 | JOY Influencer of the Year | Music Influencer | Nominated |
| 2019 | MTV Europe Music Awards | Best Polish Act | Won |
| 2020 | Bestsellery Empiku 2019 | Pop Music | Won |
| 2020 | Fryderyki 2020 | Album of the Year | Nominated |
| 2020 | Kid's Choice Awards | Favorite Polish Artist | Won |

Awards and achievements
| Preceded by Inaugural holder | Winner of The Voice Kids Poland; Season One (2018) | Succeeded by Ania Dąbrowska |
| Preceded by Alicja Rega with "Mój dom" | Poland in the Junior Eurovision Song Contest; 2018 | Succeeded by Viki Gabor with "Superhero" |
| Preceded by (Russia) Polina Bogusevich with "Wings" | Winner of the Junior Eurovision Song Contest; 2018 | Succeeded by (Poland) Viki Gabor with "Superhero" |
| Preceded by (Belarus) Evgeny Perlin, Zinaida Kupriyanovich and Helena Meraai | Junior Eurovision Song Contest presenter 2019; With: Ida Nowakowska and Aleksander Sikora | Succeeded by (Poland) Ida Nowakowska, Małgorzata Tomaszewska and Rafał Brzozowski |
