= Artur Orzech =

Polish presenter

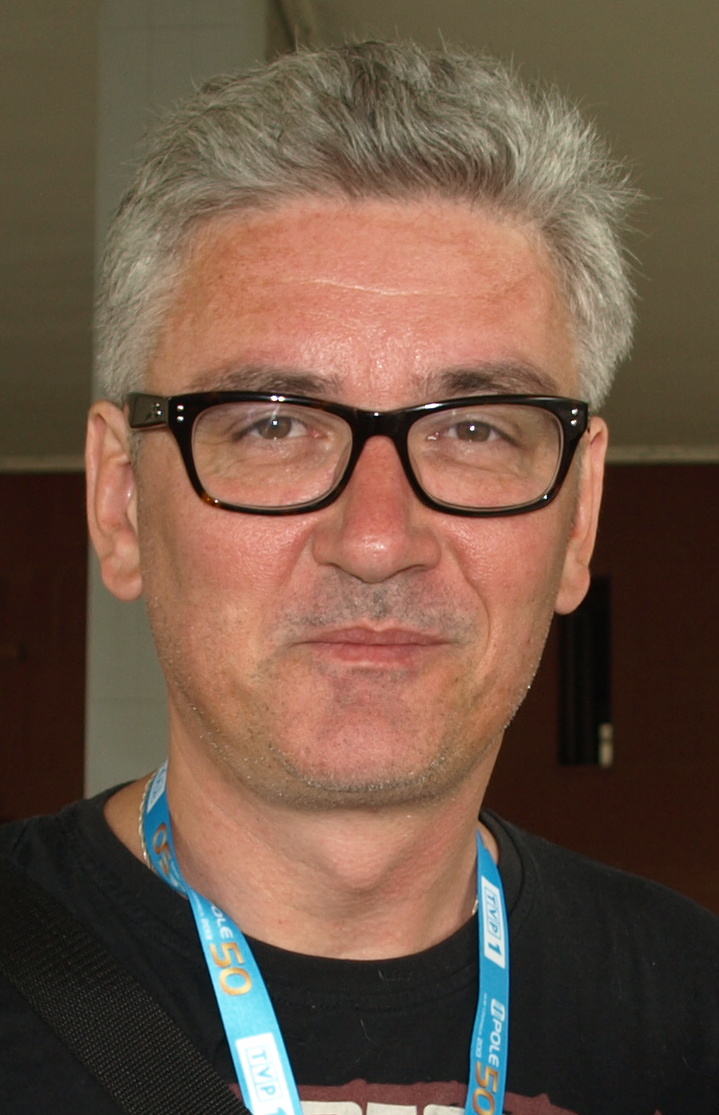
- Artur Orzech (2013)
- Born: 22 February 1964 (age 62); Jelenia Góra, Poland
- Education: University of Warsaw
- Occupations: Journalist; Iranologist; Radio and television presenter; Music broadcaster
- Website: http://www.arturorzech.pl/

Artur Orzech (born 22 February 1964) is a Polish journalist, musician, iranologist, radio and television presenter and music broadcaster.

== Early life and education ==
Orzech graduated from IV Liceum Ogólnokształcące im. Adama Mickiewicza w Warszawie in 1983 with an English degree. In 1989, he earned a Master degree in Iranian Studies from the University of Warsaw. After graduating from the Kabul University, Orzech was teaching assistant at the University of Warsaw between 1989 and 2001. He also worked as a translator for the Ministry of Foreign Affairs.

== Career ==
In 1983, Orzech co-founded the music group Róże Europy, being the author of the first two albums before leaving in 1989 or 1990 to focus on the academic career. However, he returned to the band in 2023.

Between 2001 and 2017, Orzech was a journalist of the Polskie Radio Program III, where he hosted programmes including Prywatna kolekcja and Orzech i reszta.

=== 1992–2021, since 2024: Eurovision Song Contest commentator ===
Orzech joined Telewizja Polska as an continuity announcer. He has since hosted programmes such as Muzyczna Jedynka and Szansa na Sukces. From 1992 until his dismissal in 2021, he served as a commentator on the Eurovision Song Contest for Polish viewers and hosted its national finals.

In March 2021, Orzech was dismissed from his job at Telewizja Polska. According to TVP management, he informed about his absence from the recording of Szansa na sukces program too late due to an "indisposition", which resulted a delay of releasing an episode, and, according to broadcaster's communication release, exposed TVP "to financial and image losses". Later, Orzech explained this by his opposition to a dominant music line of the public broadcaster and his disagreement to host episodes with the participation of the discopoly band Boys or Jan Pietrzak among others. Afterwards, Marek Sierocki and Aleksander Sikora replaced him as Eurovision Song Contest commentators. Orzech was readmitted to TVP in 2024 as the commentator for Eurovision and the host of Szansa na sukces.

== Works ==
- Orzech, Artur; Orzech, Karolina (2014). Wiza do Iranu (in Polish). Warsaw: Wielka Litera. ISBN 978-83-64142-49-9.
