= Anyone I Want to Be =

2018 single by Roksana Węgiel

Single by Roksana Węgiel

from the album Roksana Węgiel
- Released: 6 November 2018
- Genre: Pop
- Length: 2:58
- Label: Universal
- Songwriters: Maegan Cottone; Nathan Duvall; Cutfather; Peter Wallevik; Daniel Davidsen; Małgorzata Uściłowska; Patryk Kumór

Roksana Węgiel singles chronology
"Zatrzymać chwilę" (2018)	"Anyone I Want to Be" (2018)	"Święta to czas niespodzianek" (2018)

Music video
- Anyone I Want to Be on YouTube

(Poland) "Anyone I Want to Be"

Junior Eurovision Song Contest 2018 entry
- Country: Poland
- Artist: Roksana Węgiel
- Languages: Polish; English
- Composers: Maegan Cottone; Nathan Duvall; Cutfather; Peter Wallevik; Daniel Davidsen; Małgorzata Uściłowska; Patryk Kumór
- Lyricists: Maegan Cottone; Nathan Duvall; Cutfather; Peter Wallevik; Daniel Davidsen; Małgorzata Uściłowska; Patryk Kumór

Finals performance
- Final result: 1st
- Final points: 215

Entry chronology
- ◄ "Mój dom" (2017)
- "Superhero" (2019) ►

"Anyone I Want to Be" is a song by Polish singer Roksana Węgiel. It represented Poland in the Junior Eurovision Song Contest 2018, where it won the competition. The song was written by Maegan Cottone, Nathan Duvall, Cutfather, Peter Wallevik, Daniel Davidsen, Małgorzata Uściłowska, and Patryk Kumór, and was released on 6 November 2018.

== Background and composition ==
"Anyone I Want to Be" was written by British-American songwriter Maegan Cottone, British songwriter Nathan Duvall, Danish producer Cutfather, Danish songwriter Peter Wallevik, Danish-Norwegian musician Daniel Davidsen, Polish singer-songwriter Małgorzata Uściłowska and Polish songwriter Patryk Kumór.

Shortly after its victory in Junior Eurovision, Cutfather revealed that the song had been written around five years before submitting it to Polish broadcaster Telewizja Polska (TVP) for the competition. Among other international artists, Iggy Azalea and Rita Ora were previously offered the song.

== Junior Eurovision Song Contest ==
On 21 September 2018, Węgiel was announced by Polish broadcaster Telewizja Polska (TVP) as Poland's entrant in the Junior Eurovision Song Contest 2018, to be held in Minsk, Belarus. Her song was later revealed to be titled "Anyone I Want to Be", and was released on 6 November along with its music video. The contest took place on 25 November in Minsk-Arena. Węgiel was drawn to perform last, following Ela Mangion of Malta. In the jury voting sequence, Poland had placed seventh, receiving 79 points total and one set of the maximum 12 points from France. However, Poland went on to score the highest number of online votes, receiving 136 points. Combined, this left Poland with an overall score of 215 points, placing above runner-up France by a difference of 12 points.

Węgiel's win in the contest gave Poland its first win in the Junior Eurovision Song Contest; they had never previously won the Eurovision Song Contest either. As winners, Poland was given the right of first refusal to host the Junior Eurovision Song Contest 2019, which was held in Gliwice.

== Music video ==
The music video for "Anyone I Want to Be" was released along with the song's release as a digital download, on 6 November 2018. The video surpassed one million views on YouTube within two weeks, becoming the most-watched video of the 2018 contest.

By 2023, the official video for "Anyone I Want to Be" had been played on YouTube over 39 million times, thus being the most-watched video on the official Junior Eurovision YouTube channel, while the live performance in the Junior Eurovision final has over 19 million views.

== Track listing ==
Digital download
No.	Title	Length
1.	"Anyone I Want to Be" (Junior Eurovision 2018 / Poland)	2:58

== Charts ==
=== Weekly charts ===
Chart (2018)	Peak position
Poland Airplay (ZPAV)	4

=== Year-end charts ===
Chart (2019)	Position
Poland Airplay (ZPAV)	59

== Certifications ==
Region	Certification	Certified units/sales
Poland (ZPAV)	Platinum	20,000^{‡}
^{‡} Sales+streaming figures based on certification alone.

== Release history ==
Region	Date	Format	Label	Ref.
Various	6 November 2018	Digital download	Universal	
