= Szansa na sukces =

- Genre: Talent show
- Created by: Elżbieta Skrętkowska
- Presented by: Wojciech Mann (1993–2012); Artur Orzech (2019–2021); Marek Sierocki (2021–2023); Artur Orzech (2024–present)
- Judges: well-known artists, different in every episode
- Country of origin: Poland
- Original language: Polish

Production
- Running time: around 55 minutes

Original release
- Network: TVP2
- Release: 14 November 1993 – 29 April 2012
- Release: 7 April 2019 – present

Szansa na sukces (English: A Chance for Success) is a Polish music talent show aired on the TV channel TVP2. The show ran from 1993 to 2012 and since 2019.

In the program, aspiring singers perform covers of hit singles by Polish recording artist bands which are invited to the show (one band/artist each show). The original singer/group chooses the winner who will sing the same song at the main annual concert in Sala Kongresowa at Palace of Culture and Science. The show is currently presented by Artur Orzech. It was formerly hosted by Wojciech Mann and Marek Sierocki.

== Revival ==
In summer 2019, TVP2 confirmed a reboot but with a different format. This reboot features young singers aged 9 to 14 hoping to represent Poland at the Junior Eurovision Song Contest. On 2 January 2020, it was announced by TVP that it would be used to select the entrant for the Eurovision Song Contest 2020 in Rotterdam.

== Winners ==
Edition	Winner	Artist covered	Song covered
1	Justyna Steczkowska	Maanam	"Boskie Buenos"
2	Wioletta Brzezińska	Alicja Majewska	"Jeszcze się tam żagiel bieli"
3	Anna Świątczak	Sława Przybylska	"Pamiętasz była jesień"
4	Katarzyna Cerekwicka	Ewa Bem	"Wyszłam za mąż, zaraz wracam"
5	Monika Salita	Irena Santor	"Walc Embarras"
6	Małgorzata Markiewicz	Violetta Villas	"List do matki"
7	Arkadiusz Makowski	Shakin 'Dudi	"Za 10 minut trzynasta"
8	Małgorzata Kuś	Edyta Geppert	"Jaka róża, taki cierń"
9	Beata Wald	Bajm	"Szklanka wody"
10	Marzena Korzonek and Aneta Figiel	Tadeusz Nalepa/IRA	"Modlitwa"/"Wiara"
11	Marcin Maliszewski	Stan Borys	"Jaskółka uwięziona"
12	Michał Gasz	Krystyna Prońko	"Papierowe ptaki"
13	Karolina Szarubka	Patrycja Markowska	"Drogi kolego"
14	Anna Józefina Lubieniecka	Wilki	"Eli lama sabachtani"
15	Nina Kodorska	Maryla Rodowicz	"Łza na rzęsie"
16	Daria Zawiałow	Kasia Cerekwicka	"Miłość"
17	Małgorzata Janek	Justyna Steczkowska	"Grawitacja"
18	Marcin Chudziński	Bajm	"Biała armia"
19	Winner was not chosen		
20	Aleksandra Nykiel	Maryla Rodowicz	"Łatwopalni"
21	Izabela Zalewska	Alicja Majewska	"Jeszcze się tam żagiel bieli"
22	Viki Gabor	N/A	"Superhero"
23	Tomasz Jarosz	De Mono	"Póki na to czas"
24	Alicja Szemplińska	N/A	"Empires"
25	Alicja Tracz	N/A	"I'll Be Standing"
26	Łukasz Brodowski	Goya	"Tylko mnie kochaj"
27	Tomasz Bulzak	Czesław Niemen	"Sen o Warszawie"
28	Sara James	N/A	"Somebody"
29	Franciszek Barnowski	Wojciech Młynarski	"Nie ma jak u mamy"
30	Wiktor Kowalski	Irena Santor and Paweł Kukiz	"Już nie ma dzikich plaż"
31	Laura Bączkiewicz	N/A	"To the Moon"

=== Winners of the final SMS voting ===
- 2007 – Christina Bien
- 2008 – Robert Klemens
- 2009 – Mariusz Myrcha
- 2010 – Marzena Ugorna
- 2011 – Marcin Chudziński
