= Universal Music Polska =

- Parent company: Universal Music Group
- Founded: 1998
- Genre: Various
- Country of origin: Warsaw, Poland
- Location: Poland
- Official website: www.universalmusic.pl

Universal Music Polska Sp. z o.o. (Universal Music Poland) is a Polish subsidiary of Universal Music Group, it was founded in 1998 in Warsaw. Labels CEO is Maciej Kutak after Jan Kubicki's departure.

Label was founded after PolyGram, within its Polish subsidiary was brought by Seagram and Universal Music Group was formed. UMP took over PolyGram Poland catalogue which included titles by such artists as Edyta Bartosiewicz, Renata Dąbkowska, Lidia Kopania, Kasia Kowalska and Sweet Noise among others. Although first albums under the label Universal Music Polska have been released in 1999.

UMP catalogue includes also Izabelin Studio (founded in 1989) releases which have been originally brought by PolyGram Poland in 1994 which included titles by such artists as Kolaboranci, Big Day and Closterkeller among others.

Universal Music Polska runs a subsidiary Magic Records Sp. z o.o. which was formed in 1998 with owners of record label Magic Records s.c. which releases dance and electronic music artists. Universal Music Polska runs also music publishing company under the name Universal Music Publishing Sp. z o.o.

UMP distributes in Poland releases of HQT Music Group, that include titles by such artists as Ewelina Lisowska, Taraka, Maciej Czaczyk and Patryk Kumór among others.

== Artists ==
=== Current ===
- Afro Kolektyw
- Agata Szymczewska
- Agnieszka Hekiert
- Ania "AniKa" Dąbrowska
- Ania Rusowicz
- Andrzej Grabowski
- Anna Maria Jopek
- Big Cyc
- Blue Café
- Closterkeller
- Cree
- Damian Skoczyk
- Damian Ukeje
- Dr Misio
- Edyta Strzycka
- Ellie
- Future Folk
- Goya
- Grzegorz Skawiński
- Halina Mlynkova
- KaCeZet & Fundamenty
- Kamila
- Kasia Kowalska
- Kasia Popowska
- Kasia Wilk
- Kim Nowak
- Kins Ferna's
- Kombii
- Lanberry
- Maryla Rodowicz
- Maleo Reggae Rockers
- MashMish
- Michał Kaczmarek
- Muchy
- Natalia Nykiel
- Paulla
- Pink Freud
- Popkultura
- Proletaryat
- Rafał Brzozowski
- Roksana Węgiel
- Sarsa
- Stachursky
- Stanisław Sojka
- Sumptuastic
- Szymon Wydra & Carpe Diem
- Volver

=== Former ===
- Agnieszka Chrzanowska
- Akurat
- Andrzej Cierniewski
- Bartosz Wrona
- Dezire (disbanded)
- Dr Kamszot & Dj Mixdown
- Doda
- Dzika Kiszka
- Edyta Bartosiewicz
- Edyta Geppert
- Elektryczne Gitary
- Ewa Farna
- Formacja Nieżywych Schabuff
- Gabriel Fleszar
- Irena Jarocka (deceased)
- Janusz Wawrowski
- Jacek Krzaklewski
- K2
- Kangaroz
- KarmaComa (disbanded)
- Katarzyna Nosowska
- Konrad Skolarski
- Krzysztof Herdzin
- Kuba Sienkiewicz
- Kumka Olik
- Lady Pank
- Levity
- Maciek Starnawski
- Marek Napiórkowski
- Michał Szpak
- Mold
- Natalia Kukulska
- Niebonie
- Perfect
- Patrycja Markowska
- Piotr Orzechowski (Pianohooligan)
- Shakin Dudi
- Stauros
- Stare Miasto (disbanded)
- Stereo Project
- Świetliki & Bogusław Linda
- Tamara Gee
- Tercet Egzotyczny
- Tosteer
- The Jet Set (disbanded)
- Vir
- Virgin

== See also ==
- BMG Poland
- EMI Music Poland
- Sony Music Entertainment Poland
- Sony BMG Music Entertainment Poland
- Warner Music Poland
