= Ireland in the Junior Eurovision Song Contest 2025 =

- Junior Eurovision Song Contest 2025
- Participating broadcaster: TG4
- Country: Ireland
- Selection process: Artist: Junior Eurovision Éire 2025; Song: Internal selection
- Selection date: Artist: 19 October 2025; Song: 5 November 2025

Competing entry
- Song: "Rúin"
- Artist: Lottie O'Driscoll Murray
- Songwriters: Ian James White; Jenny Ní Ruiséil; Nicky Brennan; Rob O'Connor

Placement
- Final result: 18th, 44 points

Participation chronology

Ireland was represented at the Junior Eurovision Song Contest 2025 with the song "Rúin", written by Ian James White, Jenny Ní Ruiséil, Nicky Brennan and Rob O'Connor, and performed by Lottie O'Driscoll Murray. The Irish participating broadcaster, TG4, selected O'Driscoll Murray as its representative through the national final Junior Eurovision Éire 2025, while the song "Rúin" was internally selected.

== Background ==
Prior to the 2025 contest, TG4 had participated in the Junior Eurovision Song Contest representing Ireland nine times since its debut in 2015; TG4 originally intended to make its debut a year earlier, but required funding from the Broadcasting Authority of Ireland (BAI), which was rejected. Ireland first entered the top ten in 2016, with "Bríce ar bhríce" by Zena Donnelly ending up in 10th place out of 17 entries with 122 points; this would remain as Ireland's only top ten entry and its best result until 2022, when the song "Solas" by Sophie Lennon finished 4th with 150 points. In 2024, "Le chéile" by Enya Cox Dempsey ended up in 15th place with 55 points.

Unlike in the Eurovision Song Contest, where Raidió Teilifís Éireann (RTÉ) is the broadcaster representing Ireland, the Irish-language broadcaster TG4, also a full member of the European Broadcasting Union (EBU), is the Irish participating broadcaster in the Junior Eurovision Song Contest.

== Before Junior Eurovision ==
=== Junior Eurovision Éire 2025 ===
TG4 confirmed its intention to participate in the 2025 contest on 21 January 2025, also revealing that it would once again use the national selection format Junior Eurovision Éire, co-produced with Adare Productions, to select its artist, and opened the submission process for interested artists aged between nine and fourteen. Auditions for the show took place in Dublin, Cork and Athlone, while the selection process was filmed in the Irish capital during the summer of 2025.

Further details of the competition were announced on 24 August 2025. Louise Cantillon returned to host the show for the fifth time in a row. Niamh Ní Chróinín returned as permanent judges, along with the addition Hugh Carr.

==== Participants ====
The ten participants competing in the 2025 edition were revealed at the end of the first show:

- Holly Lennon
- Lia and Olivia
- Teagan Farrell
- Abbie Flatley
- Isla McManus
- Aodán Murphy
- Peter Byrne
- Na Feirmeoirí
- Lottie O'Driscoll Murray
- Brooke Stanton

==== Jury members ====
As in previous editions, the results of the live shows were decided by an in-studio jury of two permanent members and revolving guest judges. The permanent judges are:

- Niamh Ní Chróinín – Radio presenter, manager of Irish-language youth radio station Raidió Rí-Rá
- Hugh Carr – Radio presenter on RTÉ 2fm

Guest judges
Artist	ESC Year(s)	Song(s)	Place (SF)	Points (SF)	Place (Final)	Points (Final)
Linda Martin	1984	"Terminal 3"	No semi-finals		2	137
Linda Martin	1992	"Why Me?"	No semi-finals		1	155
Niamh Kavanagh	1993	"In Your Eyes"	No semi-finals		1	187
Niamh Kavanagh	2010	"It's for You"	9	67	23	25
Brooke Scullion	2022	"That's Rich"	15	47	Failed to qualify	
Emmy	2025	"Laika Party"	13	28	Failed to qualify	

==== First round ====
The second show was broadcast on 28 September 2025, with Brooke Scullion as the guest judge. As happened during the previous edition, all ten finalists performed in the first show with two being eliminated from the competition. The show consisted of all ten artists performing Irish-language covers of popular songs. Na Feirmeoirí and Aodán Murphy did not advance, while the remaining eight contestants progressed to the next round.

Show 2 – 28 September 2025
R/O	Artist	Song (Original artists)	Result
1	Isla McManus	"Torn" (Natalie Imbruglia)	Advanced
2	Peter Byrne	"Believe" (Cher)	Advanced
3	Teagan Farrell	"Skinny Love" (Birdy)	Advanced
4	Na Feirmeoirí	"Teenage Dirtbag" (Wheatus)	Eliminated
5	Brooke Stanton	"I Wanna Be a Cowboy, Baby!" (CMAT)	Advanced
6	Lottie O'Driscoll Murray	"Hold Me While You Wait" (Lewis Capaldi)	Advanced
7	Abbie Flatley	"Leave a Light On" (Tom Walker)	Advanced
8	Lia and Olivia	"Falling Slowly" (Glen Hansard and Markéta Irglová)	Advanced
9	Aodán Murphy	"Unchained Melody" (The Righteous Brothers)	Eliminated
10	Holly Lennon	"Castles" (Freya Ridings)	Advanced

==== Second round ====
The third show was broadcast on 5 October 2025, with Niamh Kavanagh as the guest judge. The remaining eight artists performed with another two being eliminated from the competition. The show consisted of all eight artists performing Irish-language covers of popular songs. Teagan Farrell and Holly Lennon did not advance to the next round, while the remaining six contestants progressed to the semi-final.

Show 3 – 5 October 2025
R/O	Artist	Song (Original artists)	Result
1	Lottie O'Driscoll Murray	"I Will Always Love You" (Whitney Houston)	Advanced
2	Brooke Stanton	"Need You Now" (Lady Antebellum)	Advanced
3	Teagan Farrell	"Relight My Fire" (Dan Hartman)	Eliminated
4	Lia and Olivia	"These Days" (Rudimental feat. Jess Glynne, Macklemore and Dan Caplen)	Advanced
5	Isla McManus	"Someone You Loved" (Lewis Capaldi)	Advanced
6	Abbie Flatley	"If I Could Turn Back Time" (Cher)	Advanced
7	Holly Lennon	"Drivers License" (Olivia Rodrigo)	Eliminated
8	Peter Byrne	"Grace" (Lewis Capaldi)	Advanced

==== Semi-final ====
The fourth show was broadcast on 12 October 2025, with Emmy as the guest judge. The remaining six artists performed with three contestants being eliminated from the competition. The show consisted of all six artists performing Irish-language covers of popular songs. Abbie Flatley, Peter Byrne and the duo formed by Lia and Olivia did not advance, while the final three contestants qualified for the final.

Show 4 – 12 October 2025
R/O	Artist	Song (Original artists)	Result
1	Brooke Stanton	"Brave" (Ella Henderson)	Advanced
2	Lottie O'Driscoll Murray	"Stay" (Rihanna feat. Mikky Ekko)	Advanced
3	Abbie Flatley	"When the Party's Over" (Billie Eilish)	Eliminated
4	Isla McManus	"Too Good at Goodbyes" (Sam Smith)	Advanced
5	Peter Byrne	"Take My Hand" (Picture This)	Eliminated
6	Lia and Olivia	"Cheerleader" (Omi)	Eliminated

==== Final ====
The fifth and final show took place on 19 October 2025, with Linda Martin as the guest judge. First, the remaining three finalists performed an Irish-language cover of a popular song from the previous weeks, and then performed a cover of a famous Eurovision song. After revealing Isla McManus and Lottie O'Driscoll Murray as the top 2, they performed another Irish-language cover from the previous weeks. Fourteen-year-old Lottie O'Driscoll was later revealed as the winner chosen by the jury, earning the right to represent Ireland at the Junior Eurovision Song Contest 2025 in Tbilisi.

Show 5 – 19 October 2025
Artist	R/O	Song (Song from the series)	R/O	Song (Eurovision cover)	Result
Brooke Stanton	1	"I Wanna Be a Cowboy, Baby!" (CMAT)	4	"Only Teardrops" (Emmelie de Forest) - Won for Denmark in 2013	Eliminated
Lottie O'Driscoll Murray	2	"Hold Me While You Wait" (Lewis Capaldi)	5	"Hold Me Now" (Johnny Logan) - Won for Ireland in 1987	Advanced
Isla McManus	3	"Torn" (Natalie Imbruglia)	6	"Space Man" (Sam Ryder) - Runner-up for the United Kingdom in 2022	Advanced

Artist	Song (Song from the series)	H. Carr	L. Martin	N. Ní Chróinín	Result
Lottie O'Driscoll Murray	"I Will Always Love You" (Whitney Houston)	-	X	X	1
Isla McManus	"Someone You Loved" (Lewis Capaldi)	X	-	-	2

=== Promotion and preparation ===
As part of the promotion of her participation in the contest, Lottie O'Driscoll Murray met with Georgian ambassador to Ireland Sophie Katsarava in November 2025. On 7 December 2025, TG4 aired a show featuring interviews with the singers who have represented Ireland at the contest and an overview of O'Driscoll Murray's Eurovision journey, titled Junior Eurovision: An 10ú réalt ("Junior Eurovision: the tenth star"), in order to mark ten years since the country's debut.

== At Junior Eurovision ==
The Junior Eurovision Song Contest 2025 will take place at the Gymnastic Hall of Olympic City in Tbilisi, Georgia on 13 December 2025. On 4 November 2025, an allocation draw was held to determine the running order of the contest, ahead of which each song was classified into a different category based on its musical style and tempo. Ireland was drawn to perform in position 7, following the entry from Ukraine and before the entry from the Netherlands.

In Ireland, the event was broadcast on TG4.

=== Voting ===
The same voting system that was introduced in the 2017 edition will be used, where the results will be determined by 50% online voting and 50% jury voting. Every participating broadcaster assembles a national jury that consists of three music industry professionals and two children aged between 10 and 15 who are citizens of the country they represent. The rankings of those jurors are combined to make an overall top ten.

The online voting consists of two phases. The first phase of the online voting will begin on 12 December 2025 when a recap of all the rehearsal performances is shown on the contest's website Junioreurovision.tv before the viewers can vote. After this, voters will also have the option to watch longer one-minute clips from each participant's rehearsal. This first round of voting will end on 13 December at 16:59 CET. The second phase of the online voting will take place during the live show and begin right after the last performance and will be open for 15 minutes. International viewers will be able to vote for three songs. They will also be able to vote for their own country's song. These votes will then be turned into points which will be determined by the percentage of votes received. For example, if a song receives 10% of the votes, it will receive 10% of the available points.

At the end of the show, Ireland received 3 points from juries and 41 points from online voting, placing 18th out of 18. This was Ireland's second last place in the history of the contest.

Points awarded to Ireland
Score	Country
12 points	
10 points	
8 points	
7 points	
6 points	
5 points	
4 points	
3 points	
2 points	North Macedonia
1 point	Spain
Ireland received 41 points from the online vote

Points awarded by Ireland
Score	Country
12 points	Georgia
10 points	France
8 points	Armenia
7 points	Spain
6 points	Portugal
5 points	North Macedonia
4 points	Montenegro
3 points	Ukraine
2 points	San Marino
1 point	Malta

==== Detailed voting results ====
The following members comprised the Irish jury:

- Neil Farren
- Rossa Ó Síoradáin
- Lucy Hayward-O'Leary
- Keira Holmes
- Sophia Mantu

Detailed voting results from Ireland
Draw	Country	Juror A	Juror B	Juror C	Juror D	Juror E	Rank	Points
01	Malta	7	13	3	12	15	10	1
02	Azerbaijan	16	17	17	17	17	17	
03	Croatia	10	10	12	5	8	13	
04	San Marino	8	12	5	8	7	9	2
05	Armenia	6	6	1	4	2	3	8
06	Ukraine	9	7	6	15	4	8	3
07	Ireland							
08	Netherlands	15	15	10	13	12	15	
09	Poland	3	9	14	14	9	11	
10	North Macedonia	5	5	9	3	11	6	5
11	Montenegro	1	14	11	6	13	7	4
12	Italy	17	8	13	16	14	14	
13	Portugal	11	2	7	9	3	5	6
14	Spain	14	11	8	2	1	4	7
15	Georgia	4	4	2	1	6	1	12
16	Cyprus	13	16	16	11	16	16	
17	France	2	1	4	7	5	2	10
18	Albania	12	3	15	10	10	12	
