= Malta in the Junior Eurovision Song Contest 2025 =

- Junior Eurovision Song Contest 2025
- Participating broadcaster: Public Broadcasting Services (PBS)
- Country: Malta
- Selection process: The Voice Kids 2
- Selection date: 19 October 2025

Competing entry
- Song: "I Believe"
- Artist: Eliza Borg
- Songwriters: Destiny Chukunyere; Elton Zarb; Matthew Mercieca

Placement
- Final result: 11th, 92 points

Participation chronology

Malta was represented at the Junior Eurovision Song Contest 2025 with the song "I Believe", written by Destiny Chukunyere, Elton Zarb and Matthew Mercieca, and performed by Eliza Borg. The Maltese participating broadcaster, Public Broadcasting Services (PBS), used the second season of The Voice Kids in order to select its entry for the contest.

== Background ==
Prior to the 2025 contest, Malta had participated in the contest twenty times since its first entry in the inaugural 2003 contest. Since then, Malta has won the contest on two occasions: in 2013 with "The Start" performed by Gaia Cauchi, and in 2015 with "Not My Soul" performed by Destiny Chukunyere. The nation opted not to take part in the contest in 2011 and 2012. In 2024, Ramires Sciberras competed for Malta with the song "Stilla ċkejkna", which ended up in 5th place out of 17 entries with 153 points.

== Before Junior Eurovision ==
=== The Voice Kids 2 ===
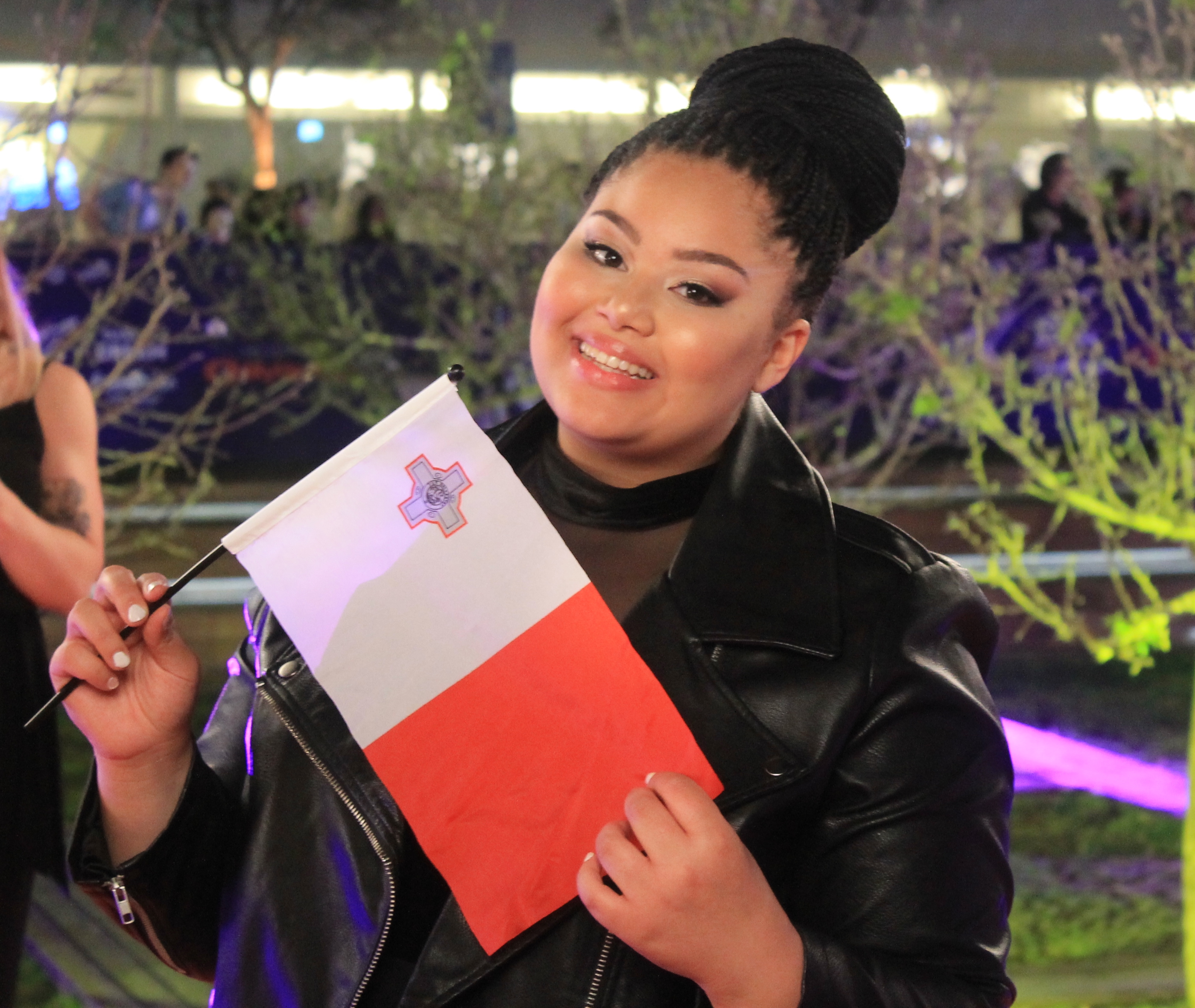
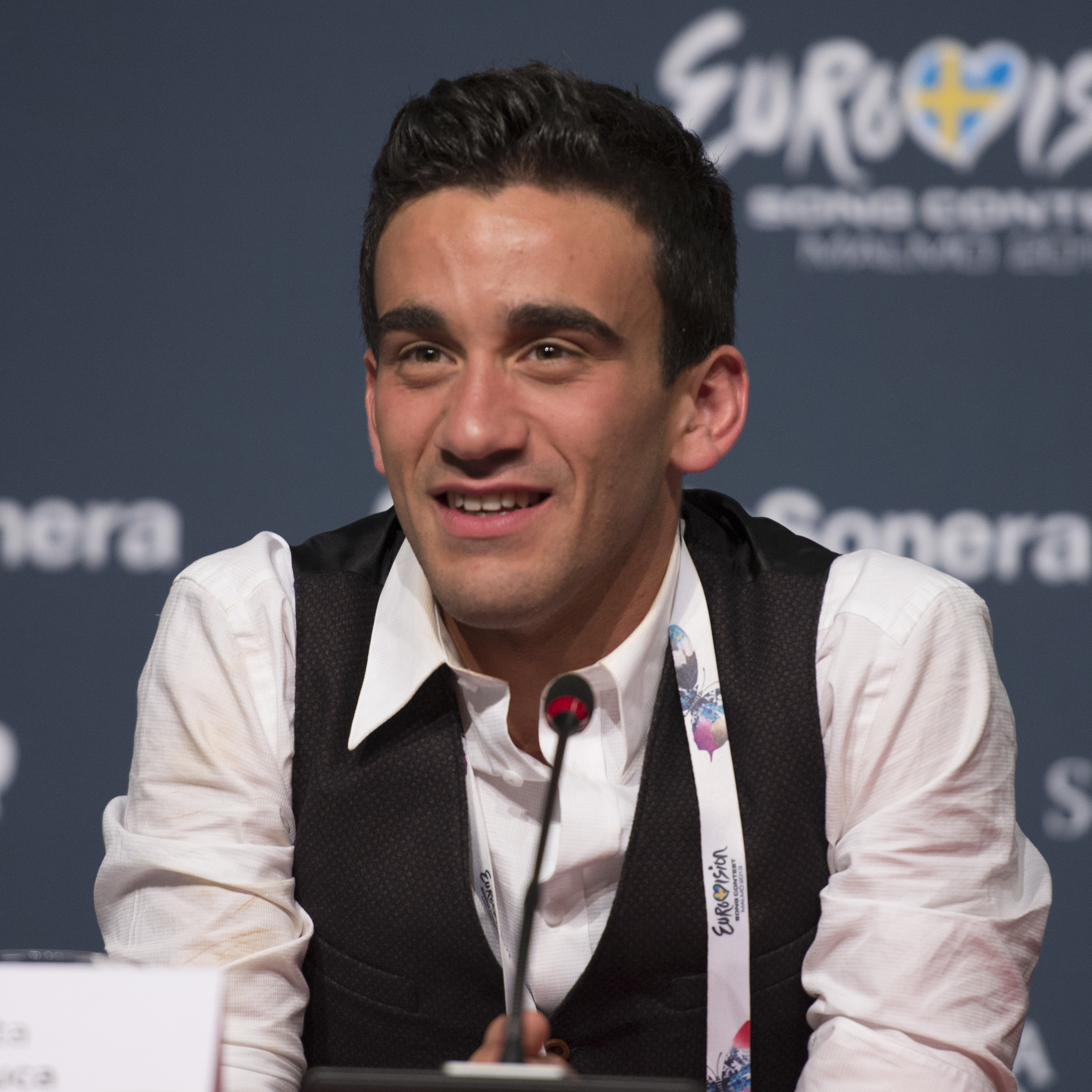
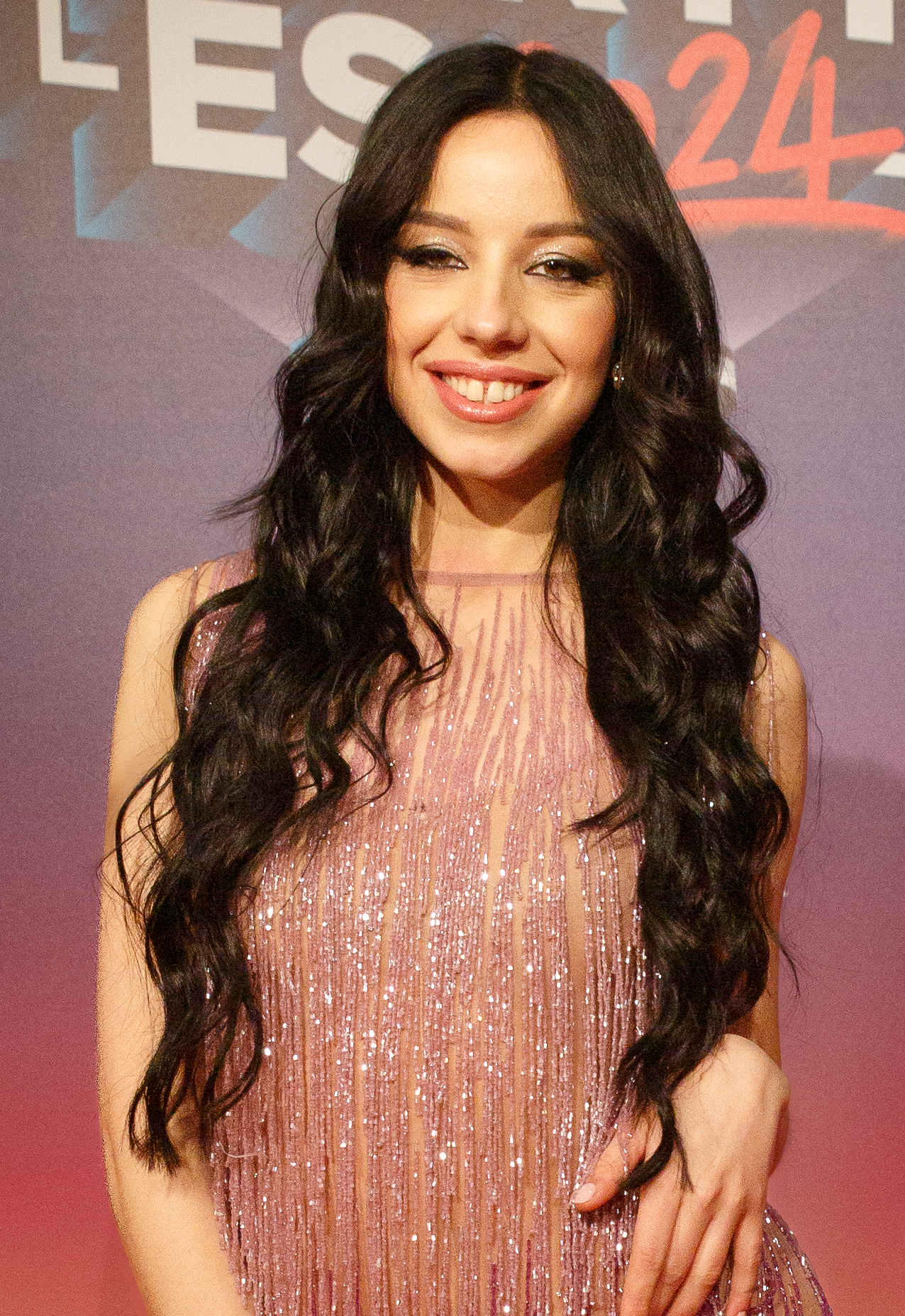
The Voice Kids Malta season 2 coaches (from left to right): Destiny Chukunyere, Gianluca Bezzina, and Sarah Bonnici.

PBS confirmed its intention to participate in the 2025 contest on 23 June 2025, also revealing that it would use the second season of the talent show The Voice Kids, co-produced with Greatt Company Limited and hosted by Maxine Pace, to select its entry, and opened the submission process for interested artists aged between eight and fourteen. All submissions also required participants to enter an original song, which would be used as their Junior Eurovision entry. The coaches were Destiny, Gianluca Bezzina and Sarah Bonnici, all past Eurovision representatives for Malta.

==== Final ====
The final took place on 18 October 2025. The winner was selected through two rounds of voting. In the first round of voting, three artists were selected to proceed to the second round by their respective coaches, i.e. one from each team. In the second round, the public vote selected Eliza Borg of team Destiny as the winner. The titles of the original songs performed in the second round were not disclosed.

Key: Winner

Final – Second round – 18 October 2025
Artist	Draw	Song	Draw	Song
Rachele Maria Nistica	1	"A Million Dreams"	4	N/A
Carly Cachia Arpa	2	"Slipping Through My Fingers"	5	N/A
Eliza Borg	3	"When You Believe"	6	"I Believe"

=== Music video controversy ===
The music video of "I Believe" was met with criticism from fans and local creatives due to the use of artificial intelligence (AI) in its production. More than 220 artists and organisations signed an open letter accusing PBS of "sidelining local talent and disregarding earlier warnings about the unregulated use of AI in cultural production" amid concerns previously raised by Solidarjetà and the Malta Entertainment Industry and Arts Association, with its signatories claiming the broadcaster had ignored their invitation to engage in a discussion about the issue. PBS responded that it had commissioned Hamrun-based agency Space Studios to produce the video, noting that AI models had become "an integral part of modern creative and production workflows" and expressing support for "responsible use of AI as an emerging creative tool".

== At Junior Eurovision ==
The Junior Eurovision Song Contest 2025 took place at the Gymnastic Hall of Olympic City in Tbilisi, Georgia on 13 December 2025. On 4 November 2025, an allocation draw was held to determine the running order of the contest, ahead of which each song was classified into a different category based on its musical style and tempo. Malta was drawn to open the event in position 1, preceding the entry from the Azerbaijan.

=== Voting ===
The same voting system that was introduced in the 2017 edition will be used, where the results will be determined by 50% online voting and 50% jury voting. Every participating broadcaster assembles a national jury that consists of three music industry professionals and two children aged between 10 and 15 who are citizens of the country they represent. The rankings of those jurors are combined to make an overall top ten.

The online voting consists of two phases. The first phase of the online voting will begin on 12 December 2025 when a recap of all the rehearsal performances is shown on the contest's website Junioreurovision.tv before the viewers can vote. After this, voters will also have the option to watch longer one-minute clips from each participant's rehearsal. This first round of voting will end on 13 December at 16:59 CET. The second phase of the online voting will take place during the live show and begin right after the last performance and will be open for 15 minutes. International viewers will be able to vote for three songs. They will also be able to vote for their own country's song. These votes will then be turned into points which will be determined by the percentage of votes received. For example, if a song receives 10% of the votes, it will receive 10% of the available points.

At the end of the show, Malta received 54 points from juries and 38 points from online voting, placing 11th.

Points awarded to Malta
Score	Country
12 points	Armenia
10 points	Italy
8 points	North Macedonia
7 points	
6 points	Poland
5 points	San Marino
4 points	
3 points	Albania; Spain
2 points	Croatia; Cyprus
1 point	Azerbaijan; Ireland; Portugal
Malta received 38 points from the online vote

Points awarded by Malta
Score	Country
12 points	Armenia
10 points	Spain
8 points	Georgia
7 points	Azerbaijan
6 points	Ukraine
5 points	Croatia
4 points	Netherlands
3 points	Poland
2 points	North Macedonia
1 point	France

==== Detailed voting results ====
The following members comprised the Maltese jury:

- Dario Mifsud Bonnici
- Mikael Busuttil Difesa
- Chanel Monseigneur
- Kylee Vassallo
- Trisa Bel Dalli

Detailed voting results from Malta
Draw	Country	Juror A	Juror B	Juror C	Juror D	Juror E	Rank	Points
01	Malta							
02	Azerbaijan	2	5	13	5	15	4	7
03	Croatia	8	3	16	7	7	6	5
04	San Marino	13	9	9	15	9	14	
05	Armenia	3	1	2	2	3	1	12
06	Ukraine	4	10	8	4	12	5	6
07	Ireland	16	15	10	13	8	15	
08	Netherlands	12	7	7	3	13	7	4
09	Poland	6	6	11	9	6	8	3
10	North Macedonia	9	8	3	8	14	9	2
11	Montenegro	15	17	12	11	11	16	
12	Italy	11	11	14	6	4	11	
13	Portugal	14	16	4	16	5	12	
14	Spain	1	13	5	1	2	2	10
15	Georgia	5	4	6	10	1	3	8
16	Cyprus	17	2	15	14	10	13	
17	France	7	14	1	17	17	10	1
18	Albania	10	12	17	12	16	17	
