= Poland in the Junior Eurovision Song Contest 2025 =

- Junior Eurovision Song Contest 2025
- Participating broadcaster: Telewizja Polska (TVP)
- Country: Poland
- Selection process: Internal selection
- Announcement date: Artist: 1 June 2025; Song: 31 October 2025

Competing entry
- Song: "Brightest Light"
- Artist: Marianna Kłos
- Songwriters: Brajan Litkowiec; Jacek Mrówczyński; Jakub Laszuk; Jeremi Siejka; Krzysztof Junak; Paulina Elżbieta Romaniuk-Jasińska

Placement
- Final result: 8th, 139 points

Participation chronology

Poland was represented at the Junior Eurovision Song Contest 2025 with the song "Brightest Light", written by Brajan Litkowiec, Jacek Mrówczyński, Jakub Laszuk, Jeremi Siejka, Krzysztof Junak and Paulina Elżbieta Romaniuk-Jasińska, and performed by Marianna Kłos. The Polish participating broadcaster, Telewizja Polska (TVP), internally selected its entry for the contest.

== Background ==
Prior to the 2025 contest, Poland had participated in the contest eleven times since its first entry in the inaugural 2003 contest. Since then, it has won the contest on two occasions: in 2018 with "Anyone I Want to Be" performed by Roksana Węgiel and in 2019 with "Superhero" performed by Viki Gabor, becoming the first country to win consecutively. The nation opted not to take part in the contest between 2005 and 2015, originally due to unsatisfactory results, though Juliusz Braun, president of TVP between 2011 and 2015, later stated that the broadcaster analysed participation "when proposals appeared" and "decided that such a project is not appropriate for public television. It is drawing children into show business"; "Coś mnie nosi" performed by Kasia Żurawik and "Łap życie" performed by Kwadro both ended up in last place in 2003 and 2004, respectively. The country also placed second in 2021 with "Somebody" performed by Sara James, marking its third and thus far final top five finish. In 2024, Dominik Arim competed for Poland with the song "All Together", which ended up in 12th place out of 17 entries with 61 points.

== Before Junior Eurovision ==
=== Internal selection ===
In December 2024, a tender notification was issued by TVP for production support and multimedia setup for a special edition of the Polish talent show Szansa na sukces, scheduled for autumn 2025, intended to serve as the national final format to select its entry for the Junior Eurovision Song Contest in 2025 for the seventh year running; however, in May 2025, claims surfaced that the broadcaster would instead internally select its entrant for the first time since 2018; this was confirmed on 31 May 2025, with TVP also stating that the Polish representative would be announced the following day, 1 June, during the morning show Pytanie na śniadanie on TVP2, coinciding with celebrations of Children's Day in Poland. The selected artist was revealed to be Marianna Kłos, who had finished runner-up in the eighth season of The Voice Kids earlier in 2025. Her competing entry, "Brightest Light", was released on 31 October 2025.

=== Promotion ===
As part of the promotion of her participation in the contest, Marianna Kłos performed during the final of the sixteenth season of The Voice of Poland on 29 November 2025, broadcast on TVP2. On 3 December 2025, she attended a publicised meeting with several past Polish representatives at the contest, including 2019 winner Viki Gabor. On 10 December 2025, an episode of Jaka to melodia? featuring her performance was aired.

== At Junior Eurovision ==
The Junior Eurovision Song Contest 2025 took place at the Gymnastic Hall of Olympic City in Tbilisi, Georgia on 13 December 2025. On 4 November 2025, an allocation draw was held to determine the running order of the contest, ahead of which each song was classified into a different category based on its musical style and tempo. Poland was drawn to perform in position 9, following the entry from the Netherlands and before the entry from North Macedonia.

In Poland, the event was broadcast on TVP2 and TVP Polonia, as well as online via TVP VOD, with commentary by Artur Orzech.

=== Performance ===
Marianna Kłos took part in technical rehearsals on 7 and 9 December, followed by two dress rehearsals on 12 December. Her performance of "Brightest Light" at the contest is directed by Kamil Staszczyszyn and choreographed by Paulina Przestrzelska, with production and lighting by Jacek Dybowski, Marcin Bania (both of whom previously worked in an analogous position for Poland at the 2025 adult contest) and Marcin Michna, and features four supporting dancers styled as mermaids with full tail costumes as well as blue and marine-toned LED graphics depicting corals and tropical fish. Kłos performs elevated at the centre of the stage, wearing a long white dress with a visual projection cast onto it.

=== Voting ===
The same voting system that was introduced in the 2017 edition will be used, where the results will be determined by 50% online voting and 50% jury voting. Every participating broadcaster assembles a national jury that consists of three music industry professionals and two children aged between 10 and 15 who are citizens of the country they represent. The rankings of those jurors are combined to make an overall top ten.

The online voting consists of two phases. The first phase of the online voting will begin on 12 December 2025 when a recap of all the rehearsal performances is shown on the contest's website Junioreurovision.tv before the viewers can vote. After this, voters will also have the option to watch longer one-minute clips from each participant's rehearsal. This first round of voting will end on 13 December at 16:59 CET. The second phase of the online voting will take place during the live show and begin right after the last performance and will be open for 15 minutes. International viewers will be able to vote for three songs. They will also be able to vote for their own country's song. These votes will then be turned into points which will be determined by the percentage of votes received. For example, if a song receives 10% of the votes, it will receive 10% of the available points.

The spokesperson for the Polish jury was Zosia Wójcik. Poland placed eighth in the final, scoring 139 points; 67 points from the online vote and 72 points from the juries.

Points awarded to Poland
Score	Country
12 points	
10 points	
8 points	Cyprus; Georgia; Spain
7 points	Portugal
6 points	Albania; Azerbaijan; Italy
5 points	North Macedonia
4 points	Ukraine
3 points	Armenia; France; Malta; San Marino
2 points	
1 point	Netherlands; Montenegro
Poland received 67 points from the online vote

Points awarded by Poland
Score	Country
12 points	Georgia
10 points	France
8 points	Armenia
7 points	North Macedonia
6 points	Malta
5 points	San Marino
4 points	Netherlands
3 points	Portugal
2 points	Albania
1 point	Spain

==== Detailed voting results ====
The following members comprised the Polish jury:

- Julia Witulska – child singer, finalist of The Voice Kids 8
- Konrad Szczęsny – journalist, president of OGAE Poland
- Stanisław Karoń – child singer, finalist of The Voice Kids 8
- Tomasz Kukurba – violist, vocalist and multi-instrumentalist
- Viki Gabor – singer, winner of the 2019 contest for Poland

Detailed voting results from Poland
Draw	Country	Juror A	Juror B	Juror C	Juror D	Juror E	Rank	Points
01	Malta	8	11	2	4	8	5	6
02	Azerbaijan	15	15	13	15	17	17	
03	Croatia	14	9	14	5	16	13	
04	San Marino	7	6	8	3	12	6	5
05	Armenia	2	5	3	2	14	3	8
06	Ukraine	9	4	9	13	15	11	
07	Ireland	6	16	7	10	13	12	
08	Netherlands	11	7	10	14	1	7	4
09	Poland							
10	North Macedonia	5	12	4	1	7	4	7
11	Montenegro	12	10	12	11	11	15	
12	Italy	17	13	17	16	10	16	
13	Portugal	3	8	11	7	9	8	3
14	Spain	10	14	6	9	6	10	1
15	Georgia	4	1	1	6	5	1	12
16	Cyprus	16	17	16	12	4	14	
17	France	1	2	5	8	2	2	10
18	Albania	13	3	15	17	3	9	2
