= Spain in the Junior Eurovision Song Contest 2025 =

- Junior Eurovision Song Contest 2025
- Participating broadcaster: Radiotelevisión Española (RTVE)
- Country: Spain
- Selection process: Internal selection
- Announcement date: Artist: 23 July 2025; Song: 6 October 2025

Competing entry
- Song: "Érase una vez (Once Upon a Time)"
- Artist: Gonzalo Pinillos
- Songwriters: Alejandro Martínez; David Parejo; Gonzalo Pinillos; Luis Ramiro

Placement
- Final result: 5th, 152 points

Participation chronology

Spain was represented at the Junior Eurovision Song Contest 2025 with the song "Érase una vez (Once Upon a Time)", written by Alejandro Martínez, David Parejo, Gonzalo Pinillos and Luis Ramiro, and performed by Pinillos himself. The Spanish participating broadcaster, Radiotelevisión Española (RTVE), internally selected its entry for the contest.

== Background ==
Prior to the 2025 contest, Televisión Española (TVE) until 2006, and Radiotelevisión Española (RTVE) since 2019, had participated in the Junior Eurovision Song Contest representing Spain ten times since TVE's first entry in the inaugural 2003 contest. They have won the contest on one occasion: in 2004 with "Antes muerta que sencilla" by María Isabel. RTVE opted not to take part in the contest between 2007 and 2018, with Javier Pons, then-director of TVE, claiming it promoted "stereotypes [they] do not share". Its return proved successful, with its entrants placing third in 2019 and 2020 and second in 2023. In 2024, Chloe DelaRosa competed for Spain with the song "Como la Lola", which ended up in 6th place out of 17 entries with 144 points.

== Before Junior Eurovision ==
=== Internal selection ===
RTVE internally selected its entry for the Junior Eurovision Song Contest 2025. The broadcaster opened a submission process for interested artists aged between nine and fourteen on 27 May 2025. All submissions required participants to enter covers of two songs, with applications open until 30 June 2025. It was also revealed that the Spanish entry for the contest would once again be selected from a pool of songs submitted by "a large group of [both] national and international composers" in a separate process, as had been the case since 2022, and later recorded in September 2025, with suitability to the vocal abilities and style of the selected artist named as the main criteria in the song selection.

At the closing of the application window, 270 applications had been received. Twelve acts were selected to take part in an audition round, held on 21 July 2025 at Prado del Rey in Pozuelo de Alarcón, where the Spanish representative was chosen unanimously by a panel consisting of the head of the Spanish delegation to the contest Ana María Bordas, Benidorm Fest producer César Vallejo, vocal coach Verónica Ferreiro and three other RTVE employees: head of communications María Eizaguirre, executive producer Miriam García Corrales and director Sergio Calderón. On 23 July 2025, Gonzalo Pinillos was announced as the selected entrant; he had previously auditioned to represent the country in 2024. His competing entry, "Érase una vez (Once Upon a Time)", had been selected by 12 September and was released on 6 October; besides Pinillos, its composers had previously authored the Spanish entries in 2023 and 2024.

=== Promotion ===
As part of the promotion of his participation in the contest, Pinillos starred in the 26th edition of the charity campaign Un juguete, una ilusión alongside Chenoa. On 20 October 2025, the music video of his entry was aired ahead of an episode of the prime time show La revuelta on La 1. On 28 November 2025, he was received at the Georgian embassy in Madrid by ambassador Alexander Chkuaseli, where he was presented with a message by 2025 Georgian entrant Anita Abgariani. On 3 December 2025, he performed at a special "farewell party" at the La Mistral bookstore in Madrid.

== At Junior Eurovision ==
The Junior Eurovision Song Contest 2025 took place at the Gymnastic Hall of Olympic City in Tbilisi, Georgia on 13 December 2025. On 4 November 2025, an allocation draw was held to determine the running order of the contest, ahead of which each song was classified into a different category based on its musical style and tempo. Spain was drawn to perform in position 14, following the entry from the Portugal and before the entry from Georgia.

In Spain, the event was broadcast on La 1 with commentary by Julia Varela and Tony Aguilar. In addition, RTVE aired the contest internationally through TVE Internacional as well as online via RTVE Play.

=== Performance ===
Gonzalo Pinillos took part in technical rehearsals on 8 and 10 December, followed by two dress rehearsals on 12 December. His performance of "Érase una vez (Once Upon a Time)" at the contest is staged by Juan Sebastián Domínguez, who previously worked in an analogous position for Spain at the 2024 adult contest, and choreographed by Monica Peña. It features two supporting dancers who perform a theatrical choreography alongside Pinillos, as well as a piano which is later replaced by a circular bookcase prop and references to book characters Asterix, Naruto Uzumaki and Obelix; it had been anticipated that the staging would feature references to the music video.

=== Voting ===
The same voting system that was introduced in the 2017 edition will be used, where the results will be determined by 50% online voting and 50% jury voting. Every participating broadcaster assembles a national jury that consists of three music industry professionals and two children aged between 10 and 15 who are citizens of the country they represent. The rankings of those jurors are combined to make an overall top ten.

The online voting consists of two phases. The first phase of the online voting will begin on 12 December 2025 when a recap of all the rehearsal performances is shown on the contest's website Junioreurovision.tv before the viewers can vote. After this, voters will also have the option to watch longer one-minute clips from each participant's rehearsal. This first round of voting will end on 13 December at 16:59 CET. The second phase of the online voting will take place during the live show and begin right after the last performance and will be open for 15 minutes. International viewers will be able to vote for three songs. They will also be able to vote for their own country's song. These votes will then be turned into points which will be determined by the percentage of votes received. For example, if a song receives 10% of the votes, it will receive 10% of the available points.

The spokesperson for the Spanish jury was Chloe DelaRosa, who represented Spain in the 2024 contest. Spain placed fifth in the final, scoring 152 points; 54 points from the online vote and 98 points from the juries.

Points awarded to Spain
Score	Country
12 points	Portugal
10 points	Croatia; Malta; Netherlands
8 points	France; Italy; San Marino
7 points	Cyprus; Georgia; Ireland
6 points	
5 points	Armenia
4 points	Azerbaijan
3 points	
2 points	
1 point	Poland; Ukraine
Spain received 54 points from the online vote

Points awarded by Spain
Score	Country
12 points	Georgia
10 points	France
8 points	Poland
7 points	Netherlands
6 points	Albania
5 points	North Macedonia
4 points	Armenia
3 points	Malta
2 points	Ukraine
1 point	Ireland

==== Detailed voting results ====
The following members comprised the Spanish jury:

- Daniel Ruiz Gómez
- David Pizarro
- Gio García Alonso
- Rocío Aguilar
- Sandra Valero Azizi

Detailed voting results from Spain
Draw	Country	Juror A	Juror B	Juror C	Juror D	Juror E	Rank	Points
01	Malta	6	8	10	9	8	8	3
02	Azerbaijan	7	13	12	17	17	14	
03	Croatia	9	17	11	13	7	11	
04	San Marino	13	14	13	8	16	16	
05	Armenia	5	7	4	6	15	7	4
06	Ukraine	12	6	8	15	6	9	2
07	Ireland	8	16	15	4	12	10	1
08	Netherlands	2	10	6	7	3	4	7
09	Poland	4	4	5	5	5	3	8
10	North Macedonia	11	5	7	1	14	6	5
11	Montenegro	15	11	9	10	13	12	
12	Italy	14	12	16	11	9	15	
13	Portugal	16	9	14	12	10	13	
14	Spain							
15	Georgia	1	1	3	3	1	1	12
16	Cyprus	17	15	17	16	11	17	
17	France	3	2	1	2	2	2	10
18	Albania	10	3	2	14	4	5	6
