= Armenia in the Junior Eurovision Song Contest 2025 =

- Junior Eurovision Song Contest 2025
- Participating broadcaster: Public Television of Armenia (AMPTV)
- Country: Armenia
- Selection process: Internal selection
- Announcement date: Artist: 21 October 2025; Song: 6 November 2025

Competing entry
- Song: "Brave Heart"
- Artist: Albert
- Songwriters: Anita Hakhverdyan; Lilit Navasardyan

Placement
- Final result: 4th, 175 points

Participation chronology

Armenia was represented at the Junior Eurovision Song Contest 2025 with the song "Brave Heart", written by Anita Hakhverdyan and Lilit Navasardyan, and performed by Albert. The Armenian participating broadcaster, Public Television of Armenia (AMPTV), internally selected its entry for the contest.

== Background ==
Prior to the 2025 contest, Armenia had participated in the contest seventeen times since its first entry in the 2007 contest. Since then, it has won the contest on two occasions: in 2010 with "Mama" performed by Vladimir Arzumanyan and in 2021 with "Qami Qami" performed by Maléna. Armenia had also placed within the top three on ten occasions, more than any other country to have ever competed, and never placed outside of the top nine. The nation opted not to take part in the contest in 2020 due to the martial law imposed on the country as a result of the then-ongoing Second Nagorno-Karabakh War; it was then set to be represented by Maléna. In 2024, Leo competed for Armenia with the song "Cosmic Friend", which ended up in 8th place out of 17 entries with 125 points.

== Before Junior Eurovision ==
=== Internal selection ===
The Armenian entry for the Junior Eurovision Song Contest 2025 was selected internally by AMPTV. The broadcaster opened a submission process for interested artists aged between nine and fourteen on 7 July 2025 to determine its entrant, who would then work with a creative team commissioned by the broadcaster to create the Armenian entry for the contest. All submissions required participants to enter covers of two songs, with applications open until 10 August 2025; shortly before the closing, the deadline was extended until the following 15 August.

Fourteen acts were selected to take part in an audition round in Yerevan between 18 and 24 August 2025; among them was Natalina Safaryan. The acts were judged by a panel which included AMPTV creative producer Anna Tadevosyan, director Arthur Manukyan, Armenian Head of Delegation David Tserunyan, composers Lilit Navasardyan and Nick Egibyan, as well as past Armenian Eurovision representatives Aram Mp3 (2014) and Jaklin Baghdasaryan (2024), which consulted with an international focus group made up of "leading industry experts" in order to choose the Armenian representative, who had been selected by 7 October 2025.

On 21 October 2025, Albert was announced as the selected entrant. He had previously auditioned to represent Armenia in 2023 and 2024, and reached the final of the eleventh season of The Voice Kids in France earlier in 2025. His competing entry, "Brave Heart", was released on 6 November 2025.

=== Promotion and Preparation ===
The Armenian Broadcaster released "Junior Eurovision Diaries" which follows Albert during his preparation for the contest.

== At Junior Eurovision ==
The Junior Eurovision Song Contest 2025 took place at the Gymnastic Hall of Olympic City in Tbilisi, Georgia on 13 December 2025. On 4 November 2025, an allocation draw was held to determine the running order of the contest, ahead of which each song was classified into a different category based on its musical style and tempo. Armenia was drawn to perform in position 5, following the entry from the San Marino and before the entry from Ukraine.

In Armenia, the event was broadcast on First Channel, with commentary by Hamlet Arakelyan and Hrachuhi Utmazyan. A public event was held on the day of the final at Seasons Park Station in Yerevan, featuring a live screening of the show.

=== Voting ===
The same voting system that was introduced in the 2017 edition will be used, where the results will be determined by 50% online voting and 50% jury voting. Every participating broadcaster assembles a national jury that consists of three music industry professionals and two children aged between 10 and 15 who are citizens of the country they represent. The rankings of those jurors are combined to make an overall top ten.

The online voting consists of two phases. The first phase of the online voting will begin on 12 December 2025 when a recap of all the rehearsal performances is shown on the contest's website Junioreurovision.tv before the viewers can vote. After this, voters will also have the option to watch longer one-minute clips from each participant's rehearsal. This first round of voting will end on 13 December at 16:59 CET. The second phase of the online voting will take place during the live show and begin right after the last performance and will be open for 15 minutes. International viewers will be able to vote for three songs. They will also be able to vote for their own country's song. These votes will then be turned into points which will be determined by the percentage of votes received. For example, if a song receives 10% of the votes, it will receive 10% of the available points.

The spokesperson for the Armenian jury was Nare, who represented Armenia in the 2022 contest. Armenia placed fourth in the final, scoring 175 points; 58 points from the online vote and 117 points from the juries.

Points awarded to Armenia
Score	Country
12 points	Georgia; Malta; Ukraine
10 points	Cyprus; France
8 points	Albania; Ireland; Poland
7 points	Croatia
6 points	Montenegro; Netherlands; Portugal
5 points	
4 points	San Marino; Spain
3 points	Azerbaijan
2 points	
1 point	North Macedonia
Armenia received 58 points from the online vote

Points awarded by Armenia
Score	Country
12 points	Malta
10 points	North Macedonia
8 points	Georgia
7 points	Netherlands
6 points	Ukraine
5 points	Spain
4 points	France
3 points	Poland
2 points	Portugal
1 point	Croatia

==== Detailed voting results ====
The following members comprised the Armenian jury:

- Naire Stepanyan
- Nane Andreasyan
- Natali Safaryan
- Nick Egibyan
- Pargev Vardanyan (Parg)

Detailed voting results from Armenia
Draw	Country	Juror A	Juror B	Juror C	Juror D	Juror E	Rank	Points
01	Malta	1	2	2	1	2	1	12
02	Azerbaijan	17	16	12	14	17	17	
03	Croatia	13	12	9	6	12	10	1
04	San Marino	12	14	11	15	13	15	
05	Armenia							
06	Ukraine	4	4	6	8	8	5	6
07	Ireland	6	13	13	13	16	12	
08	Netherlands	5	7	4	2	1	4	7
09	Poland	8	9	5	9	11	8	3
10	North Macedonia	2	1	3	3	9	2	10
11	Montenegro	15	17	15	12	5	11	
12	Italy	9	15	16	17	14	16	
13	Portugal	14	6	14	16	6	9	2
14	Spain	7	10	7	5	3	6	5
15	Georgia	3	5	1	4	4	3	8
16	Cyprus	16	11	10	10	10	13	
17	France	10	3	8	7	7	7	4
18	Albania	11	8	17	11	15	14	
