= Georgia in the Junior Eurovision Song Contest 2025 =

- Junior Eurovision Song Contest 2025
- Participating broadcaster: Georgian Public Broadcaster (GPB)
- Country: Georgia
- Selection process: Artist: Ranina 2025; Song: Internal selection
- Selection date: Artist: 1 November 2025; Song: 7 November 2025

Competing entry
- Song: "Shine Like a Star"
- Artist: Anita Abgariani
- Songwriters: Giorgi Kukhianidze; Mariam Ghvaladze

Placement
- Final result: 3rd, 176 points

Participation chronology

Georgia was represented at the Junior Eurovision Song Contest 2025 with the song "Shine Like a Star", written by Giorgi Kukhianidze and Mariam Ghvaladze, and performed by Anita Abgariani. The Georgian participating broadcaster, Georgian Public Broadcaster (GPB), selected Abgariani as its entrant through the show Ranina, while the song "Shine Like a Star" was internally selected.

In addition, GPB was also the host broadcaster and staged the event at the Gymnastic Hall of Olympic City in Tbilisi after winning the previous edition with the song "To My Mom" by Andria Putkaradze.

== Background ==
Prior to the 2025 contest, Georgia had participated in the contest eighteen times since its first entry in the 2007 contest; before their first appearance, Georgia was set to take part in 2005, but was forced to withdraw as GPB would not become a full EBU member until after the deadline to confirm participation. Since then, it has won the contest on four occasions: in 2008 with "Bzz.." performed by Bzikebi, in 2011 with "Candy Music" performed by Candy, in 2016 with "Mzeo" performed by Mariam Mamadashvili and in 2024 with "To My Mom" performed by Andria Putkaradze, making it the country with the most wins in the contest's history.

== Before Junior Eurovision ==
=== Ranina ===
For the eighth year in a row, Georgia will use an original children's talent show format, Ranina (Georgian: რანინა), as the selection method for their artist. GPB opened applications on 28 November 2024 and held castings in December to select the contestants. The final list of artists was revealed on 20 February 2025.

Classical pianist Datuna Aladashvili will remain the main host of the eighth season of Ranina, a role that he has held since the first season. During the shows, former contestant Vache Ghviniashvili will join him at the studio.

The format of Ranina remains unchanged from previous seasons, as all ten contestants compete across four thematic tours in the main round, where they perform accompanied by a live orchestra and famous singers or bands from Georgia. Each tour is divided in two episodes. Each time that they perform, the artists are rated by a three-member jury, who can award up to ten points to each artist in four categories: vocals, performance, artistry and involvement. All the scores are added up and, at the end of the fourth tour, the five artists with the highest scores advance to the semi-final. In the semi-final, the five artists are rated by the jury following the same system to select three finalists. The winner of the final will also chosen by a three-member jury.

List of contestants
Name	Age (Note: As of 20 February 2025, the day when the list of contestants was released by GPB.)	Main round scores					Semi-final	Final	Place
Name	Age	Tour 1	Tour 2	Tour 3	Tour 4	Combined score	Semi-final	Final	Place
Anita Abgariani (ანიტა აბგარიანი)	10 years old	120	120	120	120	480	Qualified	Winner	1
Lazare Kapanadze (ლაზარე კაპანაძე)	11 years old	120	120	120	120	480	Qualified	Finalist	2
Sandro Abesadze (სანდრო აბესაძე)	10 years old	120	120	119	120	479	Qualified	Finalist	2
Gabriel Bodaveli (გაბრიელ ბოდაველი)	12 years old	120	118	120	120	478	Eliminated	Did not qualify	4
Lile Mchedlishvili (ლილე მჭედლიშვილი)	8 years old	120	117	120	119	476	Eliminated	Did not qualify	4
Mariam Muzashvili (მარიამ მუზაშვილი)	9 years old	120	116	120	120	476	Eliminated	Did not qualify	4
Barbare Sanikidze (ბარბარე სანიკიძე)	11 years old	120	120	118	117	475	Did not qualify		7
Demetre Maisuradze (დემეტრე მაისურაძე)	10 years old	120	117	120	118	475	Did not qualify		7
Sesili Lemonjava (სესილი ლემონჯავა)	11 years old	120	118	118	118	474	Did not qualify		9
Nia Lashkhia (ნია ლაშხია)	11 years old	120	116	120	117	473	Did not qualify		10

==== Tour 1 ====
In the first tour, the ten contestants covered Georgian classic songs accompanied by group Ezidk'atsa and Teat'raluris K'vart'et'i (Georgian: ეზიდკაცა და თეატრალურის კვარტეტი). The first episode of the tour featured Sopo Khalvashi – who represented Georgia in the Eurovision Song Contest 2007 – as guest juror.

Show 1 – 20 September 2025 (Guest artist: Ezidk'atsa and Teat'raluris K'vart'et'i)
R/O	Artist	Song	Jury scores (Note: The categories for the scores, from left to right, are vocals, performance, artistry and involvement.)			Final score
R/O	Artist	Song	D. Evgenidze	N. Metonidze	S. Khalvashi	Final score
1	Lile Mchedlishvili	"Ar madzinebs" "არ მაძინებს"	40 (10 | 10 | 10 | 10)	40 (10 | 10 | 10 | 10)	40 (10 | 10 | 10 | 10)	120
2	Demetre Maisuradze	"Gza siarulma dalia" "გზა სიარულმა დალია"	40 (10 | 10 | 10 | 10)	40 (10 | 10 | 10 | 10)	40 (10 | 10 | 10 | 10)	120
3	Sesili Lemonjava	"Gamodi" "გამოდი"	40 (10 | 10 | 10 | 10)	40 (10 | 10 | 10 | 10)	40 (10 | 10 | 10 | 10)	120
4	Barbare Sanikidze	"Mze chemi k'argi megobaria" "მზე ჩემი კარგი მეგობარია"	40 (10 | 10 | 10 | 10)	40 (10 | 10 | 10 | 10)	40 (10 | 10 | 10 | 10)	120
5	Gabriel Bodaveli	"Gazapkhuli maints mova" "გაზაფხული მაინც მოვა"	40 (10 | 10 | 10 | 10)	40 (10 | 10 | 10 | 10)	40 (10 | 10 | 10 | 10)	120

Show 2 – 21 September 2025 (Guest artist: Ezidk'atsa and Teat'raluris K'vart'et'i)
R/O	Artist	Song	Jury scores			Final score
R/O	Artist	Song	D. Evgenidze	N. Metonidze	S. Khalvashi	Final score
1	Mariam Muzashvili	"Chiraghdnebi" "ჩირაღდნები"	40 (10 | 10 | 10 | 10)	40 (10 | 10 | 10 | 10)	40 (10 | 10 | 10 | 10)	120
2	Lazare Kapandze	"Sakartvelo chemi guli" "საქართველო ჩემი გული"	40 (10 | 10 | 10 | 10)	40 (10 | 10 | 10 | 10)	40 (10 | 10 | 10 | 10)	120
3	Nia Lashkhia	"Sakartvelo lamazo" "საქართველო ლამაზო"	40 (10 | 10 | 10 | 10)	40 (10 | 10 | 10 | 10)	40 (10 | 10 | 10 | 10)	120
4	Sandro Abesadze	"Mgzavruli" "მგზავრული"	40 (10 | 10 | 10 | 10)	40 (10 | 10 | 10 | 10)	40 (10 | 10 | 10 | 10)	120
5	Anita Abgariani	"Mzeo tibatvisa" "მზეო თიბათვისა"	40 (10 | 10 | 10 | 10)	40 (10 | 10 | 10 | 10)	40 (10 | 10 | 10 | 10)	120

==== Tour 2 ====
The second tour was themed as an international tour: the contestants performed songs in ten different languages chosen by Natia Okruashvili. The second episode of the tour featured Bibi Kvachadze as guest juror.

Show 3 – 27 September 2025
R/O	Artist	Song	Jury scores			Final score
R/O	Artist	Song	D. Evgenidze	N. Metonidze	B. Kvachadze	Final score
1	Gabriel Bodaveli	"Tez Gəl"	40 (10 | 10 | 10 | 10)	40 (10 | 10 | 10 | 10)	38 (10 | 10 | 9 | 9)	118
2	Sesili Lemonjava	"Les Champs-Elysées"	40 (10 | 10 | 10 | 10)	39 (10 | 9 | 10 | 10)	39 (9 | 10 | 10 | 10)	118
3	Barbare Sanikidze	"Rosna livada" "Росна ливада"	40 (10 | 10 | 10 | 10)	40 (10 | 10 | 10 | 10)	40 (10 | 10 | 10 | 10)	120
4	Lile Mchedlishvili	"Samba de uma nota só"	40 (10 | 10 | 10 | 10)	39 (9 | 10 | 10 | 10)	38 (9 | 9 | 10 | 10)	117
5	Demetre Maisuradze	"Every Breath You Take"	39 (10 | 9 | 10 | 10)	38 (10 | 9 | 9 | 10)	40 (10 | 10 | 10 | 10)	117

Show 4 – 28 September 2025
R/O	Artist	Song	Jury scores			Final score
R/O	Artist	Song	D. Evgenidze	N. Metonidze	B. Kvachadze	Final score
1	Anita Abgariani	"Luck Be a Lady"	40 (10 | 10 | 10 | 10)	40 (10 | 10 | 10 | 10)	40 (10 | 10 | 10 | 10)	120
2	Sandro Abesadze	"Veinte anos"	40 (10 | 10 | 10 | 10)	40 (10 | 10 | 10 | 10)	40 (10 | 10 | 10 | 10)	120
3	Nia Lashkhia	"Cantabria"	39 (10 | 9 | 10 | 10)	38 (10 | 9 | 9 | 10)	39 (10 | 10 | 9 | 10)	116
4	Mariam Muzashvili	"Eli, Eli" "אֵלִי, אֵלִי"	39 (10 | 9 | 10 | 10)	39 (10 | 9 | 10 | 10)	38 (10 | 9 | 9 | 10)	116
5	Lazare Kapandze	"Kanchum em (Hanina)" "Կանչում եմ (Հանինա)"	40 (10 | 10 | 10 | 10)	40 (10 | 10 | 10 | 10)	40 (10 | 10 | 10 | 10)	120

==== Tour 3 ====
In the third tour, the ten contestants performed traditional songs alongside the ensemble Shavnabada. This tour's shows featured Mikheil Chikviladze as guest juror.

Show 5 – 11 October 2025 (Guest artist: Shavnabada)
R/O	Artist	Song	Jury scores			Final score
R/O	Artist	Song	D. Evgenidze	N. Metonidze	M. Chikviladze	Final score
1	Sesili Lemonjava	"Ia bat’onebi" "ია ბატონები"	39 (10 | 9 | 10 | 10)	39 (10 | 9 | 10 | 10)	40 (10 | 10 | 10 | 10)	118
2	Demetre Maisuradze	"Perad-shind" "ფერად-შინდ"	40 (10 | 10 | 10 | 10)	40 (10 | 10 | 10 | 10)	40 (10 | 10 | 10 | 10)	120
3	Lile Mchedlishvili	"Sulis q’vavilo" "სულის ყვავილო"	40 (10 | 10 | 10 | 10)	40 (10 | 10 | 10 | 10)	40 (10 | 10 | 10 | 10)	120
4	Barbare Sanikidze	"Apkhazuri sakorts’ilo" "აფხაზური საქორწილო"	39 (10 | 9 | 10 | 10)	40 (10 | 10 | 10 | 10)	39 (10 | 10 | 10 | 9)	118
5	Gabriel Bodaveli (with Sandro Gurginadze)	"Shilduri „chak’rulo“" "შილდური „ჩაკრულო“"	40 (10 | 10 | 10 | 10)	40 (10 | 10 | 10 | 10)	40 (10 | 10 | 10 | 10)	120

Show 6 – 12 October 2025 (Guest artist: Shavnabada)
R/O	Artist	Song	Jury scores			Final score
R/O	Artist	Song	D. Evgenidze	N. Metonidze	M. Chikviladze	Final score
1	Sandro Abesadze (with Anastasia Vasadze)	"Chemi guli, sheni guli" "ჩემი გული, შენი გული"	40 (10 | 10 | 10 | 10)	39 (10 | 10 | 10 | 9)	40 (10 | 10 | 10 | 10)	119
2	Mariam Muzashvili	"Iebi" "იები"	40 (10 | 10 | 10 | 10)	40 (10 | 10 | 10 | 10)	40 (10 | 10 | 10 | 10)	120
3	Lazare Kapandze	"Rach’uli sakhumaro" "რაჭული სახუმარო"	40 (10 | 10 | 10 | 10)	40 (10 | 10 | 10 | 10)	40 (10 | 10 | 10 | 10)	120
4	Nia Lashkhia	"Mi re satsodali" "მი რე საცოდალი"	40 (10 | 10 | 10 | 10)	40 (10 | 10 | 10 | 10)	40 (10 | 10 | 10 | 10)	120
5	Anita Abgariani (with Mate Martiashvili)	"Akedana da shenamde" "აქედანა და შენამდე"	40 (10 | 10 | 10 | 10)	40 (10 | 10 | 10 | 10)	40 (10 | 10 | 10 | 10)	120

==== Tour 4 ====
In the last tour, the ten contestants performed Georgian greatest hits rearranged by Natia Okruashvili. This tour's shows featured Giorgi Asanishvili as guest juror.

At the end of Show 8, the semi-finalists were announced. The five participants who collected the most points throughout the four tours advanced to the next round. They are Anita Abgariani, Lazare Kapandze, Sandro Abesadze, Gabriel Bodaveli, Lile Mchedlishvili and Mariam Muzashvili. Lile Mchedlishvili and Mariam Muzashvili both took 5th place with the same score, so both of them qualified to the semi-final round.

Show 7 – 18 October 2025
R/O	Artist	Song	Jury scores			Final score
R/O	Artist	Song	D. Evgenidze	N. Metonidze	G. Asanishvili	Final score
1	Barbare Sanikidze	"Ias utkhari t’urpasa" "იას უთხარი ტურფასა"	39 (10 | 9 | 10 | 10)	39 (10 | 9 | 10 | 10)	39 (10 | 9 | 10 | 10)	117
2	Demetre Maisuradze	"Amodi mzeo" "ამოდი მზეო"	39 (10 | 9 | 10 | 10)	40 (10 | 10 | 10 | 10)	39 (9 | 10 | 10 | 10)	118
3	Lile Mchedlishvili	"Rotsa dauberavs nazi sio (Aleluia)" "როცა დაუბერავს ნაზი სიო (ალელუია)"	40 (10 | 10 | 10 | 10)	40 (10 | 10 | 10 | 10)	39 (9 | 10 | 10 | 10)	119
4	Gabriel Bodaveli	"Shuaghamis serenada" "შუაღამის სერენადა"	40 (10 | 10 | 10 | 10)	40 (10 | 10 | 10 | 10)	40 (10 | 10 | 10 | 10)	120
5	Sesili Lemonjava	"Herio" "ჰერიო"	39 (10 | 9 | 10 | 10)	39 (9 | 10 | 10 | 10)	40 (10 | 10 | 10 | 10)	118

Show 8 – 19 October 2025
R/O	Artist	Song	Jury scores			Final score
R/O	Artist	Song	D. Evgenidze	N. Metonidze	G. Asanishvili	Final score
1	Anita Abgariani	"Berik’aoba" "ბერიკაობა"	40 (10 | 10 | 10 | 10)	40 (10 | 10 | 10 | 10)	40 (10 | 10 | 10 | 10)	120
2	Lazare Kapandze	"Tsisk’ara" "ცისკარა"	40 (10 | 10 | 10 | 10)	40 (10 | 10 | 10 | 10)	40 (10 | 10 | 10 | 10)	120
3	Nia Lashkhia	"Satsek’vao moedanze" "საცეკვაო მოედანზე"	39 (10 | 9 | 10 | 10)	39 (10 | 9 | 10 | 10)	39 (10 | 9 | 10 | 10)	117
4	Sandro Abesadze	"Bich’ik’os simghera" "ბიჭიკოს სიმღერა"	40 (10 | 10 | 10 | 10)	40 (10 | 10 | 10 | 10)	40 (10 | 10 | 10 | 10)	120
5	Mariam Muzashvili	"Sdzinavs t’bas" "სძინავს ტბას"	40 (10 | 10 | 10 | 10)	40 (10 | 10 | 10 | 10)	40 (10 | 10 | 10 | 10)	120

==== Semi-final ====
The semi-final took place on 25 October 2025. The six remaining contestants performed famous Georgian songs alongside the vocal septet The Bookmarks made up of former Ranina contestants Anastasia Garsevanishvili, Barbare Imnadze, Marita Khvedelidze, Nini Gazdeliani, Kato Chkaureli, Rati Gelovani and Soso Chachua. Buka Kartozia, director of The Bookmarks, acted as the rotating juror in this episode next to Evgenidze and Metonidze.

Semi-final – 25 October 2025 (Guest artists: The Bookmarks)
R/O	Artist	Song	Result
1	Lile Mchedlishvili	"Gamodi" "გამოდი"	Eliminated
2	Mariam Muzashvili	"Samshoblo" "სამშობლო"	Eliminated
3	Gabriel Bodaveli	"Ap’rili modis" "აპრილი მოდის"	Eliminated
4	Lazare Kapanadze	"Khevsuruli balada" "ხევსურული ბალადა"	Qualified
5	Anita Abgariani	"Romansi" "რომანსი"	Qualified
6	Sandro Abesadze	"O, rero rero" "ო, რერო რერო"	Qualified

==== Final ====
The final took place on 1 November. The three artists that qualified from the semi-final covered Georgian poems originally written by the poet Akaki Tsereteli, as arranged by the composer Zviad Bolkvadze. Austrian creative director and scenographer Marvin Dietman acted as the rotating juror in this episode next to Evgenidze and Metonidze. In addition to the competing entries, the guest performers included Junior Eurovision Song Contest 2024 winner Andria Putkaradze with "To My Mom", as well as a group performance by the finalists of Tsereteli’s poem "Santelivit davdnebi".

Ten-year-old Armenian-Georgian singer Anita Abgariani was later revealed as the winner chosen by the jury, earning the right to represent Georgia at the contest.

Final – 1 November 2025 (Guest artists: The Bookmarks)
R/O	Artist	Song	Result
1	Sandro Abesadze	"Chemo tsitsinatela" "ჩემო ციცინათელა"	Finalist
2	Lazare Kapanadze	"Sulik’o" "სულიკო"	Finalist
3	Anita Abgariani	"Chongurs simebi gavubi" "ჩონგურს სიმები გავუბი"	Winner

== At Junior Eurovision ==
The Junior Eurovision Song Contest 2025 took place at the Gymnastic Hall of Olympic City in Tbilisi, Georgia on 13 December 2025. Georgia performed fifteenth preceding Cyprus and after Spain.

=== Voting ===
The same voting system that was introduced in the 2017 edition will be used, where the results will be determined by 50% online voting and 50% jury voting. Every participating broadcaster assembles a national jury that consists of three music industry professionals and two children aged between 10 and 15 who are citizens of the country they represent. The rankings of those jurors are combined to make an overall top ten.

The online voting consists of two phases. The first phase of the online voting will begin on 12 December 2025 when a recap of all the rehearsal performances is shown on the contest's website Junioreurovision.tv before the viewers can vote. After this, voters will also have the option to watch longer one-minute clips from each participant's rehearsal. This first round of voting will end on 13 December at 16:59 CET. The second phase of the online voting will take place during the live show and begin right after the last performance and will be open for 15 minutes. International viewers will be able to vote for three songs. They will also be able to vote for their own country's song. These votes will then be turned into points which will be determined by the percentage of votes received. For example, if a song receives 10% of the votes, it will receive 10% of the available points.

At the end of the show, Georgia received 121 points from juries and 55 points from online voting, placing 3rd.

Points awarded to Georgia
Score	Country
12 points	Ireland; Poland; Spain
10 points	Albania; Portugal
8 points	Armenia; Azerbaijan; Malta; Netherlands
7 points	Italy; North Macedonia
6 points	Cyprus
5 points	Croatia
4 points	
3 points	
2 points	France; Montenegro; San Marino; Ukraine
1 point	
Georgia received 55 points from the online vote

Points awarded by Georgia
Score	Country
12 points	Armenia
10 points	France
8 points	Poland
7 points	Spain
6 points	Ukraine
5 points	Albania
4 points	North Macedonia
3 points	Portugal
2 points	San Marino
1 point	Croatia

==== Detailed voting results ====
The following members comprised the Georgian jury:

- Giorgi Shashviashvili
- Roman Rtskhiladze
- Anastasia Masurashvili
- Ketevan Javakhishvili
- Mariam Shengelia

Detailed voting results from Georgia
Draw	Country	Juror A	Juror B	Juror C	Juror D	Juror E	Rank	Points
01	Malta	10	15	10	10	13	12	
02	Azerbaijan	17	17	17	17	17	17	
03	Croatia	14	8	14	9	9	10	1
04	San Marino	12	6	12	11	10	9	2
05	Armenia	1	1	2	2	1	1	12
06	Ukraine	4	4	4	4	5	5	6
07	Ireland	15	9	15	14	14	15	
08	Netherlands	7	10	9	15	15	11	
09	Poland	3	3	3	3	3	3	8
10	North Macedonia	8	11	6	7	7	7	4
11	Montenegro	16	12	16	16	16	16	
12	Italy	11	13	13	13	11	13	
13	Portugal	9	14	8	8	8	8	3
14	Spain	5	2	5	5	4	4	7
15	Georgia							
16	Cyprus	13	16	11	12	12	14	
17	France	2	5	1	1	2	2	10
18	Albania	6	7	7	6	6	6	5
