= Netherlands in the Junior Eurovision Song Contest 2025 =

- Junior Eurovision Song Contest 2025
- Participating broadcaster: AVROTROS
- Country: Netherlands
- Selection process: Junior Songfestival 2025
- Selection date: 20 September 2025

Competing entry
- Song: "Freeze"
- Artist: Meadow
- Songwriters: Daniel van der Molen; Elke Tiel; Stas Swaczyna

Placement
- Final result: 10th, 93 points

Participation chronology

The Netherlands was represented at the Junior Eurovision Song Contest 2025 with the song "Freeze", written by Daniel van der Molen, Elke Tiel and Stas Swaczyna, and performed by Meadow. The Dutch participating broadcaster, AVROTROS, organised the national final Junior Songfestival 2025 in order to select its entry for the contest.

== Background ==
Prior to the 2025 contest, the Netherlands had participated in the contest twenty-two times since its first entry in the inaugural 2003 contest. Since then, the country has won the contest on one occasion in 2009 with the song "Click Clack" performed by Ralf Mackenbach. The Netherlands is the only country to have taken part in every edition of the contest. Since 2014, as the result of a merger between the AVRO – which had previously been in charge of the Netherlands' participation in the contest – and TROS into the current AVROTROS, it is the latter who participates representing the Netherlands. In 2024, Stay Tuned competed for the Netherlands with the song "Music", which ended up in 10th place out of 17 entries with 91 points.

== Before Junior Eurovision ==
=== Junior Songfestival 2025 ===
Junior Songfestival 2025 was the twenty-second edition of Junior Songfestival, the national final format developed by AVROTROS to select Dutch entries for the Junior Eurovision Song Contest. The event was held on 20 September 2025 at the RTM Stage in Rotterdam, and was hosted by Matheu and Stefania. The show was broadcast on NPO Zapp via NPO 3, as well as on the broadcaster's streaming platform NPO Start.

==== Format ====
The selection took place in four stages: the received applications were first assessed by an expert committee; 72 were selected to be performed at an audition round (split into a workshop and a final audition), excerpts of which were published to the competition's official YouTube channel on 4 and 18 April, and 2 and 16 May 2025; at the workshop, the singers were split into four groups and had the opportunity to work with vocal coaches and choreographers, after which a number of artists advanced to the final audition, where a jury selected the eleven finalists, who were later grouped into four acts, each of them being assigned original songs written by established songwriting groups; at the final, which was held on 20 September 2025, the winner was determined by a combination of votes from an kids jury (traditionally made up of past Junior Songfestival participants), a professional jury (made up of industry professionals) and an online vote – each awarding sets of 8–10 and 12 points – with the latter taking precedence in the event of a tie.

==== Competing entries ====
The submission process for interested artists aged between nine and fourteen was open between 21 September 2024 and 31 January 2025. At the closing of the application window, over 1,200 applications had been received. All submissions required participants to enter one cover song. An expert committee reviewed the received submissions and selected 72 of them to proceed to the audition round. The first six finalists were revealed on 30 May 2025 and the remaining five finalists were revealed on 6 June 2025, while the groupings were unveiled on 14 June 2025. One-minute snippets of the songs published between 2 and 6 July 2025, with the songs released daily between 8 and 11 July 2025.

Artist	Song	Songwriter(s)
Coco and Tove	"Strong Girl Summer"	Julian Vahle; Roxy Dekker
Iconic	"Don't Touch"	Nienke van der Velden; Rens Koppe; Tjeerd van Zanen
Level Up	"Rule the World"	Jermain van der Bogt; Willem Laseroms
Meadow	"Freeze"	Daniel van der Molen; Elke Tiel; Stas Swaczyna

==== Final ====
The final took place on 20 September 2025. The kids jury panel consisted of Junior Songfestival 2024 participants Stay Tuned and Veronika, while the professional jury panel, the members of which also provided feedback in regards to the performances during the show, consisted of singers Billy Dans, Hannah Mae and Sera. In addition to the competing entries, the finalists performed a common song titled "Spotlights" and an anthem of the anti-bullying campaign Stip it titled "We Got the Power". Fourteen-year-old Meadow was declared the winner with the song "Freeze".

Final – 20 September 2025
R/O	Artist	Song	Kids jury	Prof. jury	Online vote	Total	Place
1	Level Up	"Rule the World"	9	8	10	27	3
2	Coco and Tove	"Strong Girl Summer"	8	9	9	26	4
3	Iconic	"Don't Touch"	10	10	8	28	2
4	Meadow	"Freeze"	12	12	12	36	1

=== Promotion ===
As part of the promotion of her participation in the contest, Meadow performed at Het Grote Junior Songfestival Concert, a retrospective celebration event with performances by past participants of Junior Songfestival, in Rotterdam on 12 October 2025.

== At Junior Eurovision ==
The Junior Eurovision Song Contest 2025 took place at the Gymnastic Hall of Olympic City in Tbilisi, Georgia on 13 December 2025. On 4 November 2025, an allocation draw was held to determine the running order of the contest, ahead of which each song was classified into a different category based on its musical style and tempo. The Netherlands was drawn to perform in position 8, following the entry from the Ireland and before the entry from Poland.

=== Voting ===
The same voting system that was introduced in the 2017 edition will be used, where the results will be determined by 50% online voting and 50% jury voting. Every participating broadcaster assembles a national jury that consists of three music industry professionals and two children aged between 10 and 15 who are citizens of the country they represent. The rankings of those jurors are combined to make an overall top ten.

The online voting consists of two phases. The first phase of the online voting will begin on 12 December 2025 when a recap of all the rehearsal performances is shown on the contest's website Junioreurovision.tv before the viewers can vote. After this, voters will also have the option to watch longer one-minute clips from each participant's rehearsal. This first round of voting will end on 13 December at 16:59 CET. The second phase of the online voting will take place during the live show and begin right after the last performance and will be open for 15 minutes. International viewers will be able to vote for three songs. They will also be able to vote for their own country's song. These votes will then be turned into points which will be determined by the percentage of votes received. For example, if a song receives 10% of the votes, it will receive 10% of the available points.

At the end of the show, the Netherlands received 47 points from the national juries and 46 points from the online vote, finishing in 10th place overall with 93 points.

Points awarded to Netherlands
Score	Country
12 points	
10 points	
8 points	
7 points	Armenia; Spain; Ukraine
6 points	San Marino
5 points	France; Italy
4 points	Malta; Poland
3 points	
2 points	
1 point	Albania; Cyprus
Netherlands received 46 points from the online vote

Points awarded by Netherlands
Score	Country
12 points	France
10 points	Spain
8 points	Georgia
7 points	Italy
6 points	Armenia
5 points	Albania
4 points	Ukraine
3 points	Azerbaijan
2 points	Portugal
1 point	Poland

==== Detailed voting results ====
The following members comprised the Dutch jury:

- Bas Wesseling
- Niek Mensing
- Ruben Philips
- Nienke van der Velden
- Rachel Traets

Detailed voting results from Netherlands
Draw	Country	Juror A	Juror B	Juror C	Juror D	Juror E	Rank	Points
01	Malta	12	13	10	5	10	14	
02	Azerbaijan	1	11	16	16	6	8	3
03	Croatia	11	14	17	14	14	16	
04	San Marino	9	3	14	11	16	11	
05	Armenia	10	15	3	1	7	5	6
06	Ukraine	5	9	2	8	11	7	4
07	Ireland	17	8	11	6	9	13	
08	Netherlands							
09	Poland	13	6	13	7	5	10	1
10	North Macedonia	14	10	4	10	12	12	
11	Montenegro	16	16	12	15	15	17	
12	Italy	2	7	5	13	3	4	7
13	Portugal	3	12	6	9	13	9	2
14	Spain	4	1	9	4	4	2	10
15	Georgia	15	5	7	2	1	3	8
16	Cyprus	6	17	15	17	17	15	
17	France	8	2	1	3	8	1	12
18	Albania	7	4	8	12	2	6	5
