= Azerbaijan in the Junior Eurovision Song Contest 2025 =

- Junior Eurovision Song Contest 2025
- Participating broadcaster: İctimai Televiziya (İTV)
- Country: Azerbaijan
- Selection process: Internal selection
- Announcement date: Artist: 23 September 2025; Song: 30 October 2025

Competing entry
- Song: "Miau miau"
- Artist: Yağmur
- Songwriters: Diana Hajiyeva; Hafiz Bakhish; Mila Miles; Rustam Rzayev

Placement
- Final result: 15th, 66 points

Participation chronology

Azerbaijan was represented at the Junior Eurovision Song Contest 2025 with "Miau miau", written by Diana Hajiyeva, Hafiz Bakhish, Mila Miles and Rustam Rzayev, and performed by Yağmur. The Azerbaijani participating broadcaster, İctimai Televiziya (İTV), internally selected its entry for the contest.

== Background ==
Prior to the 2025 contest, Azerbaijan had participated in the contest four times since its first entry in the 2012 contest; before their first appearance, Azerbaijan was set to take part in 2008, however withdrew before the contest was held as the broadcaster "could not find a suitable act". The country entered the competition twice before 2014, when it opted not to take part in the contest and did not return until a one-off appearance in 2018. In 2021, Sona Azizova competed for Azerbaijan upon its return with the song "One of Those Days", which ended up in 5th place out of 19 entries with 151 points, marking its best result in the contest to date. Despite member of the Azerbaijani delegation Eldar Rasulov stating that the nation must continue to participate "no matter where the contest is held", in reference to its hostile relations with Armenia, the host country of the 2022 contest, the country opted not to take part in the contest between 2022 and 2024 (later due to a lack of interest, costs of participation and low viewing figures).

== Before Junior Eurovision ==
Upon confirming their participation in the 2025 contest, İTV opened a submission process for interested artists aged between nine and fourteen on 16 August 2025. All submissions required participants to enter covers of two songs (one in Azerbaijani and one in a foreign language), with applications open through WhatsApp until 31 August 2025. The broadcaster also contacted the Ministry of Culture to submit a list of eligible singers who have participated in international contests and festivals, with those on the list potentially being directly invited to participate.

At the closing of the application window, over 60 applications had been received. Fifteen acts were selected to take part in an audition round in Baku on 12 September 2025, where the Azerbaijani representative was chosen by a panel consisting of 2020 and 2021 Azerbaijani Eurovision representative Samira Efendi, singers Govhar Hasanzade, Siyavush Karimi and Vuqar Jamalzade, composer Yashar Bakhish and Azerbaijan State Academic Theatre of Musical Comedy chief director Javid Imamverdiyev. On 23 September 2025, twelve-year-old Yagmur Nasrullayeva (Azerbaijani: Yağmur Nəsrullayeva), known mononymously as Yağmur, was announced as the selected entrant during a presentation event held in the presence of Azerbaijani head of delegation Nurlana Jafarova and head of media Turab Teymurov, as well as the Eurovision advisor to the General Director of İTV, Maksim Tsurkov; five of the six members of the panel ranked Nasrullayeva within their top five, with three members ranking her first and one member ranking her second.

Her competing entry, "Miau miau", had been selected by 10 October and was expected to be released in November; this was ultimately not the case and the reveal was scheduled for 30 October.

== At Junior Eurovision ==
The Junior Eurovision Song Contest 2025 took place at the Gymnastic Hall of Olympic City in Tbilisi, Georgia on 13 December 2025. On 4 November 2025, an allocation draw was held to determine the running order of the contest, ahead of which each song was classified into a different category based on its musical style and tempo. Azerbaijan was drawn to perform in position 2, following the entry from the Malta and before the entry from Croatia.

=== Performance ===
Yağmur took part in technical rehearsals in early December, followed by dress rehearsals on 12 December. Her performance of "Miau miau" at the contest is staged by Mads Enggaard, who has previously worked in analogous positions on various past Eurovision entries for Azerbaijan, Denmark and Greece. She is joined on stage by three dancers from the Nero Dance Center in Baku.

=== Voting ===
The same voting system that was introduced in the 2017 edition will be used, where the results will be determined by 50% online voting and 50% jury voting. Every participating broadcaster assembles a national jury that consists of three music industry professionals and two children aged between 10 and 15 who are citizens of the country they represent. The rankings of those jurors are combined to make an overall top ten.

The online voting consists of two phases. The first phase of the online voting will begin on 12 December 2025 when a recap of all the rehearsal performances is shown on the contest's website Junioreurovision.tv before the viewers can vote. After this, voters will also have the option to watch longer one-minute clips from each participant's rehearsal. This first round of voting will end on 13 December at 16:59 CET. The second phase of the online voting will take place during the live show and begin right after the last performance and will be open for 15 minutes. International viewers will be able to vote for three songs. They will also be able to vote for their own country's song. These votes will then be turned into points which will be determined by the percentage of votes received. For example, if a song receives 10% of the votes, it will receive 10% of the available points.

At the end of the show, Azerbaijan received 12 points from juries and 54 points from online voting, placing 15th.

Points awarded to Azerbaijan
Score	Country
12 points	
10 points	
8 points	
7 points	Malta
6 points	
5 points	
4 points	
3 points	Netherlands
2 points	Albania
1 point	
Azerbaijan received 54 points from the online vote

Points awarded by Azerbaijan
Score	Country
12 points	Italy
10 points	Albania
8 points	Georgia
7 points	San Marino
6 points	Poland
5 points	France
4 points	Spain
3 points	Armenia
2 points	Cyprus
1 point	Malta

==== Detailed voting results ====
The following members comprised the Azerbaijani jury:

- Omar Babir Babirli
- Tofig Natig Hajiyev
- Yashar Hafiz Bakhishov
- Humay Tahir Aslanova
- Narmin Javad Narimanli

Detailed voting results from Azerbaijan
Draw	Country	Juror A	Juror B	Juror C	Juror D	Juror E	Rank	Points
01	Malta	10	14	14	6	5	10	1
02	Azerbaijan							
03	Croatia	13	12	10	8	15	14	
04	San Marino	6	9	7	3	2	4	7
05	Armenia	14	4	4	17	16	8	3
06	Ukraine	9	13	8	15	9	13	
07	Ireland	16	11	16	14	10	16	
08	Netherlands	5	8	17	9	13	12	
09	Poland	12	3	5	4	4	5	6
10	North Macedonia	11	6	11	10	8	11	
11	Montenegro	17	16	12	12	12	17	
12	Italy	1	2	1	7	1	1	12
13	Portugal	8	15	15	11	17	15	
14	Spain	2	10	13	13	11	7	4
15	Georgia	4	1	3	5	7	3	8
16	Cyprus	15	17	9	2	14	9	2
17	France	7	7	6	16	6	6	5
18	Albania	3	5	2	1	3	2	10
