= Ukraine in the Junior Eurovision Song Contest 2025 =

- Junior Eurovision Song Contest 2025
- Participating broadcaster: Public Broadcasting Company of Ukraine (Suspilne)
- Country: Ukraine
- Selection process: Natsvidbir na Dytiache Yevrobachennia – 2025
- Selection date: 12 October 2025

Competing entry
- Song: "Motanka"
- Artist: Sofiia Nersesian
- Songwriters: Svitlana Tarabarova

Placement
- Final result: 2nd, 177 points

Participation chronology

Ukraine was represented at the Junior Eurovision Song Contest 2025 with the song "Motanka", written by Svitlana Tarabarova and performed by Sofiia Nersesian. The Ukrainian participating broadcaster, Suspilne, selected its entry through the national final Natsvidbir na Dytiache Yevrobachennia – 2025.

== Background ==
Prior to the 2025 contest, Ukraine had participated in the contest nineteen times since its first entry in the 2006 contest. Since then, the country has won the contest on one occasion in 2012 with the song "Nebo" performed by Anastasiya Petryk. The nation originally opted not to take part in the contest in 2018 (due to financial and structural difficulties), but would later be added to the list of participating countries. In 2024, Artem Kotenko competed for Ukraine with the song "Hear Me Now", which ended up in third place out of 17 entries with 203 points.

== Before Junior Eurovision ==
=== Natsvidbir na Dytiache Yevrobachennia – 2025 ===
Natsvidbir na Dytiache Yevrobachennia – 2025 was the national final format developed by Suspilne in order to select Ukraine's entry for the Junior Eurovision Song Contest 2025. The competition consisted of a final held on 12 October 2025, hosted by Anna Tulieva, Masha Kondratenko and Timur Miroshnychenko. The show was broadcast on Suspilne Kultura, as well as on Suspilne's online platforms.

The show was watched by 618 thousand viewers in Ukraine for a 2.88% share, marking an increase of 1.77% share compared to the 2024 edition as well as the highest viewership values for a Ukrainian national final since 2014.

==== Format ====
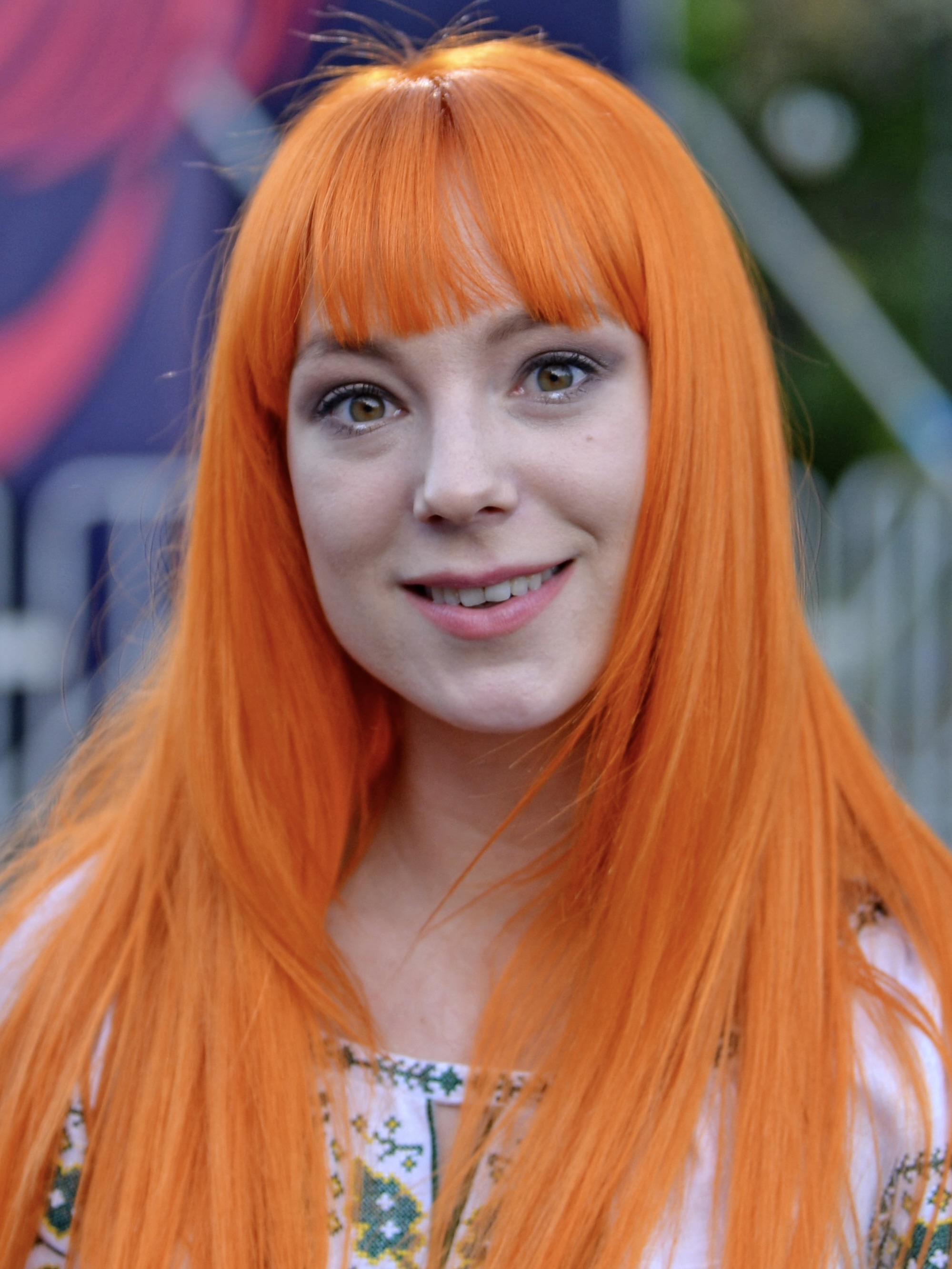
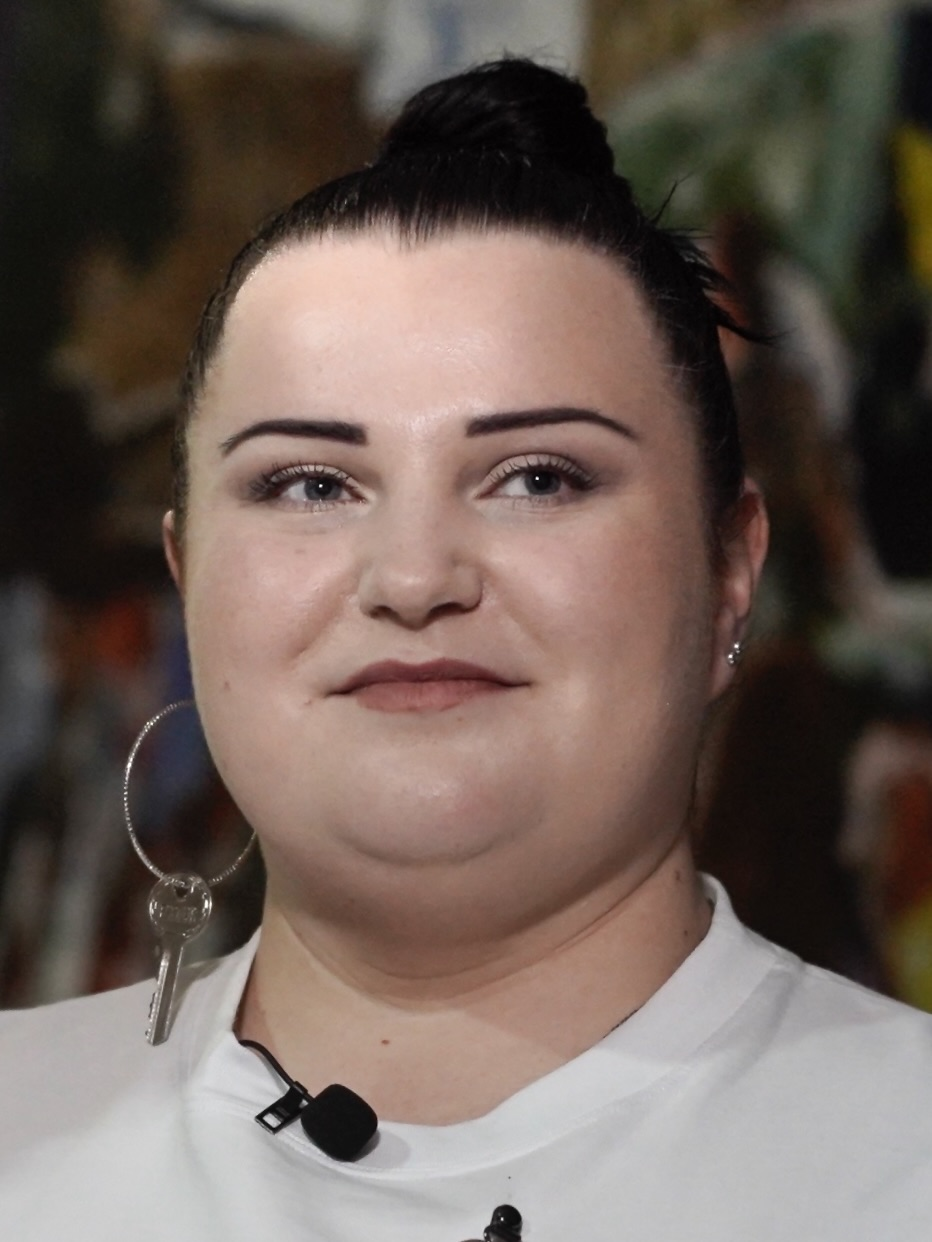
Svitlana Tarabarova and Alyona Alyona, head songwriters of Natsvidbir na Dytiache Yevrobachennia – 2025

The selection of the competing entries for the national final took place over three stages. In the first stage, artists could apply for the competition through an online submission form. For the third year in a row, Svitlana Tarabarova was the music producer of the event, who was in charge of reviewing the received submissions and selecting a longlist of 15 participants, announced on 21 July 2025. In the second stage, the longlisted artists were assessed by competition producers Tarabarova, Anton Pozhydaiev and Danylo Diemiekhin alongside Alyona Alyona (who represented Ukraine in the Eurovision Song Contest 2024 with Jerry Heil) and Timur Miroshnychenko, at an event labeled as the "star school", which took place at the Recording House of Radio Ukraine in Kyiv, where they attended vocal lessons, stage workshops, choreography classes and sessions with psychologists to help them manage performance anxiety, with twelve acts, announced on 8 September, proceeding to the next stage of the competition, then nine acts, announced on 21 September, advancing further, and eventually six acts, announced on 28 September, qualifying for the final. The third stage consisted of Suspline assigning specially-made songs written by Tarabarova and Alyona Alyona – the head songwriters of the competition; no original song submitted by a competing artist made the final.

The "star school" and finalist selection process were documented in the show Shchodennyky Dytiachoho Yevrobachennia ("Junior Eurovision diaries"), consisting of six broadcasts hosted by Miroshnychenko and Tulieva and aired weekly on Suspilne Kultura between 7 September and 5 October 2025. The six selected artists took part in a final on 12 October 2025, where the winner was determined by a 50/50 combination of jury and public votes – the latter being cast through the Diia application over two phases of voting and taking precedence in the event of a tie.

==== Competing entries ====
The submission process for interested artists aged between nine and fourteen was open between 16 June and 10 July 2025. All submissions required participants to enter covers of two songs and a separate introduction video; however, artists were also allowed to submit original songs for consideration. Complete submissions were not given precedence, with Suspilne reserving the right to replace a song submitted by an eventual finalist with a new entry of its choice if such a case was to occur. At the closing of the submission process, 510 applications had been received. The producers also reserved the option to form one act by combining multiple acts that had reached the top nine stage, which was later invoked. (Note: Mariia Sviiazova originally qualified for the final, with Anhelina Hlohus and the duo formed by Zlata Ivaniv and Vladyslav Vasytskyi combined into one act by the producers. However, following Sviiazova's withdrawal due to "family circumstances", the remaining artists advanced to the final as two individual acts.) The songs were released on the official Eurovision Ukraine YouTube channel on 29 September.

Longlisted artists
Artist	Top 12	Top 9	Top 6	Result
Anhelina Hlohus	Yes			Finalist
Artem Manzhura	No	—N/a		Eliminated
Kateryna Vatan	Yes		No	Eliminated
Kyrylo Pariienko	No	—N/a		Eliminated
Likeriia Chyrva	Yes			Finalist
Mariia Sviiazova	Yes			Withdrew
Mriinyky	Yes	No	—N/a	Eliminated
Oleksandr and Davyd Podliashchuk	Yes	No	—N/a	Eliminated
Olha Nesterko	Yes			Finalist
Oliviia Tkachyk	Yes	No	—N/a	Eliminated
Riehina Kulynenko	No	—N/a		Eliminated
Sofiia Nersesian	Yes			Finalist
Vladyslav Danilevskyi	Yes		No	Eliminated
Vsevolod Skryma	Yes			Finalist
Zlata Ivaniv and Vladyslav Vasytskyi	Yes			Finalist

Natsvidbir na Dytiache Yevrobachennia – 2025 participating entries
Artist	Song	Songwriter(s)
Anhelina Hlohus	"Moie sertse" (Моє серце)	Aliona Savranenko
Likeriia Chyrva	"Ne taka yak vsi" (Не така як всі)	Aliona Savranenko
Olha Nesterko	"Zozulia" (Зозуля)	Svitlana Tarabarova
Sofiia Nersesian	"Motanka" (Мотанка)	Svitlana Tarabarova
Vsevolod Skryma	"Young Heart"	Svitlana Tarabarova
Zlata Ivaniv and Vladyslav Vasytskyi	"Zorianyi chas" (Зоряний час)	Aliona Savranenko; Maksym Zabihach; Oles Mykhailovych

==== Final ====
The final took place on 12 October 2025. The members of the jury were: Michelle Andrade (singer and television presenter), Natela Chkhartishvili-Zatsarynna (general producer of M1 and M2) and Vlad Darwin (singer-songwriter). In addition to the competing entries, the guest performers included Artem Kotenko with "Hear Me Now", Tarabarova and Berestovyi with "Spy, kotyku mylyi", Alyona Alyona with "Tato", Ziferblat with "Bird of Pray" and Masha Kondratenko with a medley of her songs, after which the finalists performed a common song titled "Mrii smilyvo" alongside Alyona Alyona and Tarabarova. 190,071 Ukrainians ultimately voted on the Diia app. Ten-year-old Kyiv-born Ukrainian-Armenian singer Sofiia Nersesian was declared the winner with the song "Motanka".

Final – 12 October 2025
R/O	Artist	Song	Jury	Public vote		Total	Place
R/O	Artist	Song	Jury	Votes	Points	Total	Place
1	Likeriia Chyrva	"Ne taka yak vsi"	1	35,622	4	5	5
2	Olha Nesterko	"Zozulia"	2	40,874	5	7	3
3	Sofiia Nersesian	"Motanka"	5	48,074	6	11	1
4	Zlata Ivaniv and Vladyslav Vasytskyi	"Zorianyi chas"	6	22,471	2	8	2
5	Vsevolod Skryma	"Young Heart"	3	18,455	1	4	6
6	Anhelina Hlohus	"Moie sertse"	4	24,575	3	7	4

=== Preparation ===
On 28 November 2025, a revamped version of "Motanka" was released, featuring updated instrumentals and a reworked chorus that placed the English lyrics before the Ukrainian ones, with the latter change added at Sofiia's request.

== At Junior Eurovision ==
The Junior Eurovision Song Contest 2025 took place at the Gymnastic Hall of Olympic City in Tbilisi, Georgia on 13 December 2025. On 4 November 2025, an allocation draw was held to determine the running order of the contest, ahead of which each song was classified into a different category based on its musical style and tempo. Ukraine was drawn to perform in position 6, following the entry from the Armenia and before the entry from Ireland.

In Ukraine, the event was broadcast on Suspilne Kultura with commentary by Timur Miroshnychenko.

=== Voting ===
The same voting system that was introduced in the 2017 edition will be used, where the results will be determined by 50% online voting and 50% jury voting. Every participating broadcaster assembles a national jury that consists of three music industry professionals and two children aged between 10 and 15 who are citizens of the country they represent. The rankings of those jurors are combined to make an overall top ten.

The online voting consists of two phases. The first phase of the online voting will begin on 12 December 2025 when a recap of all the rehearsal performances is shown on the contest's website Junioreurovision.tv before the viewers can vote. After this, voters will also have the option to watch longer one-minute clips from each participant's rehearsal. This first round of voting will end on 13 December at 16:59 CET. The second phase of the online voting will take place during the live show and begin right after the last performance and will be open for 15 minutes. International viewers will be able to vote for three songs. They will also be able to vote for their own country's song. These votes will then be turned into points which will be determined by the percentage of votes received. For example, if a song receives 10% of the votes, it will receive 10% of the available points.

The spokesperson for the Ukrainian jury was Artem Kotenko, who represented Ukraine in the 2024 contest. Ukraine placed second in the final, scoring 177 points; 98 points from the online vote, which it won, and 79 points from the juries. This marked Ukraine's best result in the contest since 2013.

Points awarded to Ukraine
Score	Country
12 points	
10 points	Montenegro; San Marino
8 points	Croatia
7 points	
6 points	Armenia; France; Georgia; Malta
5 points	Albania; Cyprus
4 points	Netherlands; North Macedonia
3 points	Ireland; Portugal
2 points	Spain
1 point	Italy
Ukraine received 98 points from the online vote

Points awarded by Ukraine
Score	Country
12 points	Armenia
10 points	France
8 points	Albania
7 points	Netherlands
6 points	North Macedonia
5 points	Italy
4 points	Poland
3 points	San Marino
2 points	Georgia
1 point	Spain

==== Detailed voting results ====
The following members comprised the Ukrainian jury:

- Anhelina Hlohus – child singer, finalist of Natsvidbir na Dytiache Yevrobachennia in 2024 and 2025
- Ilona Hvozdova – choreographer and dancer
- Masha Kondratenko – singer-songwriter, finalist of Vidbir 2025
- Vsevolod Skryma – child singer, finalist of Natsvidbir na Dytiache Yevrobachennia – 2025
- Yevhen Triplov – singer-songwriter and music producer, head songwriter of Natsvidbir na Dytiache Yevrobachennia – 2024

Detailed voting results from Ukraine
Draw	Country	Juror A	Juror B	Juror C	Juror D	Juror E	Rank	Points
01	Malta	10	9	10	9	9	11	
02	Azerbaijan	13	10	7	12	8	12	
03	Croatia	17	17	14	16	16	16	
04	San Marino	9	8	6	7	7	8	3
05	Armenia	1	2	2	1	1	1	12
06	Ukraine							
07	Ireland	16	16	15	15	14	15	
08	Netherlands	4	3	5	11	3	4	7
09	Poland	7	7	9	3	11	7	4
10	North Macedonia	6	6	8	6	4	5	6
11	Montenegro	14	14	16	10	10	13	
12	Italy	11	5	4	13	5	6	5
13	Portugal	12	12	13	14	15	14	
14	Spain	8	11	11	4	13	10	1
15	Georgia	5	13	12	5	12	9	2
16	Cyprus	15	15	17	17	17	17	
17	France	2	1	1	2	2	2	10
18	Albania	3	4	3	8	6	3	8
