= Albert Armenakyan =

Armenian child singer (born 2013)

- Born: 17 September 2013 (age 13); Yerevan, Armenia
- Occupation: Singer
- Years active: 2025–present

Albert Armenakyan (Armenian: Ալբերտ Արմենակյանը; born 17 September 2013), also known by the mononym Albert (Armenian: Ալբերտ), is an Armenian child singer. He began his career by participating in the Voice Kids France. He represented Armenia in the Junior Eurovision Song Contest 2025 with the song “Brave Heart”.

== Biography ==
=== Early and personal life ===
Armenakyan was born in Yerevan, Armenia on 17 September 2013. He currently studies at Yerevan's Hayrapet Hayrapetyan Basic School No. 78, attends the piano department of A. Spendiaryan Specialised Music School and also the vocal department of Zaruhi Babayan's singing studio.

=== 2025: The Voice Kids France and the Junior Eurovision Song Contest 2025 ===
On the Voice Kids France he first performed the song “Dle Yaman” and joined Patrick Flori's team. He then performed Help! by The Beatles and advanced. He then performed the song “My Heart Will Go On” by Celine Dion in the final, however he was eliminated.

The Voice Kids France (2025)
Stage	Song	Result	Ref.
Blind Auditions	“Dle Yaman”	Advanced	
Group Results	“Help!” (by the Beatles)	Advanced	
Final	"My Heart Will Go On" (by Celine Dion)	Eliminated	

On 22 October it was announced that Armenakyan would be the Armenian representative for the Junior Eurovision Song Contest 2025. His song “Brave Heart” was released on 7th November 2025.

The Armenian Broadcaster released "Junior Eurovision Diaries" which follows Albert during his preparation for the contest.

Armenia placed fourth in the final, scoring 175 points; 58 points from the online vote and 117 points from the juries.

== Discography ==
=== Singles ===
Year	Title	Album or EP	Ref.
2025	"Brave Heart"	Junior Eurovision Song Contest 2025	

== Videography ==
=== Music videos ===
==== As Lead artist ====
Year	Title	Producer	Director	Ref.
2025	"Brave Heart"	David Tserunyan	—N/a (Note: None mentioned)	

== Notes and references ==
=== References ===
Awards and achievements
Preceded by Leo with "Cosmic Friend"	Armenia in the Junior Eurovision Song Contest; 2025	Succeeded by Naré with "Boo!"
