= Junior Eurovision Song Contest 2025 =

23rd edition of international song competition

- United by Music

Date and venue
- Final: 13 December 2025
- Venue: Gymnastic Hall of Olympic City; Tbilisi, Georgia

Organisation
- Organiser: European Broadcasting Union (EBU)
- ESC director: Martin Green
- ESC executive producer: Gert Kark

Production
- Host broadcaster: Georgian Public Broadcaster (GPB)
- Director: Basa Potskhishvili
- Executive producer: Natia Mshvenieradze
- Artistic director: Marvin Dietmann
- Presenters: Davit Aladashvili; Liza Tsiklauri

Participants
- Number of entries: 18
- Returning countries: Azerbaijan; Croatia; Montenegro
- Non-returning countries: Estonia; Germany
- Participation map: Competing countries Countries that participated in the past but not in 2025

Vote
- Voting system: The professional jury of each country awards a set of 12, 10, 8–1 points to 10 songs. Viewers around the world vote for 3 songs, and their votes are distributed proportionally. The votes of the jury and the audience make up 50% of all votes.
- Winning song: France "Ce monde"

The Junior Eurovision Song Contest 2025 was the 23rd edition of the Junior Eurovision Song Contest, held on 13 December 2025 at the Gymnastic Hall of Olympic City in Tbilisi, Georgia, and presented by Davit Aladashvili and Liza Tsiklauri. It was organised by the European Broadcasting Union (EBU) and host broadcaster Georgian Public Broadcaster (GPB), which staged the event after winning the 2024 contest for Georgia with the song "To My Mom" by Andria Putkaradze. It was the second time that Georgia hosted the contest, having previously done so in 2017.

Broadcasters from eighteen countries participated in the contest, the largest number of participants since 2021. Azerbaijan, Croatia, and Montenegro returned after absences from recent contests, while Estonia and Germany opted not to participate after doing so the previous year.

The winner was France with the song "Ce monde" by Lou Deleuze, its fourth win in six years. Ukraine won the public vote and finished in second place, its best placing since 2013, with Georgia, Armenia, and Spain completing the top five. San Marino received its best result in any Eurovision event to date, and, for the fourth year in a row, Albania received its second-best result to date. Ireland finished last for the second time in three years.

== Location ==
Location of the selected host city (in blue)

Unlike the Eurovision Song Contest, the winning broadcaster of the previous year's Junior Eurovision Song Contest does not automatically receive the right to host the next edition. However, since 2011 (with the exceptions of 2012, 2015, 2018, and 2024) it has become customary for winners to take on hosting duties, and since 2019, the winning broadcaster has had the right of first refusal on hosting the following competition. In 2024, French broadcaster France Télévisions was given this right but ultimately opted out of it.

On 16 November 2024, upon her country's victory in the 2024 contest, Tinatin Berdzenishvili, the director of the Georgian Public Broadcaster (GPB), stated that the broadcaster would hold discussions with the EBU regarding hosting the 2025 contest. GPB's First Channel stated the same day on its Facebook page that the contest would be held in Georgia. Dutch broadcaster AVROTROS repeated the claim in April 2025, but later retracted it. On 9 April, the Georgian State Procurement Agency revealed that the contest would be hosted in Tbilisi on 13 December, which was confirmed by the EBU on 13 May; it was the second time that Georgia hosted the contest, having previously done so in 2017.

The Olympic Palace, the venue of the 2017 contest, was initially selected as the location. This was first reported in May following comments by Levan Zhorzholiani, the Georgian Government's Head of Administration, before being subsequently repeated by several participating broadcasters between June and September and officially confirmed by the EBU on 1 October. However, on 24 November, it was reported that the contest had relocated to the Gymnastic Hall of Olympic City, citing the unavailability of the Olympic Palace for an assessment visit required by the EBU; the change was confirmed through the contest's official website.

== Participants ==
Eligibility for participation in the Junior Eurovision Song Contest requires a national broadcaster with active EBU membership capable of receiving the contest via the Eurovision network and broadcasting it live nationwide. The EBU issues invitations to participate in the contest to all active members.

On 1 October 2025, the EBU announced that broadcasters from 18 countries would participate in the 2025 contest. Azerbaijan, Croatia, and Montenegro returned after three, ten and nine-year absences respectively. Meanwhile, Estonia and Germany opted not to participate after doing so the previous year.

Prior to the contest, a digital compilation album featuring all the songs from the 2025 contest was put together by the EBU and released by Universal Music on 29 November 2025.

Participants of the Junior Eurovision Song Contest 2025
Country	Broadcaster	Artist	Song	Language	Songwriter(s)	Ref.
Albania	RTSH	Kroni Pula	"Fruta perime"	Albanian	Adrian Hila	
Armenia	AMPTV	Albert	"Brave Heart"	Armenian	Anita Hakhverdyan; Lilit Navasardyan	
Azerbaijan	İTV	Yağmur	"Miau miau"	Azerbaijani, English	Diana Hajiyeva; Hafiz Bakhish; Mila Miles; Rustam Rzayev	
Croatia	HRT	Marino Vrgoč	"Snovi"	Croatian	Arjana Kunštek; Ines Prajo; Marino Vrgoč	
Cyprus	CyBC	Rafaella and Christos	"Away"	Greek, English	Andy Lys; Christopher Wortley; Greig Watts; Hannah Brine; Paul Drew; Peter Barringer	
France	France Télévisions	Lou Deleuze	"Ce monde"	French	John Claes; Jonathan Thyssens; Pauline Thisse	
Georgia	GPB	Anita Abgariani	"Shine Like a Star"	Georgian, English	Giorgi Kukhianidze; Mariam Ghvaladze	
Ireland	TG4	Lottie O'Driscoll Murray	"Rúin"	Irish	Ian James White; Jenny Ní Ruiséil; Nicky Brennan; Rob O'Connor	
Italy	RAI	Leonardo Giovannangeli	"Rockstar"	Italian, English	Claudia Zanecchia; Giancarlo Prandelli	
Malta	PBS	Eliza Borg	"I Believe"	English	Destiny Chukunyere; Elton Zarb; Matthew Mercieca	
Montenegro	RTCG	Asja Džogović	"I tužna i srećna priča" (И тужна и срећна прича)	Montenegrin	Danijel Alibabić; Natalija Pavićević	
Netherlands	AVROTROS	Meadow	"Freeze"	Dutch, English	Daniel van der Molen; Elke Tiel; Stas Swaczyna	
North Macedonia	MRT	Nela Mančeska	"Miracle"	Macedonian, English	Lazar Cvetkoski; Magdalena Cvetkovska	
Poland	TVP	Marianna Kłos	"Brightest Light"	Polish, English	Brajan Litkowiec; Jacek Mrówczyński; Jakub Laszuk; Jeremi Siejka; Krzysztof Junak; Paulina Elżbieta Romaniuk-Jasińska	
Portugal	RTP	Inês Gonçalves	"Para onde vai o amor?"	Portuguese	Aurora Pinto; Bernardo Espinho; João Direitinho; Miguel Cristovinho	
San Marino	SMRTV	Martina Crv	"Beyond the Stars"	Italian, English	Elisa Gaiotto; Karin Amadori; Nicola Marotta; Valerio Carboni	
Spain	RTVE	Gonzalo Pinillos	"Érase una vez (Once Upon a Time)"	Spanish, English	Alejandro Martínez; David Parejo; Gonzalo Pinillos; Luis Ramiro	
Ukraine	Suspilne	Sofiia Nersesian	"Motanka" (Мотанка)	Ukrainian, English	Svitlana Tarabarova	

== Production ==
In June 2025, the EBU announced that Martin Österdahl would step down from his role as executive supervisor of the contest, with ESC director Martin Green temporarily assuming Österdahl's duties. On 1 October, Gert Kark was appointed to the contest's reference group, taking Österdahl's vacated spot. A few days later, it was revealed that he would serve in the newly created position of ESC executive producer. Kark had previously worked as project manager for the contest since 2016.

In July 2025, the Government of Georgia allocated ₾8.1 million (€2.6 million) to hosting the contest from its reserve fund; this figure had been raised to ₾9 million (€2.9 million) by November 2025. The creation of the background music as well as the opening and interval acts was overseen by music producer Giga Kukhianidze. Repeating his function from the previous edition was Marvin Dietmann as artistic director.

=== Slogan, visual and stage design ===
In August 2025, ESC director Martin Green revealed that "United by Music", the permanent slogan of the Eurovision Song Contest since November 2023, would also be adopted by the Junior Eurovision Song Contest in order to make the two events "come within the same brand family".

On 9 September 2025, the EBU released a revamped version of the generic logo, which is modeled after the revamped logo of the adult contest that is set to be introduced in its 2026 edition, designed by the Sheffield-based branding studio Pals. On 1 October 2025, GPB unveiled the theme art and stage design for the 2025 contest. The visual identity features a custom wordmark of the slogan, combining plain uppercase lettering with handwritten characters that "echo the playful creativity of the young artists representing their countries", with threads of vibrant colours in the background. The stage was inspired by the mountains, castles, fortified villages and towers of Georgia's landscape, with its central element being a depiction of the doli.

=== Presenters ===
Davit Aladashvili and Liza Tsiklauri were announced as the presenters of the show on 7 November 2025.

=== Postcards ===
The "postcards" are short video introductions shown on television while the stage is being prepared for the next entry. Filmed between October and December 2025, they all consisted of the upcoming participant putting on a virtual reality headset and, through it, experiencing a location in Tbilisi while doing various activities. At the conclusion of the postcard, the upcoming participant would take their headset off, and the performance would commence. The locations included Gudiashvili Square, the National Youth and Children's Palace and the Georgian National Opera Theater.

== Contest overview ==
The event took place on 13 December 2025 at 20:00 GET (17:00 CET). Eighteen countries participated, with the running order published on 4 November 2025. All the countries competing were eligible to vote with the jury vote, as well as participating and non-participating countries under an aggregated international online vote. France won with 248 points, winning the jury vote. Ukraine, who won the online vote, came second with 177 points, with Georgia, Armenia, and Spain completing the top five. Croatia, Azerbaijan, Cyprus, Montenegro, and Ireland occupied the bottom five positions.

The opening of the show featured the traditional flag parade accompanied by Andria Putkaradze performing his winning song in 2024, "To My Mom". The interval acts included 2008 winners Bzikebi performing "We Don't Sleep", 2011 winners Candy performing "Code", and all participants along with Putkaradze performing the common song "We're Rising High". All were written by Giorgi Kukhianidze, who previously composed a majority of Georgia's Junior Eurovision entries, including each of its winning songs.

R/O	Country	Artist	Song	Points	Place
1	Malta	Eliza Borg	"I Believe"	92	11
2	Azerbaijan	Yağmur	"Miau miau"	66	15
3	Croatia	Marino Vrgoč	"Snovi"	70	14
4	San Marino	Martina Crv	"Beyond the Stars"	125	9
5	Armenia	Albert	"Brave Heart"	175	4
6	Ukraine	Sofiia Nersesian	"Motanka"	177	2
7	Ireland	Lottie O'Driscoll Murray	"Rúin"	44	18
8	Netherlands	Meadow	"Freeze"	93	10
9	Poland	Marianna Kłos	"Brightest Light"	139	8
10	North Macedonia	Nela Mančeska	"Miracle"	141	7
11	Montenegro	Asja Džogović	"I tužna i srećna priča"	49	17
12	Italy	Leonardo Giovannangeli	"Rockstar"	73	12
13	Portugal	Inês Gonçalves	"Para onde vai o amor?"	73	13
14	Spain	Gonzalo Pinillos	"Érase una vez (Once Upon a Time)"	152	5
15	Georgia	Anita Abgariani	"Shine Like a Star"	176	3
16	Cyprus	Rafaella and Christos	"Away"	50	16
17	France	Lou Deleuze	"Ce monde"	248	1
18	Albania	Kroni Pula	"Fruta perime"	145	6

=== Spokespersons ===
The 12-point score from each country's national jury was revealed by the spokespersons in the following order:

1. Malta – Ramires Sciberras
2. Azerbaijan – Leyla Adigozelzadeh
3. Croatia – Sara Zeba
4. San Marino – Asia Ceccoli
5. Armenia – Nare
6. Ukraine – Artem Kotenko
7. Ireland – Aodán Murphy
8. Netherlands – Luna
9. Poland – Zosia Wójcik
10. North Macedonia – Darija Maksimova
11. Montenegro – Sofija
12. Italy – Nia
13. Portugal – Victoria Nicole
14. Spain – Chloe DelaRosa
15. Georgia – Vache Ghviniashvili
16. Cyprus – Stephani Constantinou
17. France – Titouan
18. Albania – Nikol Çabeli

== Detailed voting results ==
Split results
Place	Combined		Jury		Online vote	
Place	Country	Points	Country	Points	Country	Points
1	France	248	France	152	Ukraine	98
2	Ukraine	177	Georgia	121	France	96
3	Georgia	176	Armenia	117	San Marino	87
4	Armenia	175	Spain	98	Albania	85
5	Spain	152	North Macedonia	92	Poland	67
6	Albania	145	Ukraine	79	Armenia	58
7	North Macedonia	141	Poland	72	Georgia	55
8	Poland	139	Albania	60	Azerbaijan; Spain	54
9	San Marino	125	Malta	54	Azerbaijan; Spain	54
10	Netherlands	93	Netherlands	47	North Macedonia	49
11	Malta	92	San Marino	38	Cyprus; Italy	47
12	Italy	73 (Note: Despite receiving the same number of overall points, Italy was determined to finish ahead of Portugal because it received more points from the online vote.)	Portugal	32	Cyprus; Italy	47
13	Portugal	73	Croatia	28	Netherlands	46
14	Croatia	70	Italy	26	Croatia	42
15	Azerbaijan	66	Azerbaijan	12	Ireland; Portugal	41
16	Cyprus	50	Montenegro	10	Ireland; Portugal	41
17	Montenegro	49	Ireland	3 (Note: Despite receiving the same number of jury points, Ireland was determined to finish ahead of Cyprus because it performed earlier in the show.)	Montenegro	39
18	Ireland	44	Cyprus	3	Malta	38

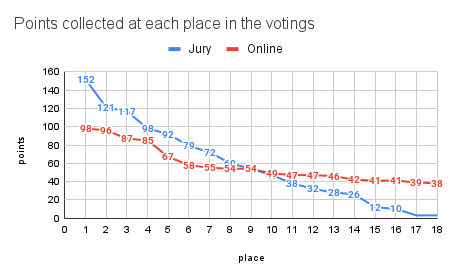
Chart of points collected at each place in the votings

Detailed voting results of the final
Voting procedure used: 100% Online vote 100% Jury vote		Total score	Online vote score	Jury vote score	Jury vote																	
Voting procedure used: 100% Online vote 100% Jury vote		Total score	Online vote score	Jury vote score	Malta	Azerbaijan	Croatia	San Marino	Armenia	Ukraine	Ireland	Netherlands	Poland	North Macedonia	Montenegro	Italy	Portugal	Spain	Georgia	Cyprus	France	Albania
Competing countries	Malta	92	38	54		1	2	5	12		1		6	8		10	1	3		2		3
Competing countries	Azerbaijan	66	54	12	7							3										2
Competing countries	Croatia	70	42	28	5				1					10	7				1	4		
Competing countries	San Marino	125	87	38		7				3	2		5	3	5	3	4		2		4	
Competing countries	Armenia	175	58	117	12	3	7	4		12	8	6	8	1	6		6	4	12	10	10	8
Competing countries	Ukraine	177	98	79	6		8	10	6		3	4		4	10	1	3	2	6	5	6	5
Competing countries	Ireland	44	41	3										2				1				
Competing countries	Netherlands	93	46	47	4			6	7	7			4			5		7		1	5	1
Competing countries	Poland	139	67	72	3	6		3	3	4		1		5	1	6	7	8	8	8	3	6
Competing countries	North Macedonia	141	49	92	2		6	7	10	6	5		7		12	12	2	5	4	3	7	4
Competing countries	Montenegro	49	39	10							4			6								
Competing countries	Italy	73	47	26		12	1			5		7									1	
Competing countries	Portugal	73	41	32			4		2		6	2	3		3	2			3			7
Competing countries	Spain	152	54	98	10	4	10	8	5	1	7	10	1			8	12		7	7	8	
Competing countries	Georgia	176	55	121	8	8	5	2	8	2	12	8	12	7	2	7	10	12		6	2	10
Competing countries	Cyprus	50	47	3		2		1														
Competing countries	France	248	96	152	1	5	12	12	4	10	10	12	10	12	8	4	8	10	10	12		12
Competing countries	Albania	145	85	60		10	3			8		5	2		4		5	6	5		12	

=== 12 points ===
Below is a summary of all 12 points received from each country's professional juries.

12 points awarded by juries
#	Recipient	Countries giving 12 points
6	France	Albania, Croatia, Cyprus, Netherlands, North Macedonia, San Marino
3	Armenia	Georgia, Malta, Ukraine
3	Georgia	Ireland, Poland, Spain
2	North Macedonia	Italy, Montenegro
1	Albania	France
1	Italy	Azerbaijan
1	Malta	Armenia
1	Spain	Portugal

=== Online voting ===
According to the EBU 2.5 million votes were cast.

== Broadcasts ==
All participating broadcasters may choose to have on-site or remote commentators providing insight and voting information to their local audience. The European Broadcasting Union provided an international live stream of the contest through its official YouTube channel with no commentary.

Confirmed broadcasters and commentators
Country	Broadcaster	Channel(s)	Commentator(s)	Ref.
Albania	RTSH	RTSH 1, RTSH Muzikë, Radio Tirana 1	Andri Xhahu	
Armenia	AMPTV	First Channel	Hamlet Arakelyan and Hrachuhi Utmazyan	
Azerbaijan	İTV		Azer Suleymanli and Aysel Zahidgizi	
Croatia	HRT	HRT 2	Duško Ćurlić and Mia Dimšić	
Cyprus	CyBC	RIK 2, RIK HD, RIK Sat	Kyriakos Pastides	
France	France Télévisions	France 4	Stéphane Bern and Zoé Clauzure	
Georgia	GPB	First Channel	Nika Lobiladze	
Ireland	TG4		Louise Cantillon	
Italy	RAI	Rai 2, Rai Gulp (Note: The broadcast of the programme on Rai Gulp was delayed to 20:00 (CET))	Mario Acampa, Luca Tommassini and Iris Di Domenico	
Malta	PBS	TVM	No commentator	
Montenegro	RTCG	TVCG 2	Dražen Baukovič	
Netherlands	AVROTROS	NPO 3	Bart Arens and Matheu Hinzen	
North Macedonia	MRT	MRT 1, MRT 5	Jana Burčeska	
Poland	TVP	TVP2, TVP Polonia, TVP VOD	Artur Orzech	
Portugal	RTP	RTP1, RTP África, RTP Internacional	Carina Jorge and Nuno Galopim	
San Marino	SMRTV	San Marino RTV	Anna Gaspari and Mirco Zani	
Spain	RTVE	La 1, TVE Internacional, Clan	Julia Varela and Tony Aguilar	
Ukraine	Suspilne	Suspilne Kultura	Timur Miroshnychenko	

Confirmed broadcasters and commentators in non-participating countries
Country	Broadcaster	Channel(s)	Commentator(s)	Ref.
Germany	ARD/ZDF	Kika	Felix Schmutzler	
Luxembourg	RTL	RTL Zwee	Laura Thorn and Raoul Roos	

== Reception ==
The EBU has reported that a total of 16 million viewers watched the contest live. The contest was streamed on Twitch for the first time, where it reached 333,270 unique viewers. The overall viewing figures on YouTube Kids increased by 19.2%, while the contest's TikTok profile received 101.2 million views in the time period surrounding the contest, an increase of 46 million compared to the 2024 contest. 7.8 million accounts were reached by official content on Instagram, a new record and up 37% year on year, while 7.9 million users were reached on Facebook, an increase of 1.6 million on 2024.

== See also ==
- Eurovision Song Contest 2025
