= Italy in the Junior Eurovision Song Contest =

- Junior Eurovision Song Contest
- Participating broadcaster: Radiotelevisione italiana (RAI)

Participation summary
- Appearances: 12
- First appearance: 2014
- Highest placement: 1st: 2014
- Participation history: 2014; 2015; 2016; 2017; 2018; 2019; 2020; 2021; 2022; 2023; 2024; 2025; 2026
- For the most recent participation see Italy in the Junior Eurovision Song Contest 2026

Italy has been represented at the Junior Eurovision Song Contest since the twelfth edition in 2014. The Italian participating broadcaster in the contest is Radiotelevisione italiana (RAI).

== History ==
RAI selected its debut entry via an internal selection as "Tu primo grande amore" by Vincenzo Cantiello, which went on to win with a total of 159 points. This made Italy the second country to win with the debut entry after Croatia's victory in the first edition. Before Italy debuted, there were two entries sung in Italian: "Birichino", which represented Switzerland in 2004 and "O-o-o Sole intorno a me" which represented San Marino in 2013.

In 2015, the Italian broadcaster decided to participate again, this time sending the twins Chiara and Martina Scarpari to the contest. However, Italy only finished 16th in the contest, collecting 34 points. The next year, Italy achieved its second podium finishing third.

Italy withdrew from the 2020 contest because of the COVID-19 pandemic, and despite initially announcing that they would not return to the 2021 contest, they ultimately announced that they would return to the 2021 contest in France, where their entrant Elisabetta Lizza placed 10th with 107 points.

Since 2023, Italy has selected its representatives for the competition through the Italian version of "The Voice Kids."

On 2 June 2026, RAI officially confirmed its intention to participate in 2026. On 16 September, RAI announced Matteo Trullu, the winner of the fourth season of The Voice Kids, as the Italian entrant with the song "Che cos’è l’amore?", which was written by Gregorio Castellani, Fabio Zanolini and Luca Faccini, and released on 25 September alongside an accompanying music video. The Junior Eurovision Song Contest 2026 took place at the Malta Fairs & Conventions Centre in Ta' Qali, Malta on 24 October 2026. Italy performed in position 10, following the entry from Malta and before the entry from Ukraine. The nation placed 11th with 87 points. In Italy, the event was broadcast on Rai Gulp and RaiPlay.

== Participation overview ==
Table key
1	First place
3	Third place

Year	Artist	Song	Language	Place	Points
2014	Vincenzo Cantiello	"Tu primo grande amore"	Italian, English	1	159
2015	Chiara and Martina	"Viva"	Italian	16	34
2016	Fiamma Boccia	"Cara mamma (Dear Mom)"	Italian, English	3	209
2017	Maria Iside Fiore	"Scelgo (My Choice)"	Italian, English	11	86
2018	Melissa and Marco	"What Is Love"	Italian, English	7	151
2019	Marta Viola	"La voce della terra"	Italian, English	7	129
2021	Elisabetta Lizza	"Specchio (Mirror on the Wall)"	Italian, English	10	107
2022	Chanel Dilecta	"Bla Bla Bla"	Italian, English	11	95
2023	Melissa and Ranya	"Un mondo giusto"	Italian, English	11	81
2024	Simone Grande	"Pigiama party"	Italian, English	9	98
2025	Leonardo Giovannangeli	"Rockstar"	Italian, English	12	73
2026	Matteo Trullu	"Che cos'è l'amore?"	Italian	11	87

== Commentators and spokespersons ==
The contests are broadcast online worldwide through the official Junior Eurovision Song Contest website junioreurovision.tv and YouTube. In 2015, the online broadcasts featured commentary in English by junioreurovision.tv editor Luke Fisher and 2011 Bulgarian Junior Eurovision Song Contest entrant Ivan Ivanov. The Italian broadcaster, RAI, sent their own commentators to each contest in order to provide commentary in the Italian language. Spokespersons were also chosen by the national broadcaster in order to announce the awarding points from Italy. The table below list the details of each commentator and spokesperson since 2014.

Year(s)	Channel	Commentator	Spokesperson	Ref.
2014	Rai Gulp	Antonella Clerici and Simone Lijoi	Geordie	
2015	Rai Gulp	Simone Lijoi	Vincenzo Cantiello	
2016	Rai Gulp	Simone Lijoi and Laura Carusino Vignera	Jade Scicluna	
2017	Rai Gulp	Laura Carusino and Mario Acampa	Sofia Bartoli	
2018	Rai Gulp	Federica Carta and Mario Acampa	Yan Musvidas	
2019	Rai Gulp	Mario Acampa and Alexia Rizzardi	Maria Iside Fiore	
2020	No broadcast		Did not participate	N/A
2021	Rai Gulp	Mario Acampa, Marta Viola and Giorgia Boni	Céleste	
2022	Rai 1	Mario Acampa, Francesca Fialdini, Rosanna Vaudetti and Gigliola Cinquetti	Vincenzo Cantiello	
2023	Rai 1	Mario Acampa	Julia Wazne	
2024	Rai 2	Mario Acampa, Simone Barlaam and Kaze	Unknown	
2025	Rai 2, Rai Gulp (Note: The broadcast of the programme on Rai Gulp was delayed to 20:00 (CET))	Mario Acampa, Luca Tommassini and Iris Di Domenico	Nia	
2025	Rai Gulp	Mario Acampa	Michael	

== Photo gallery ==
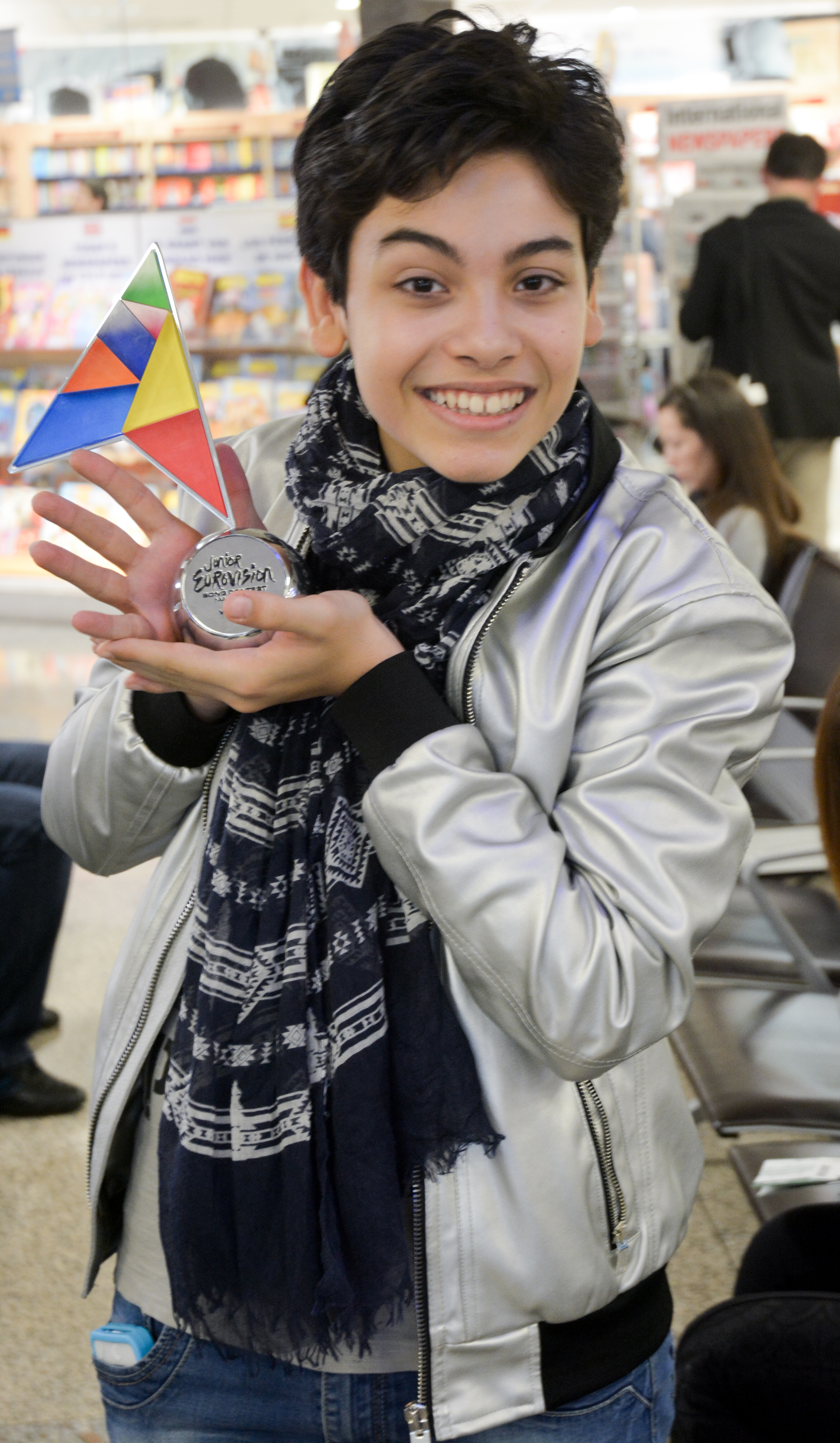
Vincenzo Cantiello in Malta International Airport with the winner's prize, after his victory (2014)

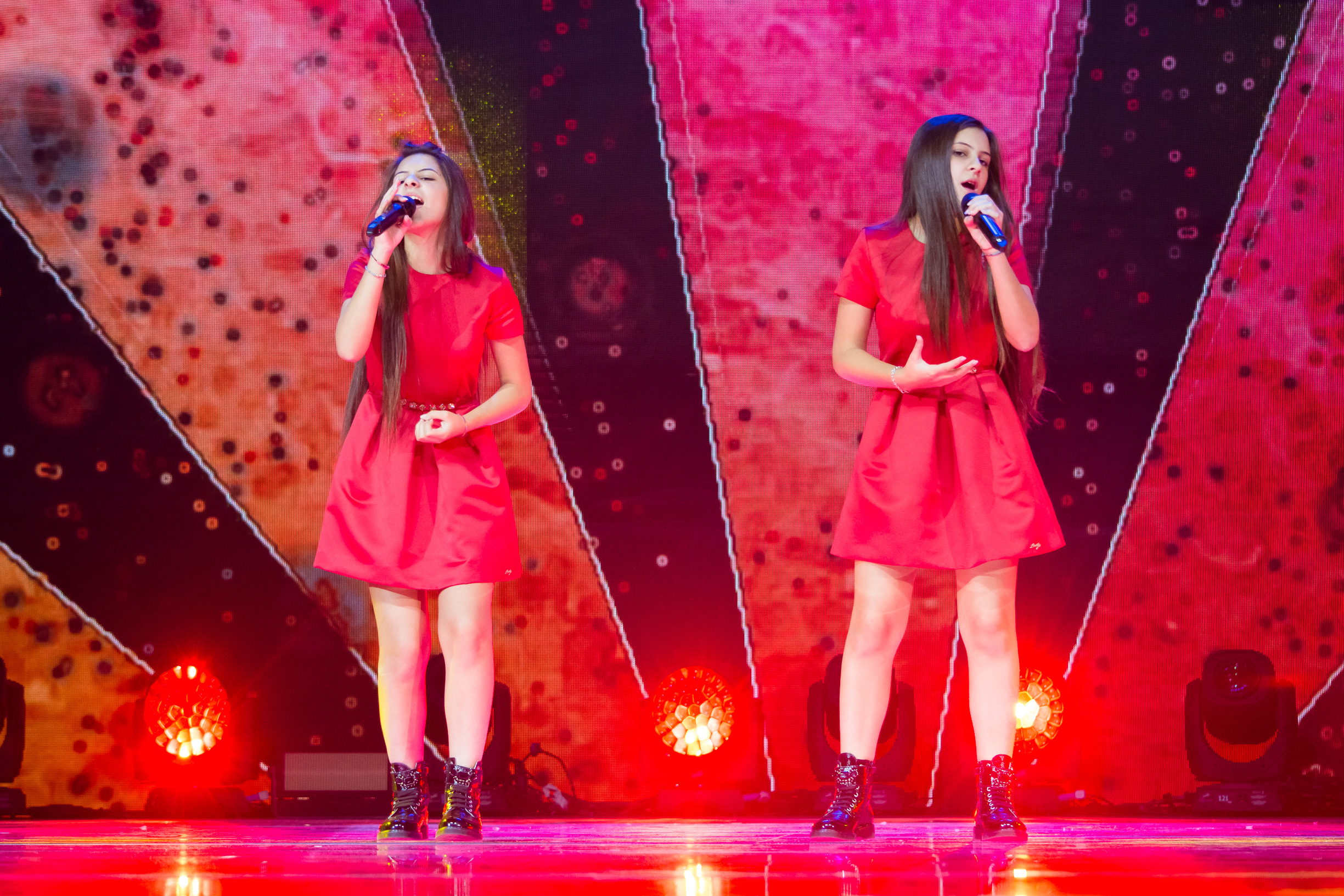
Chiara & Martina performing "Viva" in Sofia (2015)

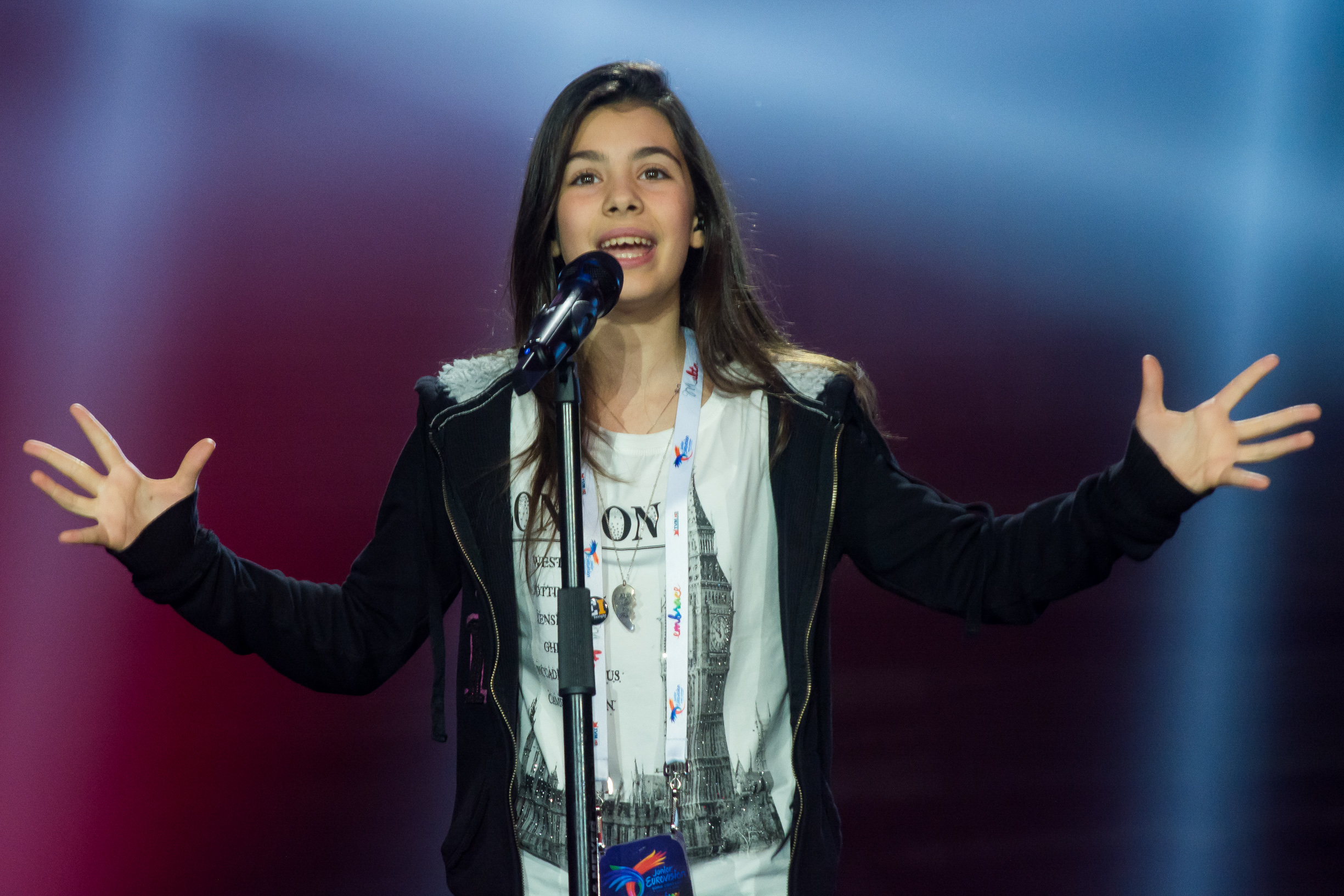
Fiamma Boccia performing "Cara Mamma (Dear Mom)" in Valletta (2016)

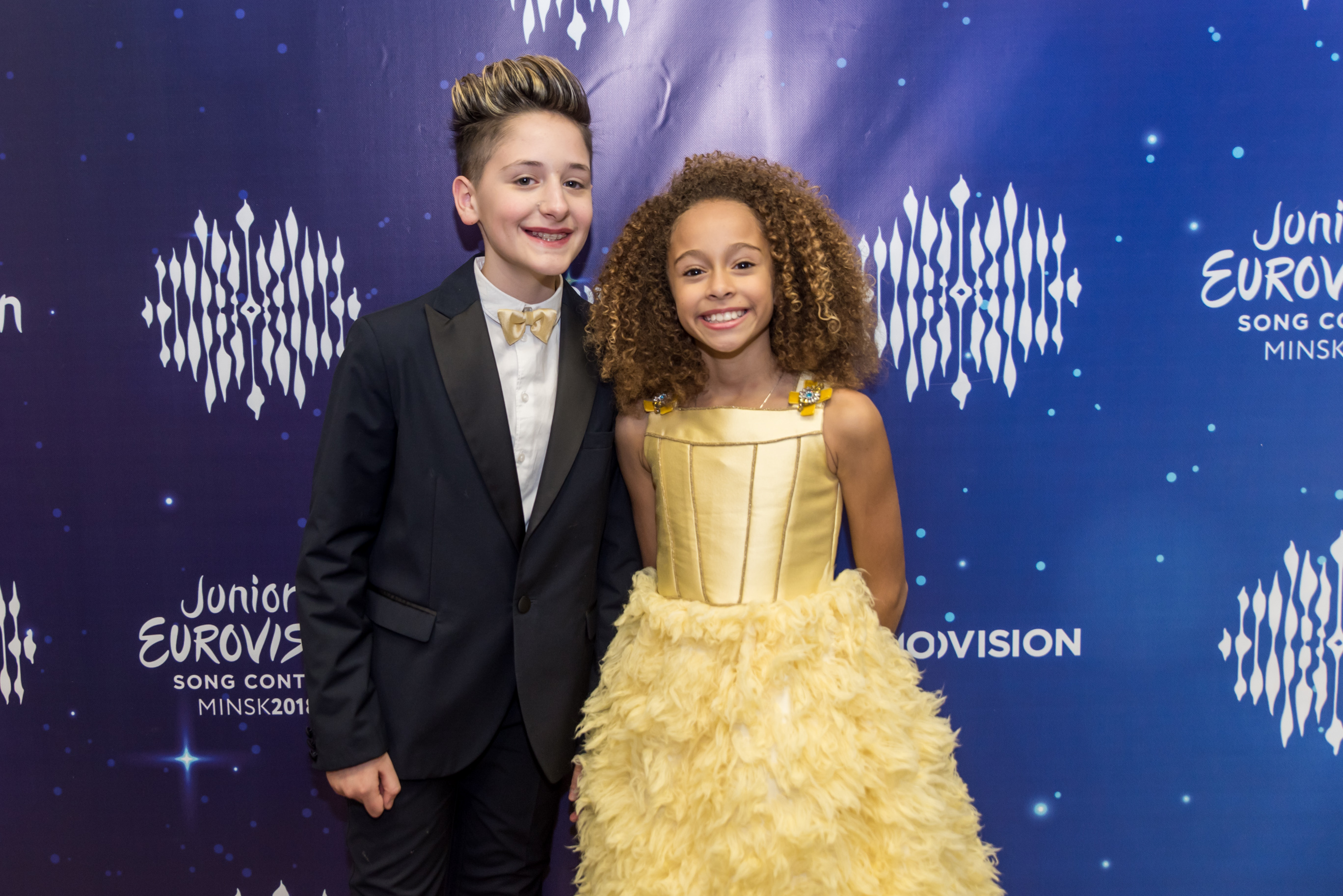
Melissa and Marco in Minsk (2018)

== See also ==
- Italy in the Eurovision Song Contest – Senior version of the Junior Eurovision Song Contest.
