= Croatia in the Junior Eurovision Song Contest =

- Junior Eurovision Song Contest
- Participating broadcaster: Hrvatska radiotelevizija (HRT)

Participation summary
- Appearances: 6
- First appearance: 2003
- Last appearance: 2025
- Highest placement: 1st: 2003
- Participation history: 2003; 2004; 2005; 2006; 2007 – 2013; 2014; 2015 – 2024; 2025
- For the most recent participation see Croatia in the Junior Eurovision Song Contest 2025

Croatia has been represented at the Junior Eurovision Song Contest six times, winning the inaugural edition in 2003. The Croatian participating broadcaster in the contest is Hrvatska radiotelevizija (HRT). It participated in the first four editions, from 2003 to 2006, organising a national final to select its entrant. The first Croatian entry was "Ti si moja prva ljubav" by Dino Jelusić, which finished in first place out of sixteen participants, with a score of 134 points.

HRT was absent from the contest between 2007 and 2013, but it decided to return to the contest in 2014 and selected its entry internally. In 2014, "Game Over" by Josie finished in last place, after which HRT again withdrew from competing the following year.

HRT returned in 2025, with The Voice Kids Hrvatska winner Marino Vrgoč to represent the country. Following a fourteenth place finish, HRT opted against participating in 2026.

== History ==
Croatia are one of the sixteen countries to have made their debut at the inaugural Junior Eurovision Song Contest 2003, which took place on 15 November 2003 at the Forum in Copenhagen, Denmark. After problems occurred with the prospective host for the 2004 contest, Croatian broadcaster Hrvatska radiotelevizija (HRT) stepped in to host the contest. However, this was later abandoned after it was revealed the venue HRT had planned on using for the contest was to be in use during the period of the contest. HRT was one of six other broadcasters to enter a bid to host the 2005 contest, however this was unsuccessful. Croatia also expressed an interest in hosting the 2006 contest and made another unsuccessful bid to host the 2007 contest.

HRT withdrew from the 2007 contest, due to expense and difficulties in broadcasting the contest live. In October 2007, the broadcaster was fined 10,000 Swiss francs for breaching the rules of the 2006 contest by not broadcasting the show live on one of their main terrestrial channels despite initially declaring it would do so, and instead decided at the last minute to broadcast it only on satellite channel HRT Plus which was not widely available in the country; consequently a reserve jury had to take the place of the televoting. A recording of the contest was later aired, in a late evening slot, on a main channel. The broadcaster had sent several requests to the EBU to move the show to an earlier time slot, using 17:00 as an example and also asked for permission to broadcast the contest in a delayed time slot more convenient for its programming schedule but these requests were declined. The EBU would later relax the rule ahead of the 2007 contest.

On 23 September 2014, it was announced that Croatia could possibly return to the 2014 contest in Marsa, Malta due to a tweet composed by the Executive Supervisor of the Junior Eurovision Song Contest, Vladislav Yakovlev. Their return was officially confirmed by the EBU on 26 September 2014, with the 2014 contest being scheduled to be broadcast on HRT 2. On 23 June 2015, it was announced that HRT would withdraw from the 2015 contest, leaving Croatia out of the edition which took place in Bulgaria. On 17 August 2016, HRT ruled out a return to the 2016 contest. On 20 May 2017, the Croatian broadcaster announced their ambitions to return to the 2017 contest in Tbilisi. However, Croatia was not on the final list of participants released by the EBU and did not compete in the contest.

On 3 November 2024, the broadcaster published a programme schedule that showed that HRT intended to broadcast the 2024 contest live on HRT 2 for the first time since 2014. A few days later, Tomislav Štengl, the Croatian Head of Delegation, confirmed on Dobro jutro, Hrvatska that the broadcaster was evaluating a potential return to the contest in 2025 and invisioned that the inaugural winner of the upcoming kids version of The Voice Hrvatska would be the chosen representative.

On 16 April 2025, during Kod nas doma, it was officially confirmed that Croatia will return to the contest in 2025. It was also confirmed that Marino Vrgoč, winner of The Voice Kids Hrvatska 2025, would represent Croatia in the contest. On 10 November, Vrgoč's song "Snovi" was released, and promotion of the entry included a music video. In Croatia, the contest was broadcast on HRT 2, with commentary provided by Mia Dimšić and Duško Ćurlić.

== Participation overview ==
Table key
1	First place
3	Third place
◁	Last place

Year	Artist	Song	Language	Place	Points
2003	Dino Jelusić	"Ti si moja prva ljubav"	Croatian	1	134
2004	Nika Turković	"Hej mali"	Croatian	3	126
2005	Lorena Jelusić	"Rock Baby"	Croatian	12	36
2006	Mateo Đido	"Lea"	Croatian	10	50
2014	Josie	"Game Over"	Croatian, English	16 ◁	13
2025	Marino Vrgoč	"Snovi"	Croatian	14	70

== Commentators and spokespersons ==
The contests are broadcast online worldwide through the official Junior Eurovision Song Contest website junioreurovision.tv and YouTube. In 2015, the online broadcasts featured commentary in English by junioreurovision.tv editor Luke Fisher and 2011 Bulgarian Junior Eurovision Song Contest entrant Ivan Ivanov. The Croatian broadcaster, HRT, sent their own commentator to each contest in order to provide commentary in Croatian. Spokespersons were also chosen by the national broadcaster in order to announce the awarding points from Croatia. The table below list the details of each commentator and spokesperson since 2003.

Year	Channel	Commentator	Spokesperson	Ref.
2003	HRT 1	Unknown	Unknown	
2004	HRT 1	Unknown	Buga	
2005	HRT 1	Unknown	Nika Turković	
2006	HRT Plus	Unknown	Lorena Jelusić	
2007–2013	No broadcast		Did not participate	—N/a
2014	HRT 2	Ivan Planinić and Aljoša Šerić	Sarah	
2015–2023	No broadcast		Did not participate	—N/a
2024	HRT 2	Nika Turković and Duško Ćurlić	Did not participate	
2025	HRT 2	Mia Dimšić and Duško Ćurlić	Sara Zeba	
2026	No broadcast		Did not participate	—N/a

== See also ==
- Croatia in the Eurovision Song Contest – Senior version of the Junior Eurovision Song Contest.
