= Portugal in the Eurovision Song Contest 2027 =

- Eurovision Song Contest 2027
- Participating broadcaster: Rádio e Televisão de Portugal (RTP)
- Country: Portugal
- Selection process: Festival da Canção 2027
- Selection date: 6 March 2027

Participation chronology

Portugal will be represented at the Eurovision Song Contest 2027, which will be held in Burgas, Bulgaria. The Portuguese participating broadcaster, Rádio e Televisão de Portugal (RTP), will select its entry during the traditional national selection competition Festival da Canção.

== Background ==
Prior to the 2027 contest, Radiotelevisão Portuguesa (RTP) until 2003, and Rádio e Televisão de Portugal (RTP) since 2004, have participated in the Eurovision Song Contest representing Portugal fifty-seven times since their first entry in 1964. They had won the contest on one occasion: in 2017 with the song "Amar pelos dois" performed by Salvador Sobral. Since the introduction of semi-finals to the format of the contest in 2004, Portugal has thus far managed to qualify to the final on nine occasions, the latest being in 2025, when "Deslocado" performed by Napa ultimately placed 21st in the final.

As part of its duties as participating broadcaster, RTP organises the selection of its entry in the Eurovision Song Contest and broadcasts the event in the country. The broadcaster had traditionally selected its entry for the contest via the music competition Festival da Canção, with exceptions in 1988 and 2005 when the entries were internally selected. RTP confirmed its participation in the 2027 contest on 28 October 2026.

== Before Eurovision ==
=== Festival da Canção 2027 ===
Festival da Canção 2027 will be the 61st edition of Festival da Canção. Sixteen entries will compete in the festival, consisting of a grand final on 6 March 2027. The event will be broadcast on RTP1.

==== Competing entries ====
On 28 October 2026, RTP announced that, for the first time since 2011, all 16 entries would be selected from the open submissions. The broadcaster opened an application period for interested artists and composers to submit their applications on 1 November 2026, lasting until 30 November 2026.

==== Final ====
The final will take place on 6 March 2027 and will feature sixteen entries.

== At Eurovision ==
The Eurovision Song Contest 2027 will take place at the Arena Burgas in Burgas, Bulgaria, and consist of two semi-finals held on the respective dates of 11 and 13 May and the final on 15 May 2026. All nations with the exception of the host country (Bulgaria) and the "Big Four"(France, Germany, Italy and the United Kingdom) will be required to qualify from one of two semi-finals in order to compete for the final; the top ten countries from each semi-final will progress to the final.
