= Napa (band) =

Portuguese indie pop band

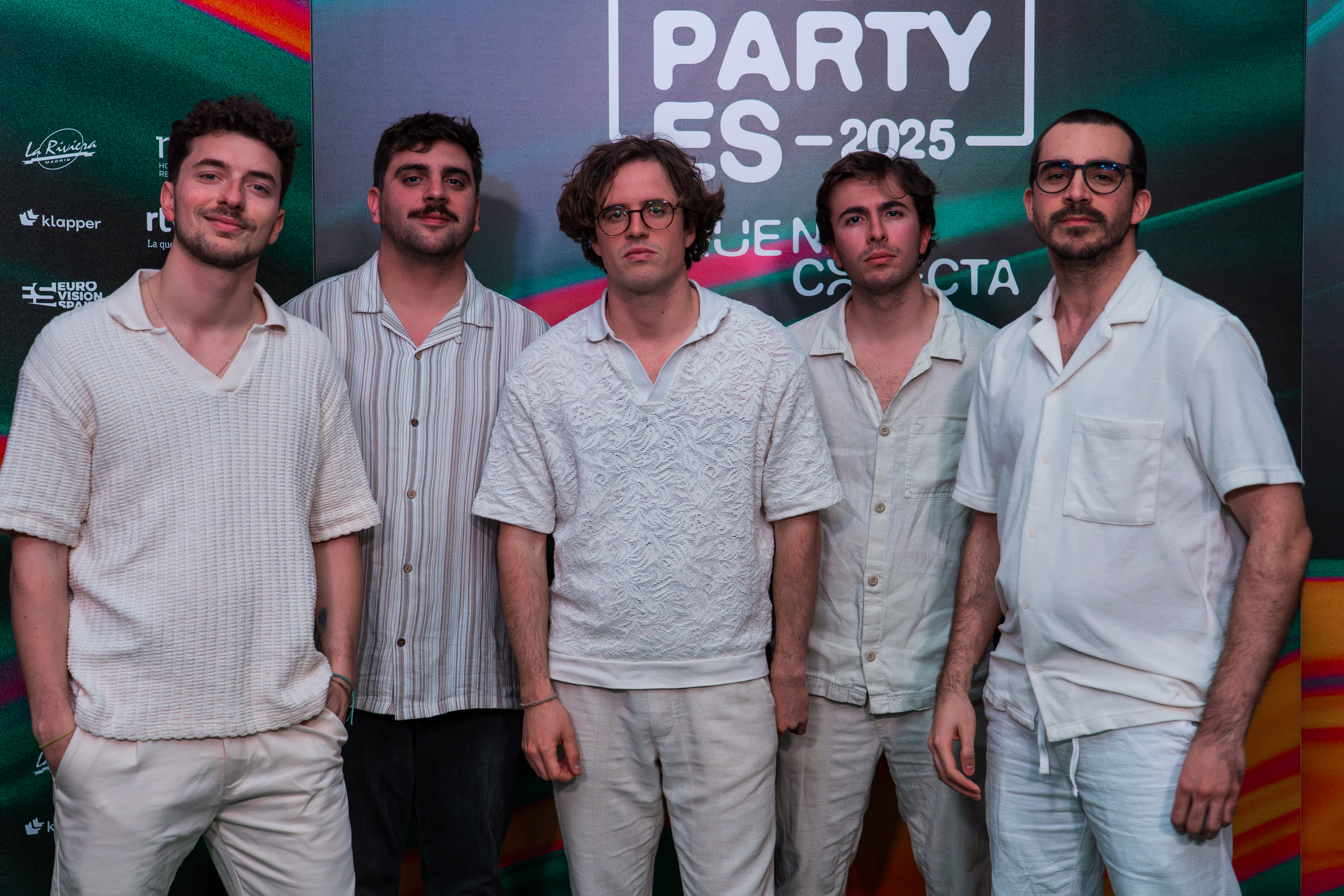
- Napa in 2025

Background information
- Origin: Madeira, Portugal
- Genres: Indie pop; indie rock
- Years active: 2013–present
- Label: Universal
- Members: Francisco Sousa; João Rodrigues; João Guilherme Gomes; João Lourenço Gomes; Diogo Góis
- Past members: Tiago Rodrigues; Bernardo Rodrigues

Napa (Portuguese pronunciation: [ˈnapɐ]; stylised in all caps) is a Portuguese indie band from Madeira consisting of Francisco Sousa, João Rodrigues, João Guilherme Gomes, João Lourenço Gomes, and Diogo Góis. They represented Portugal in the Eurovision Song Contest 2025 with the song "Deslocado", finishing in 21st place overall with 50 points.

== Career ==
=== 2013–2024: Beginnings, first two albums ===
Formed in 2013 on the island of Madeira, Napa started under the name Men on the Couch. Citing Arctic Monkeys, Red Hot Chili Peppers, and the Beatles as their influences, they began their compositions in English and recorded their songs in one of the band members' grandmother's basement. In 2019, they released their first album, Senso comum, recorded at BlackSheep Studios in Sintra. The project was financed through a crowdfunding campaign, which raised around €3,500 without support from publishers.

In 2023, the band released their second album, Logo se vê. It was then that the band changed their name to Napa, a fabric commonly used to cover couches. The name was suggested by their producer who happened to be sitting on one at the time. This rebranding followed the band's creative decision to switch from writing and performing in English to Portuguese, a change they felt was better suited to their new material. In 2024, the band performed their first national tour. They later released the concert film entitled O Mundo Continua a Girar, recorded over two sold-out nights at the Maria Matos Theatre.

=== 2025–present: Festival da Canção and Eurovision ===
On 23 January 2025, Napa was officially announced to compete in Festival da Canção. "Deslocado" was drawn to compete in the second semi-final, and was later announced as one of the six qualifiers, winning the semi-final with 20 points. The song performed seventh at the final on 8 March 2025, winning the final with 17 points, scoring the 7 points from the expert jury and 10 points from the public televote, and earning the privilege to represent Portugal at the Eurovision Song Contest 2025. After the song's release, "Deslocado" became popular in Portugal, specifically on the video sharing platform TikTok, where several displaced and migrant young people made videos about their experiences.

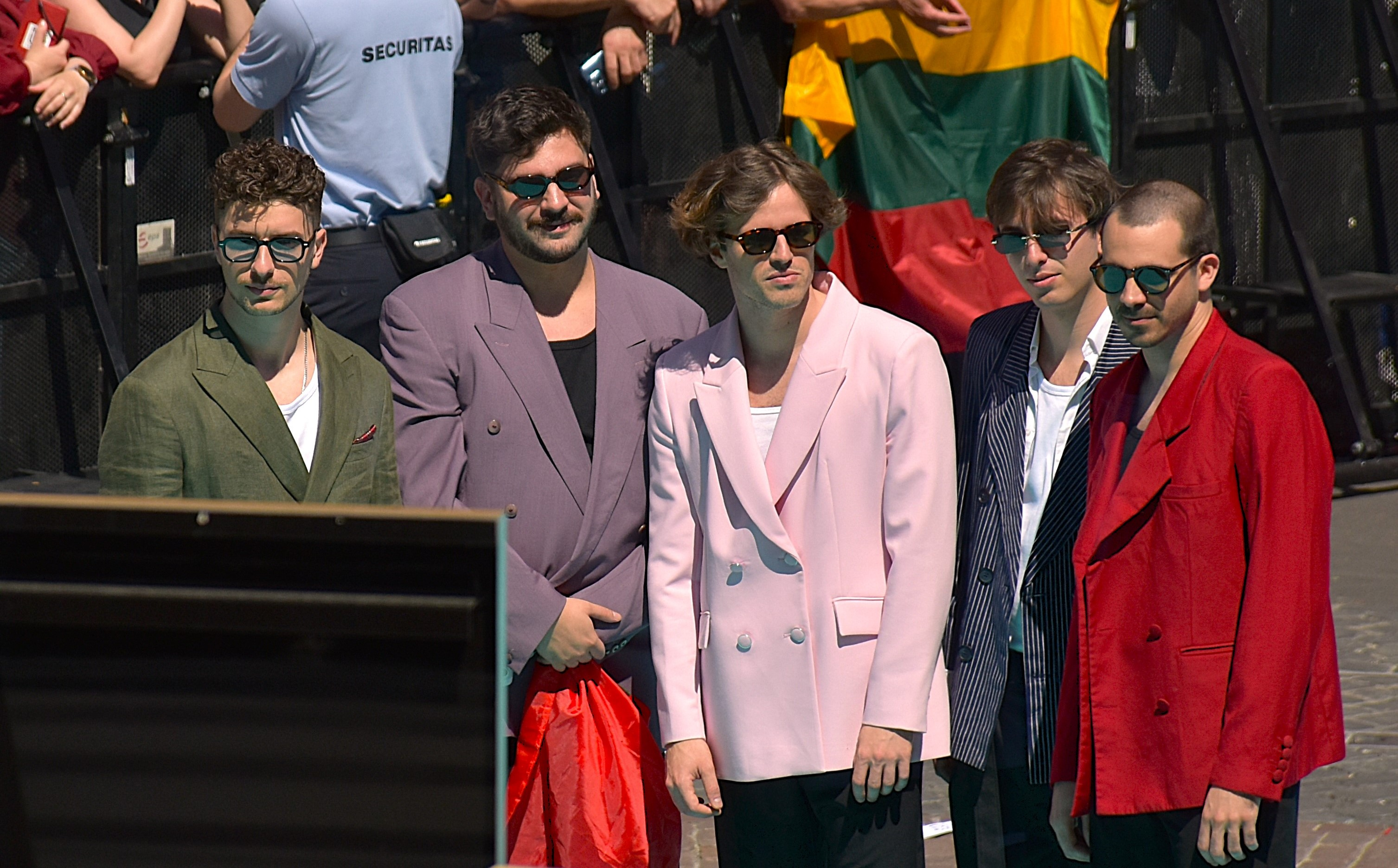
Napa on the 2025 Eurovision Turquoise Carpet in Basel

At Eurovision, Napa was drawn to compete in the first semi-final. They qualified ninth, scoring 56 points and securing a position in the grand final. At the grand final, the band finished 21st with 50 points, with a split score of 37 points from the juries and 13 points from public televoting. After the contest, the song went viral again on TikTok and later entered the Spotify's Global Viral charts.

Napa performed at the São Vicente Festival on 26 August 2025 and the Meo Sons do Mar Festival, which took place in 5 September 2025 at Santa Catarina Park in Funchal. Later, the band received two nominations at the 2025 Portuguese Golden Globes, namely for Best Song with "Deslocado" and Newcomer of the Year. In November, they performed their first international concerts at the Grand Social in Dublin, Dingwalls in London, and Las Ventas in Madrid. The following month, Napa was named "Figures of the Year" by the Portuguese cable news channel SIC Notícias and newspaper JM in the National Culture category.

Napa organised a concert on 24 and 30 January 2026, titled Napa ao vivo nos coliseus, held at Coliseu do Porto and Coliseu dos Recreios, respectively. In June 2026, the band performed in two music festivals, namely Primavera Sound held at Parque da Cidade in Porto, and Rock in Rio Lisboa held at Taguspark in Greater Lisbon.

== Members ==
The current and former members of Napa are as follows:

Current members

- João Guilherme Gomes – lead vocals and guitar
- Francisco Sousa – guitar
- Diogo Góis – bass
- João Lourenço Gomes – piano (born 6 April 2004)
- João Rodrigues – drums

Former members

- Tiago Rodrigues – drums
- Bernardo Rodrigues – percussionist

== Discography ==
=== Studio albums ===
List of studio albums, with selected details and chart positions
Title	Details	Peak chart positions
Title	Details	POR
Senso comum	Released: 11 October 2019; Label: Universal Music Portugal; Formats: LP, digital download, streaming	49
Logo se vê	Released: 26 May 2023; Label: Universal Music Portugal; Formats: LP, digital download, streaming	165
Semitrópico	Released: 16 October 2026; Label: Universal Music Portugal; Formats: LP, digital download, streaming	9

=== Singles ===
Title	Year	Peak chart positions								Certifications	Album or EP
Title	Year	POR	BOL	GRE Intl.	LTU	LUX	NLD Tip	SWE Heat.	SWI	Certifications	Album or EP
"Se eu morresse amanhã"	2019	—	—	—	—	—	—	—	—		Senso comum
"Assim, sem fim" (with Silly)	2023	—	—	—	—	—	—	—	—		Logo se vê
"Luz do túnel"	2023	—	—	—	—	—	—	—	—		Logo se vê
"Deslocado"	2025	1	25	66	8	19	9	9	59	AFP: 4× Platinum	Semitrópico
"Infinito" (with Van Zee)	2025	40	—	—	—	—	—	—	—		Non-album singles
"Amor de novo" (with Jovem Dionisio)	2025	—	—	—	—	—	—	—	—		Non-album singles
"Amor que morre"	2026	—	—	—	—	—	—	—	—		Florbela
"Sortudo"	2026	— (Note: "Sortudo" did not enter the Top 200 Singles chart, but peaked at number 28 on the Top Radio Airplay chart.)	—	—	—	—	—	—	—		Semitrópico
"Coisas simples"	2026	—	—	—	—	—	—	—	—		Semitrópico
"—" denotes a recording that did not chart or was not released in that territory.

== Awards and achievements ==
Year	Award	Category	Nominee/work	Result	Ref.
2025	Gala dos Globos de Ouro	Best Song	"Deslocado"	Nominated	
2025	Gala dos Globos de Ouro	Newcomer of the Year	Napa	Nominated	
2025	Eurovision Awards	Onstage Ensemble	Napa	Nominated	
2025	Quinto Canal Awards	Breakthrough Musical Artist	Napa	Nominated	
2025	Quinto Canal Awards	Best National Song	"Deslocado"	Nominated	
2025	JM Figures of the Year	Culture	Napa	Won	
2025	SIC Notícias Figures of the Year	National Culture	Napa	Won	
2026	Iberian Festival Awards	Best Live Performance (PT/ES); National Category	Napa at Summer Opening	Won	
2026	PLAY - Portuguese Music Awards	Vodafone Song of the Year	"Deslocado"	Nominated	
2026	PLAY - Portuguese Music Awards	Best Group	Napa	Nominated	
2026	PLAY - Portuguese Music Awards	Breakthrough Artist	Napa	Won	

== Notes ==
Awards and achievements
Preceded by Iolanda with "Grito"	Portugal in the Eurovision Song Contest; 2025	Succeeded by Bandidos do Cante with "Rosa"
