= Austria in the Eurovision Song Contest 2027 =

- Eurovision Song Contest 2027
- Participating broadcaster: Österreichischer Rundfunk (ORF)
- Country: Austria
- Selection process: Internal selection

Participation chronology

Austria will be represented at the Eurovision Song Contest 2027, which will be held in Burgas, Bulgaria. The Austrian participating broadcaster, Österreichischer Rundfunk (ORF), will internally select its entry for the contest

== Background ==
Prior to the 2027 contest, Österreichischer Rundfunk (ORF) had participated in the Eurovision Song Contest representing Austria fifty-eight times since its first entry in 1957. It had won the contest on three occasions: in 1966 with the song "Merci, Chérie" performed by Udo Jürgens, in 2014 with the song "Rise Like a Phoenix" performed by Conchita Wurst, and in 2025 with the song "Wasted Love" performed by JJ. Following the introduction of semi-finals for the 2004 contest, Austria had featured in only ten finals. Its least successful result had been last place, which it had achieved on eight occasions, most recently in 2012. It had also received nul points on four occasions; in 1962, 1988, 1991, and 2015. In 2026, "Tanzschein" by Cosmó finished twenty-fourth in the grand final.

As part of its duties as participating broadcaster, ORF organises the selection of its entry in the Eurovision Song Contest and broadcasts the event in the country. On 30 July 2026, ORF confirmed its intentions to participate at the 2027 contest and to return to internally select its entry.

== Before Eurovision ==
=== Internal selection ===
On 26 July 2026, it was reported by Austrian media that ORF has opted to return to an internal selection to select its entry for the 2027 contest; this information has confirmed by the broadcaster a few days later. ORF collaborated with music experts Cesár Sampson (who represented Austria in 2018) and Peter Schreiber on its entry for the Eurovision Song Contest 2027, with all interested artists being invited to submit their songs between 1 September and 18 September 2026. 11 entries were shortlisted for a live casting round. In November 2026, it was reported by Austrian media that five artists, including Jo Nara, Cosmus, Lena Schaur, Bamlak Werner and Lella, had been shortlisted following a live casting round at the ORF studios.

== At Eurovision ==
The Eurovision Song Contest 2027 will take place at the Arena Burgas in Burgas, Bulgaria, and consist of two semi-finals held on the respective dates of 11 and 13 May and the final on 15 May 2027. All nations with the exception of the host country (Bulgaria) and the "Big Four" (France, Germany, Italy and the United Kingdom) will be required to qualify from one of two semi-finals in order to compete for the final; the top ten countries from each semi-final will progress to the final.
