= Denmark in the Eurovision Song Contest 2027 =

- Eurovision Song Contest 2027
- Participating broadcaster: Danish Broadcasting Corporation (DR)
- Country: Denmark
- Selection process: Dansk Melodi Grand Prix 2027
- Selection date: 13 February 2027

Participation chronology

Denmark will be represented at the Eurovision Song Contest 2027,which will be held in Burgas, Bulgaria. The Danish participating broadcaster, the Danish Broadcasting Corporation (DR), will organise the national final Dansk Melodi Grand Prix 2027 in order to select its entry for the contest.

== Background ==
Prior to the 2027 contest, the Danish Broadcasting Corporation (DR) had participated in the Eurovision Song Contest representing Denmark fifty-three times since its first entry in 1957. It had won the contest, to this point, on three occasions: in 1963 with the song "Dansevise" performed by Grethe and Jørgen Ingmann, in 2000 with the song "Fly on the Wings of Love" performed by Olsen Brothers, and in 2013 with the song "Only Teardrops" performed by Emmelie de Forest. Since the introduction of semi-finals in 2004, it had failed to qualify for the final eight times.

As part of its duties as participating broadcaster, DR organises the selection of its entry in the Eurovision Song Contest and broadcasts the event in the country. On 26 June 2026, it confirmed its intentions to participate at the 2027 contest.

== Before Eurovision ==
=== Dansk Melodi Grand Prix 2027 ===
Dansk Melodi Grand Prix 2027 will be the 57th edition of Dansk Melodi Grand Prix, the music competition organised by DR to select its entries for the Eurovision Song Contest. The event will be held on 13 February 2027 at the Sydbank Arena in Kolding.

==== Format ====
Eight songs will compete in one show.

==== Competing entries ====
DR opened a submission period between 27 June and 25 October 2026. At least one of the lyricists, composers or artists must be a citizen of the Kingdom of Denmark, or have a strong connection to Denmark in order to qualify to compete.

== At Eurovision ==
The Eurovision Song Contest 2027 will take place at the Arena Burgas in Burgas, Bulgaria, and consist of two semi-finals held on the respective dates of 11 and 13 May and the final on 15 May 2026. All nations with the exception of the host country (Bulgaria) and the "Big Four" (France, Germany, Italy and the United Kingdom) will be required to qualify from one of two semi-finals in order to compete for the final; the top ten countries from each semi-final will progress to the final.
