= San Marino in the Eurovision Song Contest 2027 =

- Eurovision Song Contest 2027
- Participating broadcaster: San Marino RTV (SMRTV)
- Country: San Marino
- Selection process: San Marino Song Contest 2027
- Selection date: 6 March 2027

Participation chronology

San Marino will be represented at the Eurovision Song Contest 2027, which will be held in Burgas, Bulgaria. The Sammarinese participating broadcaster, San Marino RTV (SMRTV), will organise the national final format San Marino Song Contest to select its entry for the contest.

== Background ==
Prior to the 2027 contest, San Marino RTV (SMRTV) had participated in the Eurovision Song Contest representing San Marino 16 times since its first entry in 2008. Its debut entry, "Complice" performed by Miodio, failed to qualify for the final and placed last in the first semi-final. SMRTV subsequently did not participate in both the 2009 and 2010 contests, citing financial difficulties. It returned in 2011 with "Stand By" by Italian singer Senit, which also failed to take the country to the final. From 2012 to 2014, SMRTV sent Valentina Monetta to the contest on three consecutive occasions. Monetta's first two entries failed to qualify to the final, however in 2014, she managed to bring San Marino to the final for the first time with "Maybe", which ultimately placed 24th. Following four consecutive non-qualifying years, San Marino qualified in 2019 with "Say Na Na Na" by Serhat and finished in 19th place. Senit, under her new stage name Senhit, was to return to represent the nation with "Freaky!" at the 2020 contest, however, following the contest's cancelation, SMRTV re-appointed Senhit for 2021. Her 2021 song, "Adrenalina", performed alongside American rapper Flo Rida, qualified for the final, where it placed 22nd. The Sammarinese entries from 2022 to 2024 all failed to qualify, until "Tutta l'Italia" by Gabry Ponte qualified in 2025, ultimately getting last place in the final.

As part of its duties as a participating broadcaster, SMRTV organises the selection of its entry in the Eurovision Song Contest and broadcasts the event in the country. SMRTV confirmed its intention to participate in the 2026 contest on 3 August 2026, announcing that a third edition of San Marino Song Contest would be used to select its entry.

== Before Eurovision ==
=== San Marino Song Contest 2027 ===
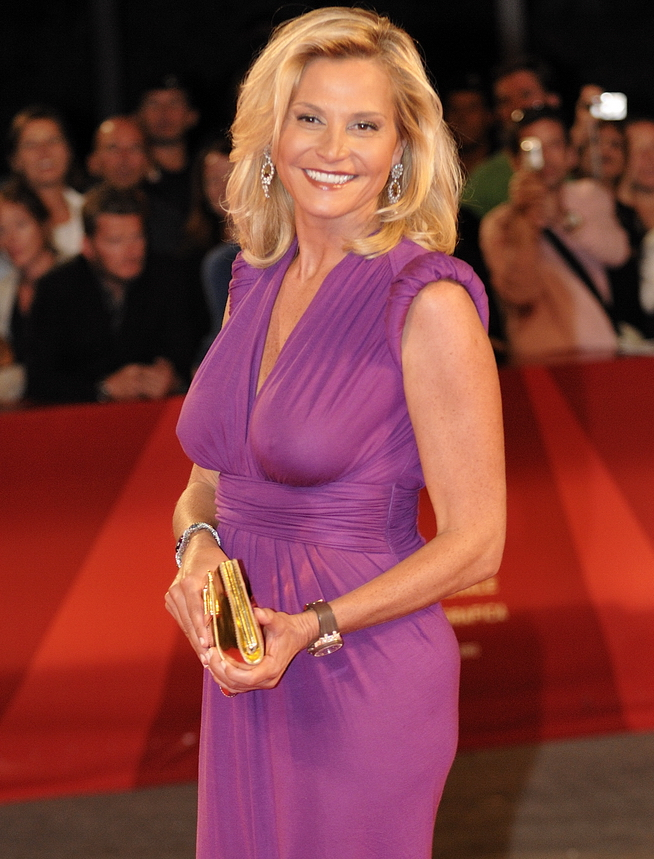
Simona Ventura will host the final round of San Marino Song Contest 2027 and was one of the two artistic director of the show.

San Marino Song Contest 2027 will be the third edition of the national selection process organised by SMRTV and the company Media Evolution. Media Evolution was responsible for the early stages of the event, titled "Dreaming San Marino Song Contest", which consisted of auditions and casting of entries and the "Stage & Live Academy" phase to select 40 semi-finalists; SMRTV organised the two semi-finals and the final to select the ultimate entrant(s). Each semi-final consisted of 20 entrants, with the top five from each proceeding to the final. The 21-participant final included the 10 finalists from the semi-finals, joined by 10 "Big Artists" as selected by SMRTV, and one wildcard reserved for singers holding Sammarinese citizenship.

The semi-finals of the contest will take place on 3 and 4 March and the final on 6 March 2027 at the Nuovo de Dogana. The Artistic Directors for the event were Massimo Bonelli and Simona Ventura.

==== Participant selection ====
A submission window for interested artists and composers was opened on 3 August 2026 by Media Evolution, with a deadline set for 25 January 2027. Live casting auditions were then held at San Marino Outlet Experience in Falciano in four rounds: the first on 9 and 10 October 2026, the second on 20 and 21 November 2026, the third on 11 and 12 December 2026. Artists not residing in San Marino, Italy or neighbouring countries were able to attend the auditions online instead of attending in person.

The casting phase was used to select 240 acts to proceed to Media Evolution's "Stage & Live Academy" phase, which consisted of eight sessions of 30 candidates each. At the end of the "Stage & Live Academy" phase, 40 entrants were selected to take part in the two 20-entrant semi-finals.

==== Semi-finals ====
The semi-finals will air on 3 and 4 March 2027 at the Teatro Nuovo in Dogana.

==== Final ====
The final will take place on 6 March 2027 at the Teatro Nuovo in Dogana and will be hosted by Simona Ventura. The winner will be selected by a five-member jury.

== At Eurovision ==
The Eurovision Song Contest 2027 will take place at the Arena Burgas in Burgas, Bulgaria, and consist of two semi-finals held on the respective dates of 11 and 13 May and the final on 15 May 2026. All nations with the exception of the host country (Bulgaria) and the "Big Four" (France, Germany, Italy and the United Kingdom) will be required to qualify from one of two semi-finals in order to compete for the final; the top ten countries from each semi-final will progress to the final.

In San Marino, all the shows of the contest were broadcast on San Marino RTV.
