= Greece in the Eurovision Song Contest 2027 =

- Eurovision Song Contest 2027
- Participating broadcaster: Hellenic Broadcasting Corporation (ERT)
- Country: Greece
- Selection process: Sing for Greece 2027
- Selection date: 13 February 2027

Participation chronology

Greece will be represented at the Eurovision Song Contest 2027, which will be held in Burgas, Bulgaria. The Greek participating broadcaster, the Hellenic Broadcasting Corporation (ERT), will organise the national final Sing for Greece 2027 in order to select its entry for the contest.

== Background ==
Prior to the 2027 contest, Greece had participated in the Eurovision Song Contest 46 times since its debut in 1974. The nation has won the contest once to this point, in 2005 with the song "My Number One" performed by Helena Paparizou. Following the introduction of semi-finals for the 2004 contest, it managed to qualify for the final with each of its entries for several years. Between 2004 and 2013, it achieved nine top ten placements in the final. The first entry to not qualify to the final was "Utopian Land" performed by Argo in 2016. Its 16th-place finish in the semi-final marked its worst placing at the contest and led to its absence from the final for the first time since 2000, when it did not send an entry. In the 2018 contest, it failed to qualify for the second time with "Oniro mou" by Yianna Terzi, finishing 14th in the semi-final, and for the third time in 2023 with "What They Say" by Victor Vernicos. In 2026, "Ferto", performed by Akylas, qualified for the final and placed tenth with 220 points.

As part of its duties as participating broadcaster, the Hellenic Broadcasting Corporation (ERT) organises the selection of its entry in the Eurovision Song Contest and broadcasts the event in the country. On 14 June 2026, ERT confirmed its intention to participate in the 2027 contest and announced that a national final would be organised to select its representative.

== Before Eurovision ==
=== Sing for Greece 2027 ===
Sing for Greece 2027 is the national final developed by ERT to select its entry for the Eurovision Song Contest 2027. It will consist of two semi-finals and a final, and will be held at the Thessaloniki Concert Hall in Thessaloniki.

==== Format ====
The competition consists of three shows: two semi-finals on 9 and 11 February 2027 and a final on 13 February 2027. Ten songs will compete in each semi-final and the top six entries will qualify to the final. The results for the semi-finals will be determined exclusively by public voting, while the results for the final will be determined by a combination of public and jury voting.

==== Competing entries ====
On 22 September 2026, ERT opened a submission period where artists and composers were able to submit their entries for consideration by 1 November 2026. A total of 234 songs were received by the end of the deadline.

== At Eurovision ==
The Eurovision Song Contest 2027 will take place at the Arena Burgas in Burgas, Bulgaria, and consist of two semi-finals held on the respective dates of 11 and 13 May and the final on 15 May 2026. All nations with the exception of the host country (Bulgaria) and the "Big Four" (France, Germany, Italy and the United Kingdom) will be required to qualify from one of two semi-finals in order to compete for the final; the top ten countries from each semi-final will progress to the final.
