= Albania in the Eurovision Song Contest 2027 =

- Eurovision Song Contest 2027
- Participating broadcaster: Radio Televizioni Shqiptar (RTSH)
- Country: Albania
- Selection process: Festivali i Këngës 65
- Selection date: 20 December 2026

Participation chronology

Albania is set to be represented at the Eurovision Song Contest 2027, which will be held in Burgas, Bulgaria. The Albanian participating broadcaster, Radio Televizioni Shqiptar (RTSH), will select its entry through its national selection competition Festivali i Këngës.

== Background ==
Prior to the 2027 contest, Radio Televizioni Shqiptar (RTSH) participated in the Eurovision Song Contest representing Albania 22 times since its first entry in 2004. Its highest placing in the contest, to this point, had been fifth place, which was achieved in 2012 with the song "Suus" performed by Rona Nishliu. It accomplished its second-highest placement at its first appearance in 2004, with "The Image of You" performed by Anjeza Shahini finishing seventh. During its tenure in the contest, the nation failed to qualify for the final eight times. In 2026, "Nân" performed by Alis qualified for the final and placed thirteenth.

As part of its duties as participating broadcaster, RTSH broadcasts the event in Albania and organises Festivali i Këngës, an annual music competition which has been consistently used as its national selection format since its 2004 debut. On 15 October 2026, RTSH confirmed its intention to participate in the 2027 contest, announcing that Festivali i Këngës would again be used to select its entry.

== Before Eurovision ==
=== Festivali i Këngës 65 ===
The Albanian representative for the Eurovision Song Contest 2027 is set to be selected during the 65th edition of Festivali i Këngës, an annual music competition organised by RTSH at the Palace of Congresses in Tirana. The event will take place between 17 and 20 December 2026.

The broadcaster opened an application period for interested artists and composers to submit their applications on 22 September 2025, lasting until 27 September 2026, and ultimately selected 28 contestants.

==== Final ====
The final will take place on 20 December 2026.

== At Eurovision ==
The Eurovision Song Contest 2027 will take place at the Arena Burgas in Burgas, Bulgaria, and consist of two semi-finals held on the respective dates of 11 and 13 May and the final on 15 May 2026. All nations with the exception of the host country (Bulgaria) and the "Big Four" (France, Germany, Italy and the United Kingdom) will be required to qualify from one of two semi-finals in order to compete for the final; the top ten countries from each semi-final will progress to the final.
