= Portugal in the Eurovision Song Contest 2025 =

- Eurovision Song Contest 2025
- Participating broadcaster: Rádio e Televisão de Portugal (RTP)
- Country: Portugal
- Selection process: Festival da Canção 2025
- Selection date: 8 March 2025

Competing entry
- Song: "Deslocado"
- Artist: Napa
- Songwriters: João Lourenço Gomes; João Rodrigues; Diogo Góis; Francisco Sousa; André Santos; Guilherme Gomes

Placement
- Semi-final result: Qualified (9th, 56 points)
- Final result: 21st, 50 points

Participation chronology

Portugal was represented at the Eurovision Song Contest 2025 with the song "Deslocado", performed by Napa and written by its members João Lourenço Gomes, João Rodrigues, Diogo Góis, Francisco Sousa, André Santos, and Guilherme Gomes. The Portuguese participating broadcaster, Rádio e Televisão de Portugal (RTP) organised the national final Festival da Canção 2025 in order to select its entry for the contest.

Portugal successfully qualified for the Grand Final during the first semi-final on 13 May with 56 points, placing ninth. Performing in position 21, Portugal placed twenty-first out of the 26 performing countries with 50 points, obtaining 13 points from the Public and 37 points from the Jury.

== Background ==
Prior to the 2025 contest, Radiotelevisão Portuguesa (RTP) until 2003, and Rádio e Televisão de Portugal (RTP) since 2004, have participated in the Eurovision Song Contest representing Portugal fifty-five times since their first entry in 1964. They had won the contest on one occasion: in 2017 with the song "Amar pelos dois" performed by Salvador Sobral. Since the introduction of semi-finals to the format of the contest in 2004, Portugal has thus far managed to qualify to the final on eight occasions, the latest being in 2024, when "Grito" performed by Iolanda ultimately placed 10th in the final.

As part of its duties as participating broadcaster, RTP organises the selection of its entry in the Eurovision Song Contest and broadcasts the event in the country. The broadcaster had traditionally selected its entry for the contest via the music competition Festival da Canção, with exceptions in 1988 and 2005 when the entries were internally selected. RTP confirmed its participation in the 2025 contest on 14 August 2024, announcing the organisation of the 59th Festival da Canção in order to select its 2025 entry.

== Before Eurovision ==
=== Festival da Canção 2025 ===
Festival da Canção 2025 was the 59th edition of Festival da Canção organised by RTP to select its entry for the Eurovision Song Contest 2025. 20 entries competed in the selection that consisted of two semi-finals held on 22 February and 1 March 2025 leading to a 12-song final on 8 March 2025. All three shows were broadcast on RTP1, RTP África, and RTP Internacional as well as on radio via Antena 1 and online via RTP Play.

==== Format ====
The format of the competition consisted of three shows: two semi-finals and a final. Each semi-final featured 10 competing entries from which six advanced from each show to complete the 12-song lineup in the final. Results during the semi-finals were determined by the votes from a jury panel appointed by RTP and public televoting; the first five qualifiers were based on the 50/50 combination of jury and public voting where both streams of voting assigned points from 1–8, 10 and 12 based on ranking, while the sixth qualifier was determined by a second round of public televoting from the remaining entries. Results during the final were determined by the 50/50 combination of votes from seven regional juries and public televoting. Both the public televote and the juries assigned points from 1–8, 10, and 12 based on the ranking developed by both streams of voting.

==== Competing entries ====
20 composers were selected by RTP through two methods: 14 invited by RTP for the competition and six selected from 633 submissions received through an open call for songs between 14 August and 15 October 2024. The composers, which both created the songs and selected its performers, were required to submit the demo and final versions of their entries by 31 October and 30 November 2024, respectively. Songs could be submitted in any language. The selected composers were revealed on 5 November 2024, while the competing artists were revealed on 23 January 2025.

Artist	Song	Songwriter(s)	Selection
A Cantadeira	"Responso à mulher"	Joana Negrão	Invited by RTP
Bluay	"Ninguém"	José Carlos Coelho Almeida Tavares; Francisco Murta	Invited by RTP
Bombazine	"Apago tudo"	Filipe Andrade; Manuel Figueiredo; Manuel Granate; Manuel Protásio; Vasco Granate	Invited by RTP
Capital da Bulgária	"Lisboa"	Sofia Reis	Open call winner
Diana Vilarinho	"Cotovia"	Diana Vilarinho; Joana Alegre; Ricardo Ribeiro	Open call winner
Du Nothin	"Sobre nós"	Bruno "Beato" Vasconcelos; Jorge Ferreira	Invited by RTP
Emmy Curl	"Rapsódia da paz"	Catarina Miranda; Marília Miranda	Invited by RTP
Fernando Daniel	"Medo"	Diana Lima; Fernando Daniel	Invited by RTP
Henka	"I Wanna Destroy U"	Cat Pereira; Jon Cassidy; Meyrick de la Fuente; Mirza Radonjica	Open call winner
Inês Marques Lucas	"Quantos queres"	Inês Marques Lucas	Open call winner
Jéssica Pina	"Calafrio"	Jéssica Pina	Invited by RTP
Josh	"Tristeza"	João Duarte; João Gaspar	Open call winner
Luca Argel feat. Pri Azevedo	"Quem foi?"	Luca Argel	Invited by RTP
Marco Rodrigues	"A minha casa"	Marco Rodrigues; Tiago Machado	Invited by RTP
Margarida Campelo	"Eu sei que o amor"	Ana Cláudia; Beatriz Pessoa; Margarida Campelo	Invited by RTP
Napa	"Deslocado"	João Lourenço Gomes; João Rodrigues; Diogo Góis; Francisco Sousa; André Santos; Guilherme Gomes	Invited by RTP
Peculiar	"Adamastor"	João Nicolau Quintela	Invited by RTP
Rita Sampaio	"Voltas"	Rita Sampaio; Tiago Sampaio	Invited by RTP
Tota	"Á-tê-xis"	Euclides Gomes; Jónatas "Tota" Pereira	Invited by RTP
Xico Gaiato	"Ai senhor!"	Constantino Matos; Tiago Matos; Xico Gaiato	Open call winner

==== Semi-finals ====
The semi-finals took place on 22 February and 1 March 2025. In each show, ten entries competed, with six advancing to the final. The voting occurred in two rounds: a 50/50 combination of votes from an expert jury and a public televote determined the first five qualifiers, and a second round of televoting determined the sixth and final qualifier.

Key: Jury and televote round qualifier Televote-only round qualifier

Semi-final 1 – First round – 22 February 2025
R/O	Artist	Song	Jury	Televote		Total	Place
R/O	Artist	Song	Jury	Percentage	Points	Total	Place
1	Xico Gaiato	"Ai senhor!"	5	12.24%	7	12	8
2	Rita Sampaio	"Voltas"	1	2.89%	1	2	10
3	Du Nothin	"Sobre nós"	4	6.83%	2	6	9
4	Marco Rodrigues	"A minha casa"	2	13.63%	12	14	4
5	Margarida Campelo	"Eu sei que o amor"	12	7.34%	3	15	1
6	Josh	"Tristeza"	7	11.97%	6	13	5
7	Capital da Bulgária	"Lisboa"	8	8.34%	4	12	7
8	Bluay	"Ninguém"	10	10.89%	5	15	2
9	Jéssica Pina	"Calafrio"	6	12.59%	8	14	3
10	Peculiar	"Adamastor"	3	13.28%	10	13	6

Semi-final 1 – Second round – 22 February 2025
Artist	Song	Televote	Place
Capital da Bulgária	"Lisboa"	15.11%	3
Du Nothin	"Sobre nós"	14.90%	4
Peculiar	"Adamastor"	43.63%	1
Rita Sampaio	"Voltas"	7.27%	5
Xico Gaiato	"Ai senhor!"	19.09%	2

Semi-final 2 – First round – 1 March 2025
R/O	Artist	Song	Jury	Televote		Total	Place
R/O	Artist	Song	Jury	Percentage	Points	Total	Place
1	A Cantadeira	"Responso à mulher"	1	5.32%	5	6	10
2	Tota	"Á-tê-xis"	6	2.07%	1	7	8
3	Bombazine	"Apago tudo"	7	13.6%	7	14	3
4	Emmy Curl	"Rapsódia da paz"	10	2.61%	3	13	4
5	Inês Marques Lucas	"Quantos queres"	5	3.76%	4	9	7
6	Fernando Daniel	"Medo"	3	18.88%	10	13	5
7	Luca Argel feat. Pri Azevedo	"Quem foi?"	4	2.50%	2	6	9
8	Napa	"Deslocado"	8	25.70%	12	20	1
9	Diana Vilarinho	"Cotovia"	12	7.66%	6	18	2
10	Henka	"I Wanna Destroy U"	2	18.23%	8	10	6

Semi-final 2 – Second round – 1 March 2025
Artist	Song	Televote	Place
A Cantadeira	"Responso à mulher"	17.82%	2
Henka	"I Wanna Destroy U"	53.58%	1
Inês Marques Lucas	"Quantos queres"	12.44%	3
Luca Argel feat. Pri Azevedo	"Quem foi?"	9.51%	4
Tota	"Á-tê-xis"	6.65%	5

==== Final ====
The final took place on 8 March 2025. The winner was selected based on the 50/50 combination of votes from seven three-member regional juries (one for each of the regions of Portugal) and from a public televote open throughout the week preceding the show; in the event of a tie, the public voting would take precedence.

Final – 8 March 2025
R/O	Artist	Song	Jury		Televote		Total	Place
R/O	Artist	Song	Votes	Points	Percentage	Points	Total	Place
1	Bombazine	"Apago tudo"	27	2	5.98%	6	8	7
2	Margarida Campelo	"Eu sei que o amor"	37	6	1.00%	0	6	9
3	Henka	"I Wanna Destroy U"	18	0	29.83%	12	12	4
4	Bluay	"Ninguém"	16	0	1.82%	1	1	12
5	Jéssica Pina	"Calafrio"	52	10	2.19%	2	12	6
6	Marco Rodrigues	"A minha casa"	28	3	3.24%	4	7	8
7	Napa	"Deslocado"	38	7	21.14%	10	17	1
8	Peculiar	"Adamastor"	26	1	2.78%	3	4	10
9	Fernando Daniel	"Medo"	42	8	15.57%	8	16	3
10	Emmy Curl	"Rapsódia da paz"	31	4	1.80%	0	4	11
11	Josh	"Tristeza"	34	5	8.74%	7	12	5
12	Diana Vilarinho	"Cotovia"	57	12	5.91%	5	17	2

Detailed regional jury votes
R/O	Song	North	Central	Lisbon Area	Alentejo	Algarve	Madeira	Azores	Total
1	"Apago tudo"	1	3	4	6	1		12	27
2	"Eu sei que o amor"	8	2	6	4	4	7	6	37
3	"I Wanna Destroy U"	10	5		1		2		18
4	"Ninguém"		4	1	3	3	1	4	16
5	"Calafrio"	3	6	7	12	8	8	8	52
6	"A minha casa"			12	7	2	6	1	28
7	"Deslocado"	2	7	5	5		12	7	38
8	"Adamastor"	12				12		2	26
9	"Medo"	7	10	8	8	6	3		42
10	"Rapsódia da paz"	5	1	3	2	5	5	10	31
11	"Tristeza"	6	12	2		7	4	3	34
12	"Cotovia"	4	8	10	10	10	10	5	57

==== Official album ====
Cover art of the official compilation album

Festival da Canção 2025 is the official compilation album of the contest. It was compiled by Sony Music Entertainment Portugal and was digitally released by the former on 23 January 2025. The album features the twenty participating entries of the contest.

Weekly chart performance for Festival da Canção 2025
Chart (2025)	Peak position
Portuguese Albums (AFP)	19

== At Eurovision ==
The Eurovision Song Contest 2025 took place at St. Jakobshalle in Basel, Switzerland, and consisted of two semi-finals held on the respective dates of 13 and 15 May and the final on 17 May 2025. During the allocation draw held on 28 January 2025, Portugal was drawn to compete in the first semi-final, performing in the first half of the show. Napa was later drawn to perform 7th, ahead of Sweden's KAJ and before Norway's Kyle Alessandro.

After placing ninth with 56 points, Portugal qualified for the Grand Final. This was despite predictions that they would not qualify, with most bookmakers giving them 6/1 odds and an overall qualifying chance of 14%, placing them last (fifteenth) in the rankings. Performing twenty-first out of 26 performances in the Grand Final, Napa's 'Deslocado' received 13 points from the Public and 37 points from the Jury, placing Portugal twenty-first overall.

Portugal's Eurovision 2025 Spokesperson was announced on 15 May 2025 as Iolanda, who announced Portugal's jury votes in the Grand Final of the contest. Iolanda, who represented Portugal in Eurovision 2024 with her song 'grito', also performed a rendition of Céline Dion's 1988 Swiss winning entry "Ne partez pas sans moi" as a guest performer during the first semi-final, alongside former Eurovision contestants Jerry Heil (Ukraine 2024), Marina Satti (Greece 2024) and Silvester Belt (Lithuania 2024).

=== Voting ===
==== Points awarded to Portugal ====
Points awarded to Portugal (Semi-final 1)
Score	Televote
12 points	
10 points	
8 points	Switzerland
7 points	Spain; Ukraine
6 points	Estonia
5 points	Rest of the World
4 points	San Marino (Note: San Marino uses a jury in the semi-finals.)
3 points	Belgium; Netherlands; Norway; Poland; Slovenia
2 points	Sweden
1 point	Iceland; Italy

Points awarded to Portugal (Final)
Score	Televote	Jury
12 points		
10 points		
8 points	Luxembourg	
7 points		Netherlands
6 points		Azerbaijan; Lithuania; San Marino
5 points	France	
4 points		Czechia; Ukraine
3 points		
2 points		Switzerland
1 point		Albania; Slovenia

==== Points awarded by Portugal ====
Points awarded by Portugal (Semi-final 1)
Score	Televote
12 points	Ukraine
10 points	Netherlands
8 points	Albania
7 points	Sweden
6 points	Estonia
5 points	Cyprus
4 points	Poland
3 points	Norway
2 points	Iceland
1 point	San Marino

Points awarded by Portugal (Final)
Score	Televote	Jury
12 points	Israel	Italy
10 points	Ukraine	Switzerland
8 points	Italy	Ukraine
7 points	Austria	Latvia
6 points	Spain	Austria
5 points	France	Netherlands
4 points	Sweden	Albania
3 points	Netherlands	Estonia
2 points	Albania	United Kingdom
1 point	Estonia	Greece

==== Detailed voting results ====
Each participating broadcaster assembles a five-member jury panel consisting of music industry professionals who are citizens of the country they represent. Each jury, and individual jury member, is required to meet a strict set of criteria regarding professional background, as well as diversity in gender and age. No member of a national jury was permitted to be related in any way to any of the competing acts in such a way that they cannot vote impartially and independently. The individual rankings of each jury member as well as the nation's televoting results were released shortly after the grand final.

The following members comprised the Portuguese jury:

- Alberto Hernández Seruca
- Alexandre Manuel Valério Mesquita Guimarães
- Luís Oliveira Nunes
- Lia Isabel Pereira
- Nádia Lima Pereira

Detailed voting results from Portugal (Semi-final 1)
R/O	Country	Televote	
R/O	Country	Rank	Points
01	Iceland	9	2
02	Poland	7	4
03	Slovenia	11	
04	Estonia	5	6
05	Ukraine	1	12
06	Sweden	4	7
07	Portugal		
08	Norway	8	3
09	Belgium	12	
10	Azerbaijan	13	
11	San Marino	10	1
12	Albania	3	8
13	Netherlands	2	10
14	Croatia	14	
15	Cyprus	6	5

Detailed voting results from Portugal (Final)
R/O	Country	Jury							Televote	
R/O	Country	Juror A	Juror B	Juror C	Juror D	Juror E	Rank	Points	Rank	Points
01	Norway	11	20	17	23	12	18		17	
02	Luxembourg	9	13	21	18	6	15		20	
03	Estonia	12	2	8	19	11	8	3	10	1
04	Israel	13	18	25	22	25	23		1	12
05	Lithuania	15	11	7	13	7	13		14	
06	Spain	19	16	18	14	13	19		5	6
07	Ukraine	2	5	4	3	9	3	8	2	10
08	United Kingdom	16	10	19	5	5	9	2	22	
09	Austria	10	4	6	15	3	5	6	4	7
10	Iceland	18	25	24	25	17	24		19	
11	Latvia	7	7	3	2	14	4	7	16	
12	Netherlands	4	9	11	6	8	6	5	8	3
13	Finland	20	15	22	11	23	20		13	
14	Italy	3	1	2	1	1	1	12	3	8
15	Poland	5	23	20	20	24	16		12	
16	Germany	21	22	15	7	15	17		15	
17	Greece	6	19	14	16	4	10	1	18	
18	Armenia	22	17	5	8	16	14		21	
19	Switzerland	8	6	1	4	2	2	10	11	
20	Malta	25	14	16	21	18	22		24	
21	Portugal									
22	Denmark	23	21	12	17	19	21		23	
23	Sweden	24	3	10	12	20	11		7	4
24	France	14	8	9	9	10	12		6	5
25	San Marino	17	24	23	24	22	25		25	
26	Albania	1	12	13	10	21	7	4	9	2
