= Luxembourg in the Eurovision Song Contest 2027 =

- Eurovision Song Contest 2027
- Participating broadcaster: RTL Lëtzebuerg (RTL)
- Country: Luxembourg
- Selection process: Luxembourg Song Contest 2027
- Selection date: 30 January 2027

Participation chronology

Luxembourg is set to be represented at the Eurovision Song Contest 2027, which will be held in Burgas, Bulgaria. The Luxembourgish participating broadcaster, RTL Lëtzebuerg (RTL), will organise the Luxembourg Song Contest 2027 in order to select its entry for the contest.

== Background ==
Prior to the 2027 contest, RTL Lëtzebuerg (RTL), formerly as Compagnie Luxembourgeoise de Télédiffusion (CLT), had participated in the Eurovision Song Contest representing Luxembourg 40 times since debuting in its first edition of 1956. It had won the contest on five occasions: in 1961 with "Nous les amoureux" performed by Jean-Claude Pascal, in 1965 with "Poupée de cire, poupée de son" performed by France Gall, in 1972 with "Après toi" performed by Vicky Leandros, in 1973 with "Tu te reconnaîtras" performed by Anne-Marie David, and in 1983 with "Si la vie est cadeau" performed by Corinne Hermès. Following a 31-year absence, Luxembourg under RTL returned to the contest in 2024 where it qualified to the final and placed 13th with the song "Fighter" performed by Tali. It also qualified to the final in 2025 and placed 22nd with the song "La poupée monte le son" performed by Laura Thorn. In 2026, Luxembourg was represented by Eva Marija and the song "Mother Nature". The country ended in twelfth place in the second semi-final with 60 points, therefore failing to qualify for the final for the first time.

== Before Eurovision ==
=== Luxembourg Song Contest 2027 ===
Luxembourg Song Contest 2027 was the competition organised by RTL to select its entry for the Eurovision Song Contest 2027. The competition featured eight acts and took place on 30 January 2027 at the Rockhal in Esch-sur-Alzette.

==== Competing entries ====
On 9 July 2026, RTL opened a submission period for interested artists and songwriters to submit their applications in one or more of three categories: the first for performers, the second for songwriters. Artists were required to be at least 18 years old by 24 January 2026 and have Luxembourg nationality, have lived in Luxembourg for three consecutive years, or have a strong link with the Luxembourg cultural scene. Songwriters could be of any nationality. The application deadline for the second category concluded on 29 October 2026, while the application deadline for the first category concluded on 20 September 2026. A total of 821 songs were received by the end of the deadline, the highest number of songs submitted for a Luxembourgish selection.

Auditions were held on 16, 17 and 18 October 2026 at the RTL headquarters in Luxembourg City, where an international jury panel evaluated the selected performers. 80 artists took part in in-person auditions, of which 12 were selected for the final phase of the selection.

Final audition round artists
- Carmen Luisa
- Clement Lerat
- Debbie M
- Gaïa
- Hugo One
- Jaya
- Kim
- Layso Roy
- Marco Misolic
- Maya Maunet
- Patricia Venâncio
- Perrine Thomas

After the song submission period concluded, a pairing workshop was made on 6 and 7 October 2026, where the twelve shortlisted acts were matched with a song. The eight participating acts were announced on 18 November 2026, including Hugo One who competed in the 2026 edition of the Luxembourg Song Contest.

Artist	Song	Songwriter(s)
Debbie M		
Hugo One		
Jaya		Julien Salvia; Ludovic-Alexandre Vidal
Kim		Christopher Rohde-Frisk; Jonas Thander; Malthe Johansen; Marcus Winther-John; Sissal
Layso Roy		
Maya Maunet		
Patricia Venancio		
Perrine Thomas		

== At Eurovision ==
The Eurovision Song Contest 2027 will take place at the Arena Burgas in Burgas, Bulgaria, and consist of two semi-finals held on the respective dates of 11 and 13 May and the final on 15 May 2026. All nations with the exception of the host country (Bulgaria) and the "Big Four" (France, Germany, Italy and the United Kingdom) will be required to qualify from one of two semi-finals in order to compete for the final; the top ten countries from each semi-final will progress to the final.
