= Ukraine in the Eurovision Song Contest 2027 =

- Eurovision Song Contest 2027
- Participating broadcaster: Public Broadcasting Company of Ukraine (Suspilne)
- Country: Ukraine
- Selection process: Vidbir 2027
- Selection date: February 2027

Participation chronology

Ukraine will be represented at the Eurovision Song Contest 2027, which will be held in Burgas, Bulgaria. The Ukrainian participating broadcaster, Suspilne, organised the national final Vidbir 2027 in order to select its entry for the contest.

== Background ==
Prior to the 2027 contest, the National Television Company of Ukraine (NTU) until 2016, and Suspilne since 2017, had participated in the Eurovision Song Contest representing Ukraine 21 times since NTU's first entry in 2003. It had won the contest on three occasions: in 2004 with the song "Wild Dances" performed by Ruslana, in 2016 with "1944" by Jamala, and in 2022 with the song "Stefania" performed by Kalush Orchestra. It had been the runner-up in the contest on two occasions: in 2007 with the song "Dancing Lasha Tumbai" performed by Verka Serduchka and in 2008 with the song "Shady Lady" performed by Ani Lorak. Following the introduction of semi-finals in 2004, Ukraine had managed to qualify to final in every contest it participated in thus far. Its least successful result had been 24th place, which was achieved in 2017 with the song "Time" performed by O.Torvald. In September 2026, Suspilne confirmed its intention to participate at the 2027 contest.

== Before Eurovision ==
=== Vidbir 2027 ===
Vidbir 2026 was the eleventh edition of Vidbir, the national final to select the Ukrainian entry for the Eurovision Song Contest 2027. The competition took place on February 2027.

==== Competing entries ====
Artists and composers had the opportunity to submit their entries via an online submission form which accepted entries between 15 September and 2 November 2026. Only artists that had not performed in events organized by/located in the territory of "the aggressor state" or illegally entered the territories of Crimea since 15 March 2014 and Belarus since 24 February 2022, respectively, will be allowed to apply for the competition, and songs performed in the "language of the aggressor state" were prohibited. Dmytro Shurov was the music producer of the event, who was in charge of reviewing the received submissions. A total of 217 songs were received by the end of the deadline.

18 entries will be longlisted.

== At Eurovision ==
The Eurovision Song Contest 2027 will take place at the Arena Burgas in Burgas, Bulgaria, and consist of two semi-finals held on the respective dates of 11 and 13 May and the final on 15 May 2026. All nations with the exception of the host country (Bulgaria) and the "Big Four" (France, Germany, Italy and the United Kingdom) will be required to qualify from one of two semi-finals in order to compete for the final; the top ten countries from each semi-final will progress to the final.
