= Festivali i Këngës 65 =

65th edition of a music competition

Dates and venue
- Semi-final 1: 17 December 2026
- Final: 20 December 2026
- Venue: Palace of Congresses; Tirana, Albania

Organisation
- Host broadcaster: Radio Televizioni Shqiptar (RTSH)
- Artistic director: Alfred Kaçinari; Shpëtim Saraçi

Participants
- Number of entries: 29

Festivali i Këngës 65 is the upcoming 65th edition of the annual Albanian music competition Festivali i Këngës, organised by Radio Televizioni Shqiptar (RTSH). It will be held between 17 and 20 December 2026 at the Palace of Congresses in Tirana. The winner of the competition will represent Albania in the Eurovision Song Contest 2027, which will be held in Burgas, Bulgaria.

== Format ==
In September 2026, it was announced that Alfred Kaçinari and Shpëtim Saraçi – who had previously taken on the role together in 1999 and 2016 – would serve as the artistic director. The final will take place on 20 December 2026.

== Contestants ==
RTSH opened an application period for interested artists and composers on 22 September 2026, with applications open until 27 September. In June 2026, RTSH announced that the winner of Festivali i Pranverës (Arsi Bako), will receive a place in Festivali i Këngës 65. A total of 28 artists appeared on the list of selected competing acts, which was published on 9 October. Among the participants is Kejsi Tola, who won the 47th edition of the contest.

On 18 November 2026, Amela Qemalja was added to the list of participants in the event, suggesting the possible withdrawal of one of the previously selected artists. However, as of that date, broadcaster RTSH had not issued any official statement regarding the matter.

The titles of the first four songs and their authors were released on 21 November.

Festivali i Këngës 65 established artists
| Artist | Song | Songwriter(s) |
|---|---|---|
| Adhurim Demiri | | |
| Alegra Jaho | | |
| Algert Sala | "Ika" | Algert Sala |
| Amela Qemalja | "Të Dua" | Valter Beqo, Martin Pano |
| Ana Bushgjokaj | | |
| Ardit Çuni | "Çike" | Marsel Gunga, Ardit Çuni, Stiv Ushe |
| Arsi Bako | "Kurajo" | Arbër Salihu |
| Auron Deva and DJ Sardi | "Bashkë" | DJ Sardi, Anxhela Peristeri |
| Chip Deva | | |
| Djemtë e detit | | |
| Eldis Arrnjeti | "Atje" | Eldis Arrnjeti |
| Erinda Agolli | "Pa Ty" | Erinda Agolli, Ismail Kadare |
| Gigliola Haveriku | | |
| Gjergj Jorgaqi | "Dashurinë Lërma Këtu" | Gjergj Jorgaqi |
| Herva Novaku | | |
| Josif Gjipali and Ardita Meni | | |
| Kejsi Jazxhi | | |
| Kejsi Tola | | |
| Khuba-Shkelzen Rexhaj | | |
| Leandra Godaj | "Dritë" | Klodian Rexhepaj, Chiara Sala |
| Martina Serreqi | "Flasin" | Kejdi Musta, Algert Sala |
| Michela Paluca | | |
| Orgesa Zaimi | "Hile" | Ronela Hajati |
| Petro Fejza and Antonio Papa | | |
| Rei Bezhani | "Për Ty" | Rei Bezhani |
| Sara Bajraktari | | |
| Sigi Bastri | | |
| Vanesa Sono | | |
| Xhoni Jesku | | |
