= Iolanda (singer) =

Portuguese singer-songwriter (born 1994)

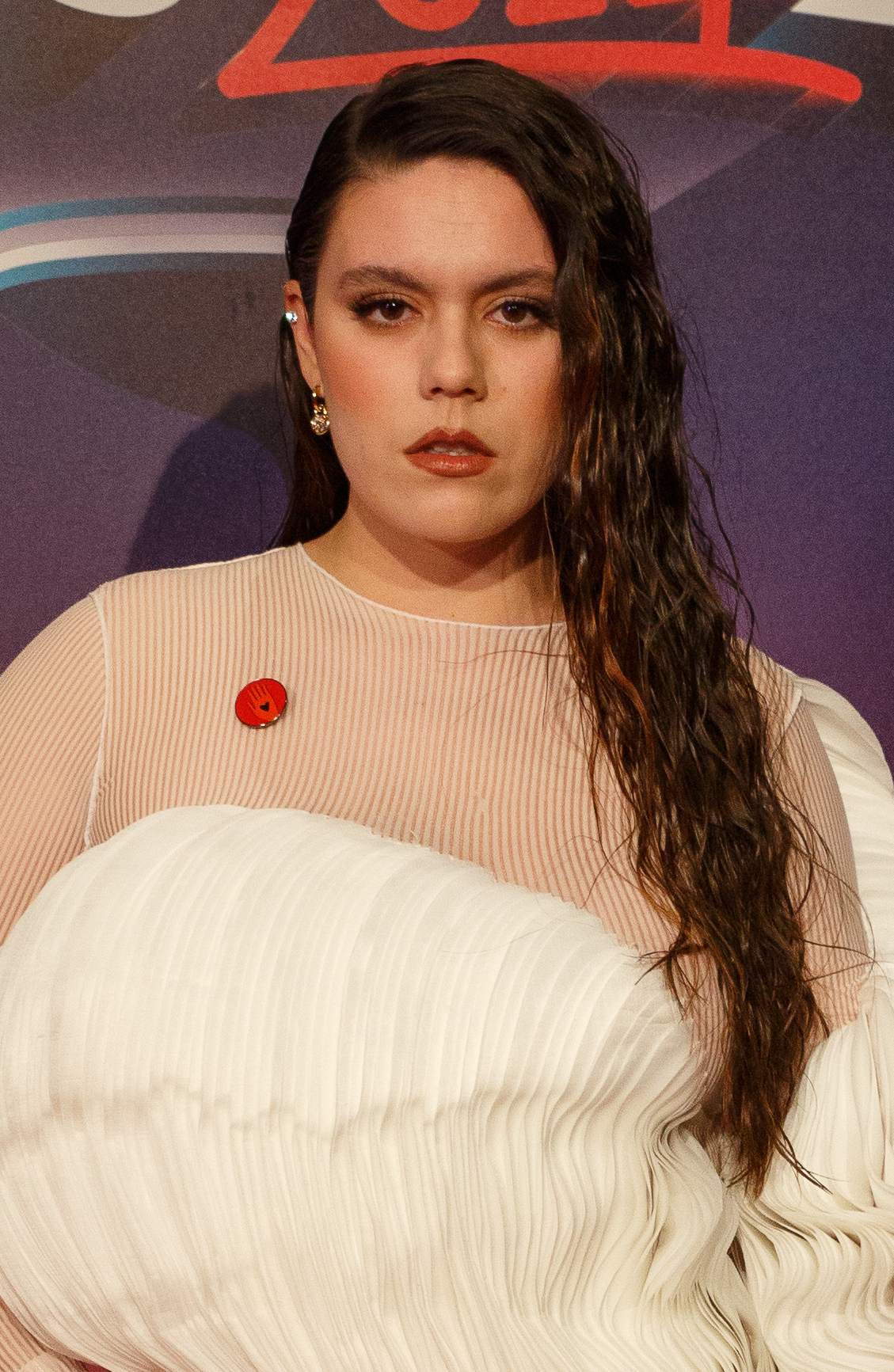
- Iolanda in 2024

Background information
- Born: Iolanda Portulez; 4 November 1994 (age 31); Figueira da Foz, Portugal
- Genres: Fado; pop
- Occupations: Singer; songwriter; producer
- Instrument: Vocals
- Years active: 2008–present
- Label: Altafonte Portugal

Iolanda Costa (European Portuguese pronunciation: [juˈlɐ̃dɐ ˈkɔʃtɐ]; born 4 November 1994), known mononymously as Iolanda, is a Portuguese singer and songwriter. She became known for her participation in the first season of the program Uma canção para ti, broadcast by TVI in December 2008. Iolanda represented Portugal in the Eurovision Song Contest 2024 with the song "Grito".

== Early life ==
Iolanda was born in 1994 in Figueira da Foz, but she moved to Pombal as a child. From an early age she revealed a great passion for music, and her vocation did not go unnoticed by her parents, who sent her to study music at Tecnimúsica, a school in Pombal, and later at the Conservatory, in Coimbra. At 17 she moved to Lisbon where she graduated in Communication Sciences from ISCSP whilst studying Jazz Vocals at Escola de Jazz Luís Villas Boas, more commonly known as Hot Club de Portugal. She tried performing in bars and national talent competitions as a gateway, then moved to London, where she studied songwriting at BIMM University in London, United Kingdom.

== Musical career ==
At the age of 14, Iolanda participated in the first edition of the talent show Uma canção para ti ("A song for you"), broadcast by TVI in December 2008 and was eliminated in the 2nd gala, thus failing to reach the final. In 2012, at the age of 17, she tried her luck again on a television program, this time in the 5th season of Ídolos, on SIC, but did not reach the live gala stage.

In 2014, Iolanda took to the stage of the Blind Tests of the second season of The Voice Portugal, on RTP1, but her performance of "Who You Are", by Jessie J, failed to impress any of the four mentors. In 2022, she made her debut at Festival da Canção, the Portuguese selection for the Eurovision Song Contest, as co-author and co-composer of the song "Mar no fim", performed by Blacci. In 2023, Iolanda released her first EP, entitled Cura, which she wrote during the COVID-19 pandemic.

In 2024, Iolanda was selected to compete in the Festival da Canção 2024 with the song "Grito"; on 24 February 2024, she secured her place by in the final, ultimately winning the festival and going on to represent Portugal at the Eurovision Song Contest 2024. On 29 March 2024, several entrants, including Iolanda, released a joint statement calling for "an immediate and lasting ceasefire" in Gaza, as well as "the safe return of all hostages".

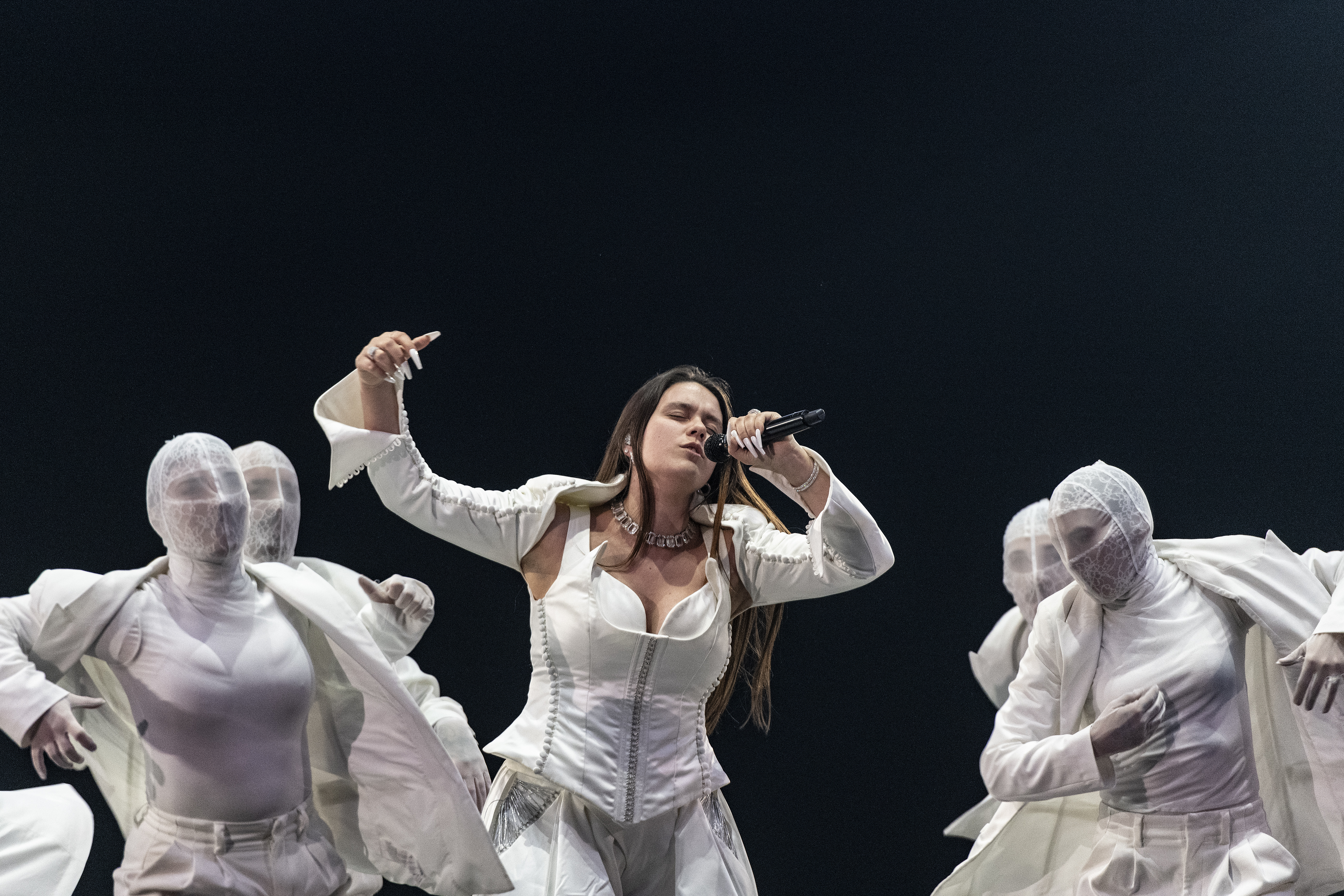
Iolanda at the Eurovision Song Contest 2024

Iolanda was drawn to compete in the first semi-final, where she placed eighth out of 16 with 58 points, qualifying to the grand final, where she placed 10th out of 26 with 152 points (139 from the juries and 13 from the televote).

On 11 February 2026, Iolanda participated in the "Amor ao Centro" benefit concert, alongside with several other Portuguese artists, to support the victims of Storm Kristin.

== Discography ==
=== Studio albums ===
List of studio albums, with selected details
Title	Details	Peak chart positions
Title	Details	POR
Quebranto	Released: 8 October 2026; Label: Altafonte; Formats: Digital download, streaming	174

=== Extended plays ===
List of EPs, with selected details
Title	Details
Cura	Released: 31 March 2023; Label: Altafonte; Formats: Digital download, streaming
Grito	Released: 14 June 2024; Label: Altafonte; Formats: Digital download, streaming
Olhar p'ra baixo	Released: 5 July 2024; Label: Altafonte; Formats: Digital download, streaming

=== Singles ===
==== As lead artist ====
Title	Year	Peak chart positions		Album or EP
Title	Year	POR	LTU	Album or EP
"Cura"	2022	—	—	Cura
"Assim" (with Choro and Matheus Paraizo featuring Inês Marques Lucas)	2022	—	—	Avalanche – Volume I
"Contigo" (with Soluna featuring Luar)	2022	—	—	Avalanche – Volume I
"Lugar certo"	2022	—	—	Cura
"Juro já nem paro"	2023	—	—	Cura
"Grito"	2024	42	65	Festival da Canção 2024
"Calma"	2024	—	—	Olhar p'ra baixo
"Laurinda" (with Karetus and Vitorino)	2024	129	—	Modas
"Contratempo" (with Marisa Liz)	2024	—	—	Non-album singles
"Quando te fores embora"	2025	—	—	Non-album singles
"Vaidade"	2025	—	—	Florbela
"Olha p'ra ela"	2026	—	—	Quebranto
"Responso"	2026	—	—	Quebranto
"Noite inteira"	2026	—	—	Quebranto
"—" denotes a recording that did not chart or was not released in that territory.

==== As featured artist ====
Title	Year	Peak chart positions	Album or EP
Title	Year	POR	Album or EP
"Crying Out" (Darko featuring Iolanda)	2015	—	Overexpression
"Tento na língua" (Carolina Deslandes featuring Iolanda)	2025	108	Chorar No Club
"—" denotes a recording that did not chart or was not released in that territory.

=== Other collaborations ===
Title	Year	Album or EP
"Ensina-me a Voar" (Bárbara Tinoco featuring Iolanda)	2024	Bichinho (para onde vai o amor?)
"Desalento" (Dør featuring Iolanda and Rita Onofre)	2024	Fases
"Mudar a canção" (Marisa Liz with Alex D'Alva, Bárbara Tinoco, Carlão, Cláudia Pascoal, Diogo Piçarra, Iolanda, Luís Trigacheiro, Neyna, Paulo de Carvalho, Sara Correia, and Simone de Oliveira)	2024	Non-album single
"Tempestade" (Xtinto featuring Iolanda)	2026	Em sonhos, é sabido, não se morre

== Awards and nominations ==
Year	Award	Category	Nominee(s)	Result	Ref.
2024	Eurovision Awards	Vocal Powerhouse Award	Herself	Runner-up	
2025	PLAY - Portuguese Music Awards	Best New Artist	Herself	Nominated	
2025	NiT Awards	Best Original Song	"Grito"	Nominated	

Awards and achievements
Preceded by Mimicat with "Ai coração"	Portugal in the Eurovision Song Contest; 2024	Succeeded by Napa with "Deslocado"
