= Lithuania in the Eurovision Song Contest 2027 =

- Eurovision Song Contest 2027
- Participating broadcaster: Lithuanian National Radio and Television (LRT)
- Country: Lithuania
- Selection process: Eurovizija.LT 2027
- Selection date: 20 February 2027

Participation chronology

Lithuania is set to be represented at the Eurovision Song Contest 2027, which will be held in Burgas, Bulgaria. The Lithuanian participating broadcaster, Lietuvos radijas ir televizija (LRT), will organize the national final Eurovizija.LT to select its entry for the contest.

== Background ==
Prior to 2027, Lietuvos radijas ir televizija (LRT) had participated in the Eurovision Song Contest representing Lithuania twenty-six times since its debut in 1994. Its best placing was achieved in 2006, with the song "We Are the Winners" performed by LT United, which finished in sixth place in the final. Since the introduction of semi-finals in 2004, LRT has managed to qualify for the final fifteen times. It was represented in 2026 by the song "Sólo quiero más", performed by Lion Ceccah, who qualified for the final and finished 22th overall with 22 points.

As part of its duties as participating broadcaster, LRT organises the selection of its entry in the Eurovision Song Contest and broadcasts the event in the country. LRT has used a national final to select all of its Eurovision entries, with the exception of its debut entry in 1994. Between 2020 and 2023, the national final format Pabandom iš naujo! was used to select its entry. In 2024 LRT introduced a new format, titled Eurovizija.LT. In August 2026, LRT confirmed its intention to participate in the 2027 contest; a month later, the broadcaster started accepting applications for Eurovizija.LT 2027.

== Before Eurovision ==
=== Eurovizija.LT 2027 ===
Eurovizija.LT 2027 is set to be the national final format organized by LRT to select its entry for the Eurovision Song Contest 2027. It will be aired between 23 January and 20 February 2027, with all shows held at LRT's studios in Vilnius.

==== Format ====
The competition will consist of four semi-finals, held between 20 January and 13 February 2027, and a final on 20 February 2027. A 50/50 combination of jury and public vote will determine the ranking in each phase, with the top two entries from each semi-final qualifying for the final; the third-place entry advances to a wildcard round, where only the audience will determine two additional finalists. In case of a tie in any of the previous stages, the public ranking will take precedence. The scoring system will be the same as used at the Eurovision Song Contest: the top ten entries from both the jury vote and the televote will be assigned scores of 1–8, 10, and 12 points.

Performances for the semi-finals will be pre-recorded, while those in the final will be performed live.

==== Competing entries ====
On 19 September 2026, LRT opened a submission platform for interested artists, which would remain open until 11 November 2026; the day before it was set to close, the deadline for song submissions was extended until 18 November. Each applicant may only submit one entry. Performers are required to be citizens of the European Union who have a permanent residence permit in Lithuania, while songwriters could be of any nationality, though citizens of states hostile to Lithuania are not allowed to submit entries. Several dozen participants will be selected by 25 November 2026, with all participants and their song titles announced at a later date. The selected artists will be able to withdraw until 10 December 2026 and will have to submit the final version of the song to the organizers by 23 December 2026.

==== Semi-finals ====
The four semi-finals of the competition will be filmed on 18, 19, 25 and 26 January 2027, and will be aired on 23, 30 January, 6 and 13 February 2027. In each semi-final, the top two entries will progress to the final, while the third-place finisher will advance to a wildcard round.

===== Wildcard round =====
After the last semi-final, an online wildcard round will be organized, in which all the contestants who finished third in the semi-finals will participate. The two contestants with the most votes will become additional finalists. Each voter will have one vote.

==== Final ====
The live final of the competition will take place on 20 February 2027.
