= Eurovision Song Contest 2027 =

International song competition

- United by Music

Dates and venue
- Semi-final 1: 11 May 2027
- Semi-final 2: 13 May 2027
- Final: 15 May 2027
- Venue: Arena Burgas; Burgas, Bulgaria

Organisation
- Organiser: European Broadcasting Union (EBU)
- ESC director: Martin Green
- ESC executive producer: Gert Kark

Production
- Host broadcaster: Bulgarian National Television (BNT)
- Executive producer: Simeon Kasabov; Atanas Genov

Participants
- Number of entries: 36 (Note: Hungary, Iceland, Slovenia, and Spain are yet to decide whether or not they will participate in 2027.)
- Number of finalists: 25 (Note: If Spain decides to participate, it would automatically qualify for the final, bringing the number up to 26.)
- Debuting countries: Canada
- Returning countries: North Macedonia
- Non-returning countries: Czechia
- Participation map: Countries pre-qualified for the final Countries set to compete in the semi-finals Countries that participated in the past but not in 2027

The Eurovision Song Contest 2027 will be the 71st edition of the Eurovision Song Contest. It is set to consist of two semi-finals on 11 and 13 May and a final on 15 May 2027, held at Arena Burgas in Burgas, Bulgaria. It is being organised by the European Broadcasting Union (EBU) and host broadcaster Bulgarian National Television (BNT), which will stage the event after winning the 2026 contest for Bulgaria with the song "Bangaranga" by Dara.

Broadcasters from thirty-six countries are set to participate in the contest, one more than in 2026. North Macedonia is set to return after a four-year absence and Canada is set to make its debut, while Czechia opted not to participate due to financial reasons.

== Location ==
The 2027 contest will take place in Burgas, Bulgaria, following the country's victory at the 2026 contest with "Bangaranga", performed by Dara. It will be the first edition of the contest hosted in Bulgaria and the second Eurovision event held in the country, after the Junior Eurovision Song Contest 2015 in Sofia. The selected venue for the contest is Arena Burgas, which serves as a venue for indoor sports and concert events.

In addition to the main venue, the Port of Burgas is set to be the location of the Eurovision Village, which hosts performances by contest participants and local artists, as well as screenings of the live shows.

=== Bidding phase ===
The location of the host city Burgas (in blue), shortlisted cities (in green) and other bidding cities (in red)

After Bulgaria's win in 2026, Milena Milotinova, director of Bulgarian National Television (BNT), said during the winner's press conference that the broadcaster was ready to host the 2027 contest in Sofia. Between 17 and 18 May 2026, the mayors of Burgas, Sofia, Plovdiv, and Varna all declared readiness for their respective city to host the event. By 21 May, the Bulgarian government had begun establishing an interdepartmental working group, headed by Deputy Prime Minister Ivo Hristov, to coordinate preparations for the contest. BNT opened the bidding process on 8 June, issuing requirements for the four interested cities, all of which delivered their bids by 3 July. On 13 July, BNT announced that the choice of host city had been narrowed to Burgas and Sofia. Throughout that month, the two candidate cities received an inspection visit from EBU representatives. On 13 August, the EBU and BNT announced Burgas as the host city.

Key:
† Host city * Shortlisted

City	Venue	Notes	Ref.
Burgas †	Arena Burgas	Bid supported by the Municipal Council of Burgas.	
Plovdiv	Kolodruma	Did not meet the EBU requirements of capacity.	
Sofia *	Arena Sofia	Hosted the Junior Eurovision Song Contest 2015.	
Varna	Palace of Culture and Sports	Did not meet the EBU requirements of capacity.	

== Participants ==
Eurovision Song Contest 2027 – Participation summaries by country
- Albania; Armenia; Australia; Austria; Azerbaijan; Belgium; Bulgaria; Canada; Croatia; Cyprus; Denmark; Estonia; Finland; France; Georgia; Germany; Greece; Israel; Italy; Latvia; Lithuania; Luxembourg; Malta; Moldova; Montenegro; North Macedonia; Norway; Poland; Portugal; Romania; San Marino; Serbia; Sweden; Switzerland; Ukraine; United Kingdom

Eligibility for participation in the Eurovision Song Contest requires a national public broadcaster with an EBU membership capable of receiving the contest via the Eurovision network and broadcasting it live nationwide. The EBU issues an invitation to participate in the contest to all members.

On 28 October 2026, the EBU provisionally announced that broadcasters from 36 countries would participate in the 2027 contest. North Macedonia is set to return after a four-year absence. Additionally, Canada is set to make its debut after its broadcaster was accepted as an EBU member in June 2026, being the first debuting country since Australia was invited to join the contest in 2015. Meanwhile, Czechia decided not to participate due to budget cuts at its broadcaster.

Eurovision Song Contest 2027 participants
Country	Broadcaster	Artist	Song	Language	Songwriter(s)	Ref.
Albania	RTSH	TBD 20 December 2026				
Armenia	AMPTV					
Australia	SBS					
Austria	ORF					
Azerbaijan	İTV					
Belgium	VRT					
Bulgaria	BNT					
Canada	CBC/Radio-Canada	TBA 5 December 2026		English, French		
Croatia	HRT	TBD February 2027				
Cyprus	CyBC	George Perris				
Denmark	DR	TBD 13 February 2027				
Estonia	ERR	TBD 30 January 2027				
Finland	Yle	TBD 20 February 2027				
France	France Télévisions					
Georgia	GPB					
Germany	SWR	TBD February 2027				
Greece	ERT	TBD 13 February 2027				
Israel	IPBC	TBD January 2027				
Italy	RAI	TBD 19 February 2027				
Latvia	LSM	TBD 6 February 2027				
Lithuania	LRT	TBD 20 February 2027				
Luxembourg	RTL	TBD 30 January 2027				
Malta	PBS					
Moldova	TRM	TBD 30 January 2027				
Montenegro	RTCG					
North Macedonia	MRT					
Norway	NRK					
Poland	TVP	TBD January or February 2027				
Portugal	RTP	TBD 6 March 2027				
Romania	TVR					
San Marino	SMRTV	TBD 6 March 2027				
Serbia	RTS					
Sweden	SVT	TBD 13 March 2027				
Switzerland	SRG SSR					
Ukraine	Suspilne	TBD February 2027				
United Kingdom	BBC					

=== Other countries ===
EBU member broadcasters in Andorra, Bosnia and Herzegovina, and Czechia confirmed non-participation prior to the announcement of the participants list by the EBU. Duna Média, a member broadcaster from Hungary, stated in September 2026 that its acting CEO, András Horváth, had negotiated a reduction in participation fees and an extension of the application deadline to 7 December. On 20 November, Hungary's new public broadcaster, MRTV, which replaced Duna Média and MTVA, confirmed that no decision had yet been made.

==== Boycotts due to Israeli participation ====
Broadcasters from Iceland, Ireland, the Netherlands, Slovenia, and Spain opted not to take part in the 2026 contest to protest Israel's participation in the context of the Gaza war. In an interview with Variety published on 1 July 2026, contest director Martin Green stated that a vote on Israel's participation in 2027 would not be held. The Israeli broadcaster Kan confirmed its intention to participate in Bulgaria on 12 July.

Two of the five boycotting broadcasters from 2026, Ireland's RTÉ and the Netherlands' AVROTROS, announced between August and September 2026 that they would continue to do so in 2027. Although NPO, the umbrella organisation of the Dutch public broadcasting system, initially announced on 23 September that it would take part on behalf of the Netherlands, it reversed this decision on 27 October, citing a lack of support among its member broadcasters following protests from employees and demands for clarification.

The three remaining boycotting broadcasters have yet to make a decision. The board of Iceland's RÚV voted on 30 September to maintain its boycott, and the list of participants did not include Iceland; however, RÚV stated that it had not decided yet. As for Slovenia, RTVSLO's draft production plan for 2027, published in November, does not allocate sufficient budget for participation. On 22 September, José Pablo López, chairman of Spain's RTVE, stated before the Cortes Generales committee overseeing RTVE that he would propose to the broadcaster's board of directors to maintain its absence from the contest. On 15 October, The Objective reported that López had postponed the decision, which is expected to be discussed by RTVE's board in November. However, this decision was subsequently postponed once again. The EBU has delayed the confirmation deadline for RÚV, RTVE, and RTVSLO to December, giving them additional time to decide.

== Production and format ==
The Eurovision Song Contest 2027 will be produced by the Bulgarian National Television (BNT), with director general Milena Milotinova overseeing preparations for the contest. The core team will consist of Simeon Kasabov as chief executive producer, Atanas Genov as executive producer, Ilias Kokotos as supervisor for the show, Marvin Dietmann as head of show and contest, Kremena Kadieva as head of legal, Rositsa Grigorova as head of finance, Joana Levieva-Sawyer as head of event, Desislava Olovanova as head of marketing, brand, commercial and digital, Desislava Paunska as head of communications and domestic public relations, and Boryana Gramatikova as core team coordinator and assistant executive producer. Dietmann is repeating his functions from the previous edition.

In July 2026, the Bulgarian government adopted an action plan for the contest's production. Under the plan, an executive producer and creative director were to be appointed by 30 August; an agreement with the selected venue was to be signed by 10 September, with its spaces allocated for contest use by 30 September; a projected budget was to be prepared by 10 October; and the creative concept and visual design are to be completed by 15 December. Presenters and scriptwriters are to be selected between November 2026 and April 2027, while stage construction and technical rehearsals are scheduled to take place from mid-March until the end of April. The Eurovision Village is planned to operate from 13 April to 31 May, and the venue is to be restored to normal use between 18 and 24 May.

The Bulgarian government has allocated around €20 million as part of the budget needed to host the event, with an additional €4.8 million set aside for the Burgas Municipality. The additional funds will be used for the test events and technical upgrades for Arena Burgas.

Carmelle, who won the inaugural edition of the Eurovision Song Contest Asia for the Philippines with the song "Sobra-Sobra", is set to perform as a guest.

=== Voting system and contest structure ===
On 12 August 2026, the EBU published a summary of the rules for the 2027 contest. Among the most notable changes, the minimum age for contestants was raised to 18 on the day of their first rehearsal (instead of 16 as had been the case since 1990) in order to protect 16 and 17-year-olds from excess pressure associated with taking part in the contest, and further measures were implemented to limit excessive use of pre-recorded backing vocals. Aftonbladet has reported, citing a letter by the EBU to its members, that additional proposed changes include moving public voting online entirely and requiring viewers to vote for more than one entry.

== Broadcasts ==
All participating broadcasters may choose to have on-site or remote commentators providing insight and voting information to their local audience. They are required to broadcast the final and semi-final in which their country votes. The Eurovision Song Contest YouTube channel provides international live streams with no commentary of all shows.

The following are the broadcasters that have confirmed in whole or in part their broadcasting plans and/or commentators:

Broadcasts and commentators in participating countries
Country	Broadcaster	Channel(s)	Show(s)	Commentator(s)	Ref.
United Kingdom	BBC	BBC One, BBC Radio 2	All shows	TBA	

Planned broadcasts and commentators in non-participating countries
Country	Broadcaster	Channel(s)	Show(s)	Commentator(s)	Ref.
Netherlands	NOS	NPO 1	All shows	TBA	

== See also ==
- Junior Eurovision Song Contest 2027
- Eurovision Young Musicians 2027
