= Santa Catarina Park =

Park in Funchal, Madeira, Portugal

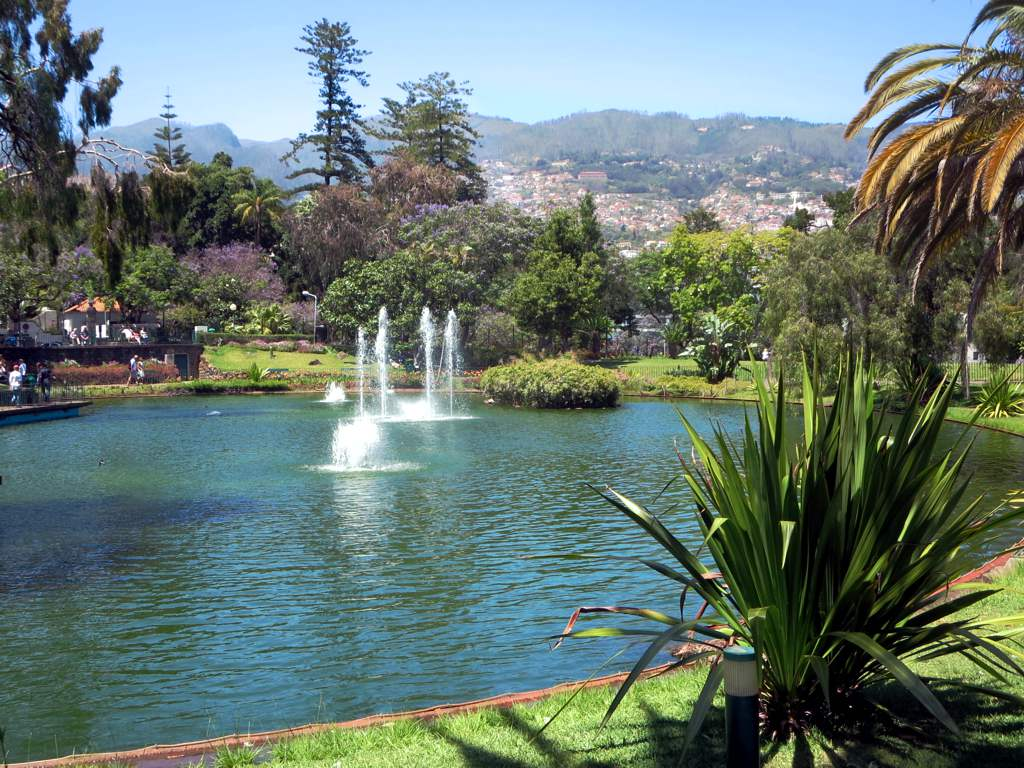
- Fountain in Santa Catarina Park
- Interactive map of Santa Catarina Park
- Type: Public park
- Location: Funchal in Madeira
- Coordinates: 32°38′43.8″N 16°54′50.6″W
- Area: 36,000 m^{2} (390,000 sq ft)
- Created: 1966
- Status: Open year round

Santa Catarina Park (Portuguese: Parque de Santa Catarina) is one of the largest parks in Funchal, Madeira, Portugal.

== History ==
The site of the park was originally occupied by a chapel. The chapel, called Santa Catarina Chapel, was built out of wood in the early 1400s, and then upgraded to stone in the 1600s.

== Description ==
This park is about 36,000 square metres (390,000 ft^{2}) in area. It has multiple aviaries, and is located near the Bay of Funchal. There are several paths with benches, in addition to some statues and Santa Catarina Chapel.

== Gallery ==
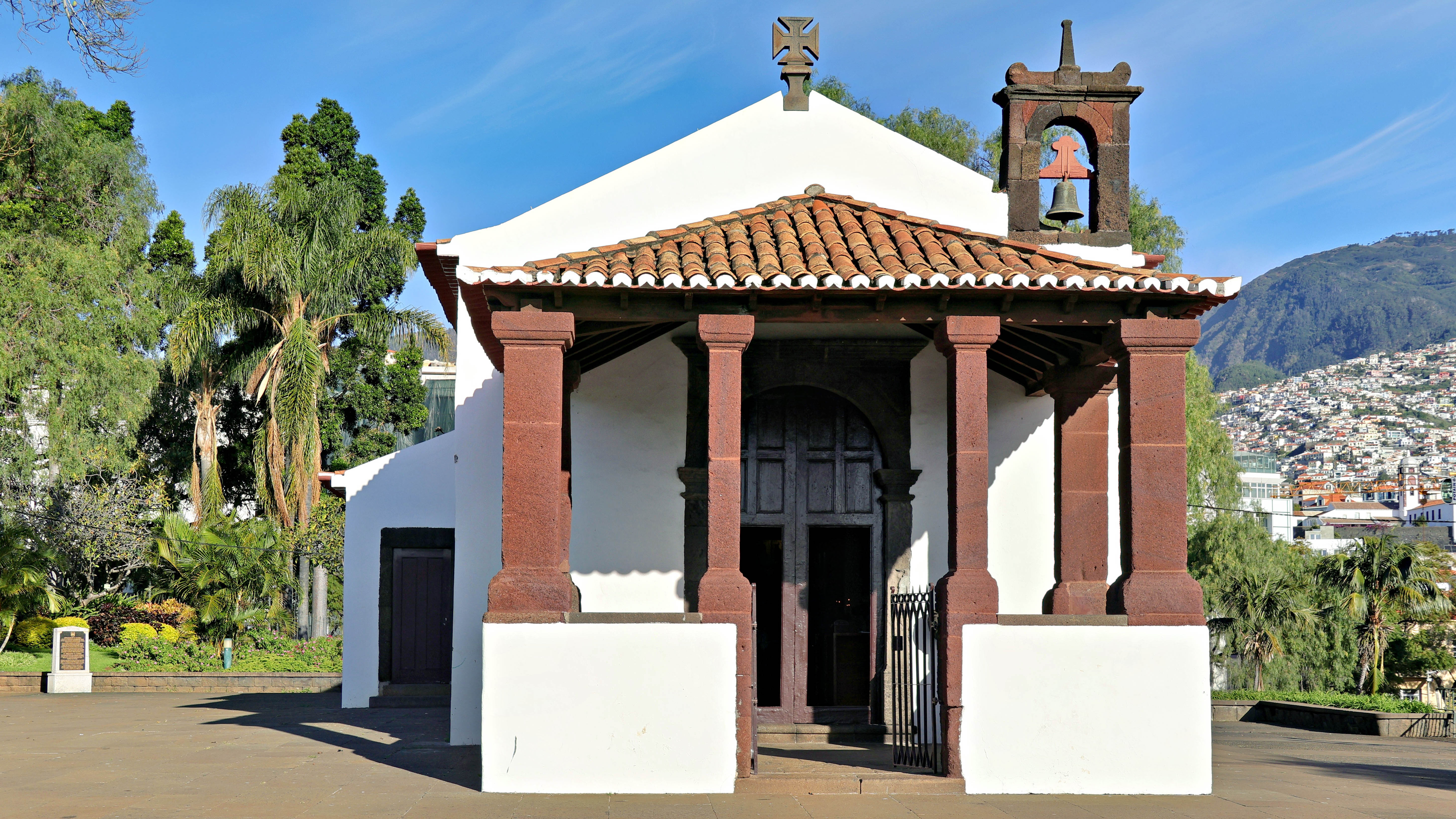
Santa Catarina Chapel

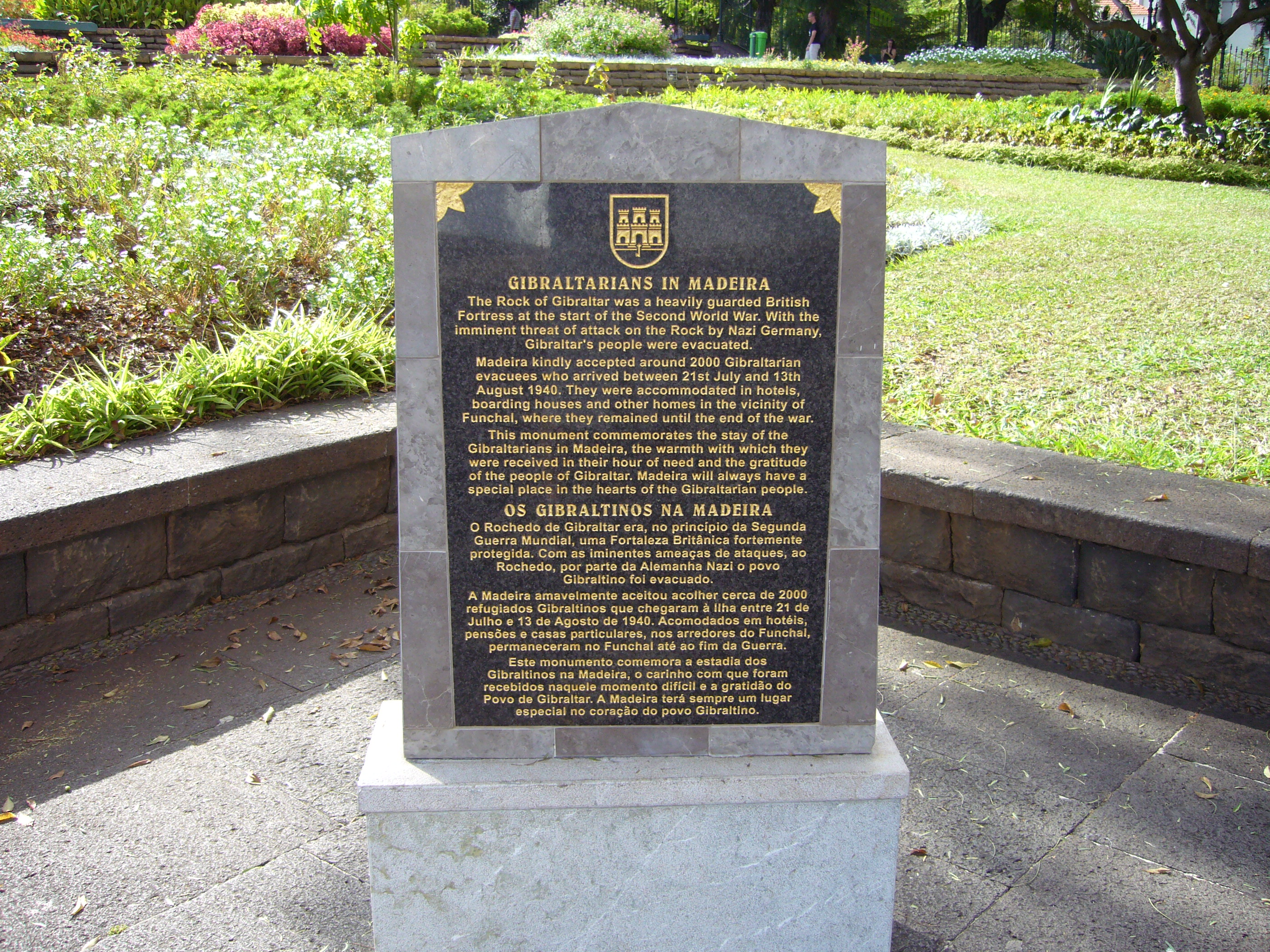
Monument from Gibraltar

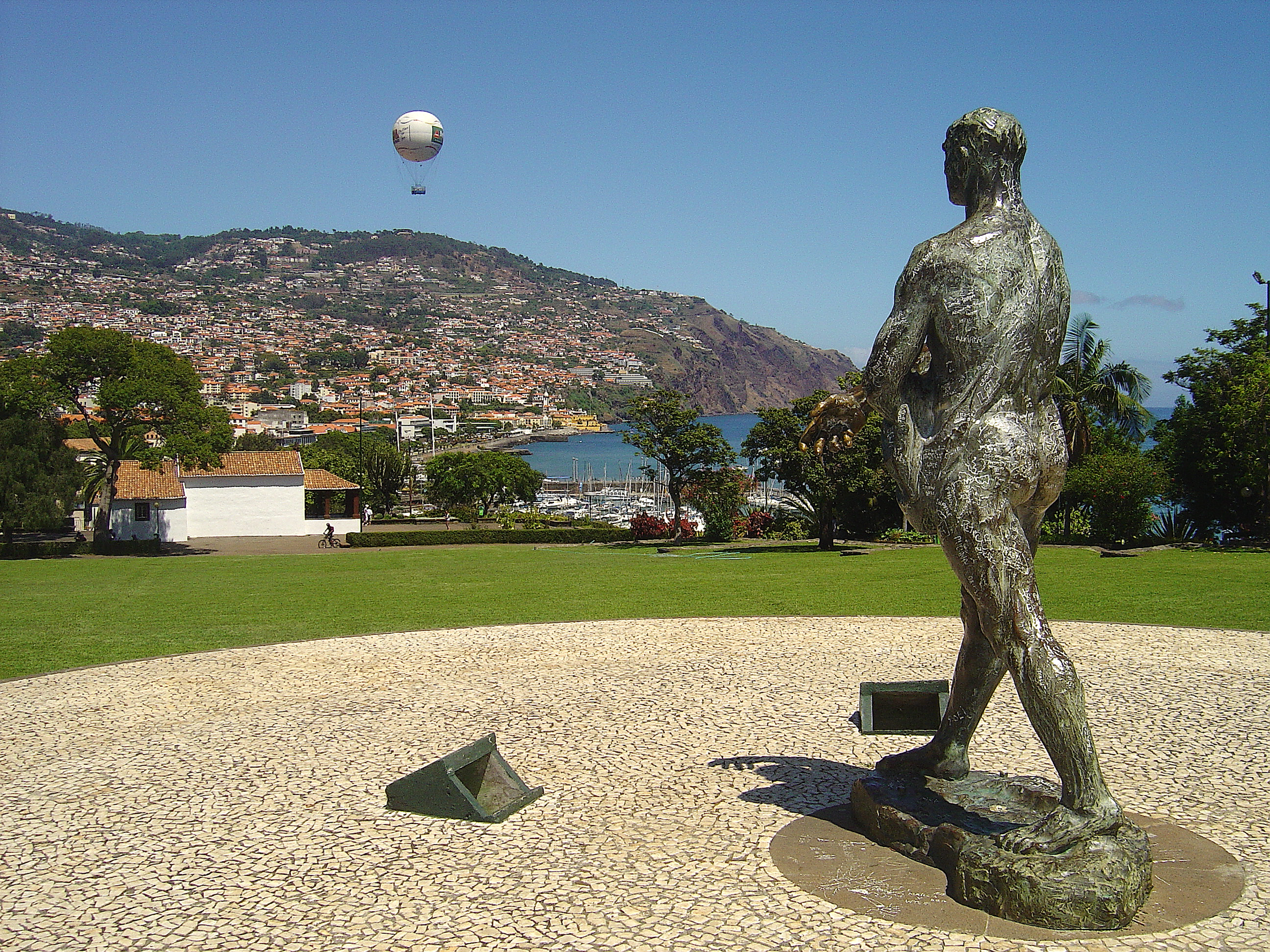
Statue of a farmer

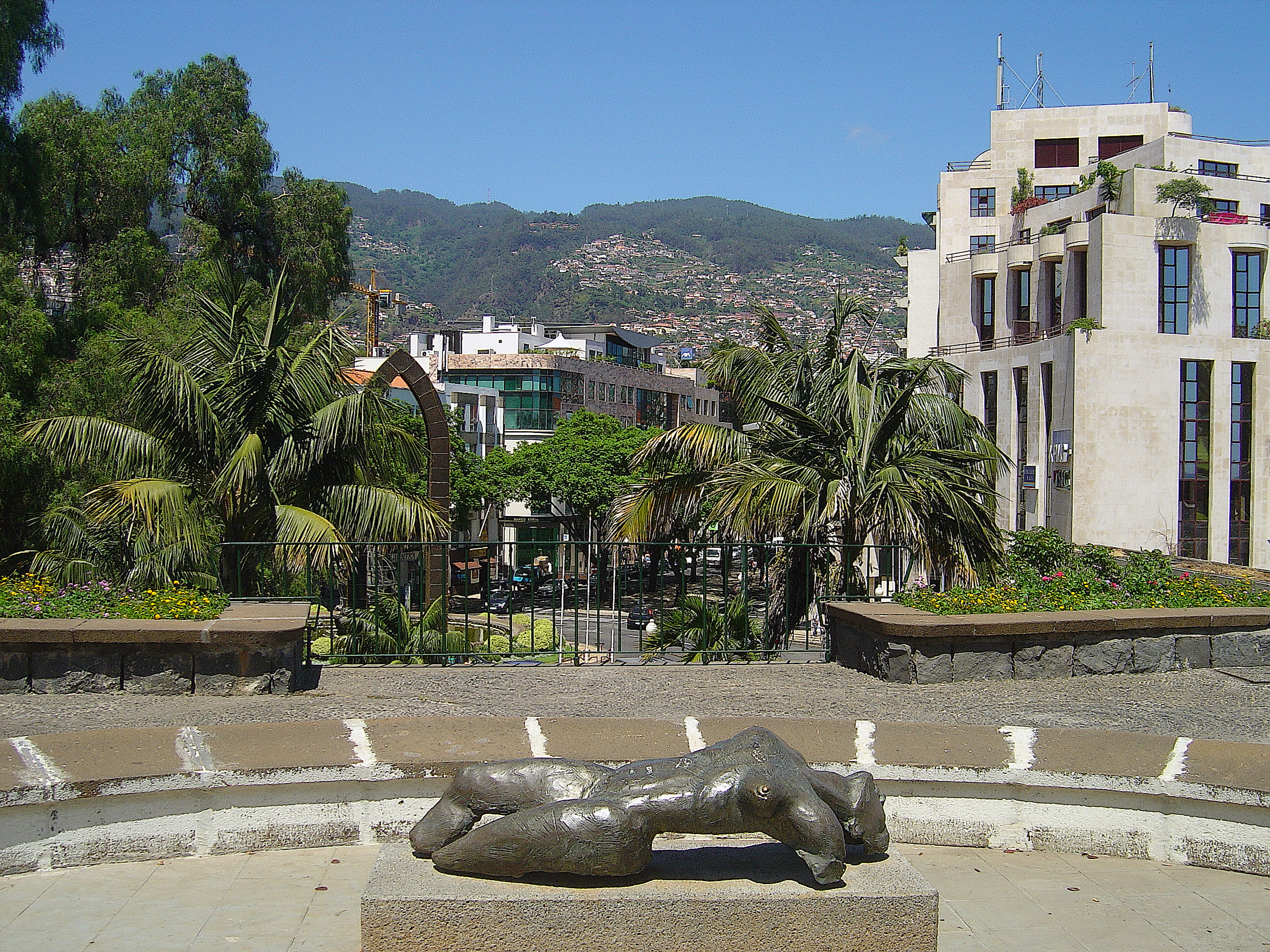
Statue of a female torso

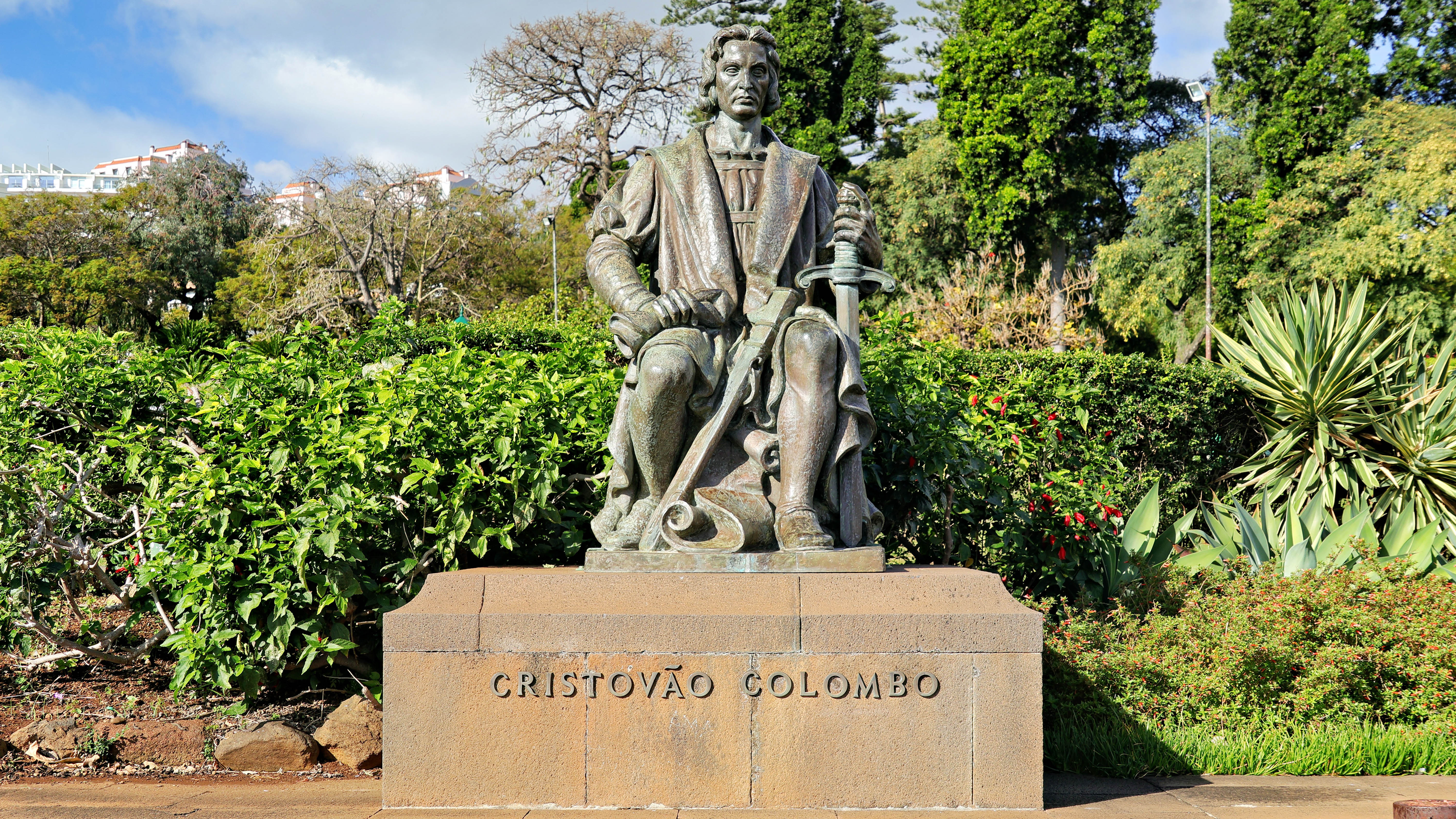
Statue of Christopher Columbus
