= Grito (song) =

2024 song by Iolanda

Single by Iolanda
- English title: "Shout"
- Released: 18 January 2024
- Length: 2:56
- Label: Universal
- Songwriters: Iolanda Costa; Alberto "Luar" Hernández
- Producers: Iolanda Costa; Alberto "Luar" Hernández

Iolanda singles chronology
"Juro já nem paro" (2023)	"Grito" (2024)	"Calma" (2024)

Music video
- "Grito" on YouTube

Eurovision Song Contest 2024 entry
- Country: Portugal
- Artist: Iolanda
- Language: Portuguese
- Composers: Iolanda Costa; Alberto "Luar" Hernández
- Lyricist: Iolanda Costa

Finals performance
- Semi-final result: 8th
- Semi-final points: 58
- Final result: 10th
- Final points: 152

Entry chronology
- ◄ "Ai coração" (2023)
- "Deslocado" (2025) ►

Official performance video
- "Grito" (First Semi-Final) on YouTube "Grito" (Grand Final) on YouTube

"Grito" (Portuguese pronunciation: [ˈɡɾitu]; transl. "Shout") is a song by Portuguese singer Iolanda, written by herself alongside Alberto "Luar" Hernández. It was released on 18 January 2024 as part of the album for the Festival da Canção 2024, which it later won, and thus represented Portugal in the Eurovision Song Contest 2024. It placed in 10th at the grand final with 152 points.

== Background and composition ==
"Grito" was written by Iolanda Costa alongside Alberto Hernández. According to Iolanda, she first wrote the song during a vacation where she was "exploring the sentimental side of my relationships with my family and friends". In an interview with That Eurovision Site, she explained that she wrote the song after being invited by RTP to participate in Festival da Canção 2024, and described it as 'a scream of self defense and trusting in yourself'. In an analysis by Wiwibloggs' Ruxandra Tudor, the song was described to be an account of Iolanda's mental health journey, with the lyrics "speak[ing] about letting things go and a willing of raising again, of seeking for the light when in a dark place".

The song was announced on 18 January, and was released as part of the festival's official album. The song qualified from the semi final and won the final, granting Iolanda the right to represent Portugal at the Eurovision Song Contest 2024. The official video was premiered on the Eurovision Song Contest YouTube channel on 10 March, which featured Iolanda's performance from Festival da Canção.

== Promotion ==
To promote the song in the months heading into the contest, Iolanda performed the song at various occasions, She first announced her intent to participate in Pre-Party ES on 30 March 2024, a Eurovision pre-party. She also announced her participation at a Eurovision Village event on 4 May. Iolanda also released an acoustic version of "Grito" on 10 April, which was recorded at the Church of Santa Engrácia.

== Critical reception ==
"Grito" has drawn mixed reception. In a Wiwibloggs review containing several reviews from several critics, the song was rated 6.3 out of 10 points, earning 24th out of 37 songs on the site's annual ranking. Another review conducted by ESC Bubble that contained reviews from a combination of readers and juries rated the song tenth out of the 15 songs "Grito" was competing against in its the Eurovision semi-final. ESC Beat's Doron Lahav ranked the song seventh overall, describing the song as a "very emotional ballad with a rich musical production". Jon O'Brien, a writer for Vulture, ranked the song 16th overall, stating that while "its melodies [is] perhaps a little too slow-burning and subtle", he admitted that "in a year when almost every country is vying to be the loudest, this is a much-needed palate cleanser". Scotsman writer Erin Adam rated the song five out of 10 points, finding the song "a bit boring".

== Eurovision Song Contest ==
=== Festival da Canção 2024 ===
Portugal's public broadcaster RTP organised a two-stage, 20-entry contest to select their entrant to the Eurovision Song Contest 2024. The contest consisted of two semi-finals with 10 entries each, of which 6 would qualify to the final from each. The semi-finals took place on 24 February and 2 March, while the final took place on 9 March. Five of the six qualifiers from each semi were determined by an equal jury vote and televote, while the sixth qualifier was determined by a second round of televoting. In the final, the score was determined by a 50/50 system of juries and public televoting.

Iolanda was announced as a composer on 18 November 2023, and as an entrant on 18 January. The song was drawn to participate in the first semi-final on 24 February, performing in ninth. It managed to qualify, placing first with 22 points. It performed in sixth at the final on 9 March, winning the final with 22 points again, scoring the maximum 12 points from the expert jury and secondary 10 points from the public televote.

=== At Eurovision ===
The Eurovision Song Contest 2024 took place at the Malmö Arena in Malmö, Sweden, and consisted of two semi-finals held on the respective dates of 7 and 9 May and the final on 11 May 2024. During the allocation draw on 30 January 2024, Portugal was drawn to compete in the first semi-final, performing in the second half of the show. Iolanda was later drawn to perform 14th, ahead of Australia's Electric Fields and before Luxembourg's Tali Golergant.

For its Eurovision performance, the staging remained mostly similar to the one given in Festival da Canção. Iolanda wore a white dress designed by Palestinian company Trashy Clothing, who stated that the dress was inspired by cartoonist Naji al-Ali and the design of the keffiyeh. She was also accompanied by five backing dancers who also wore white outfits. "Grito" finished eighth, scoring 58 points and securing a position in the grand final.

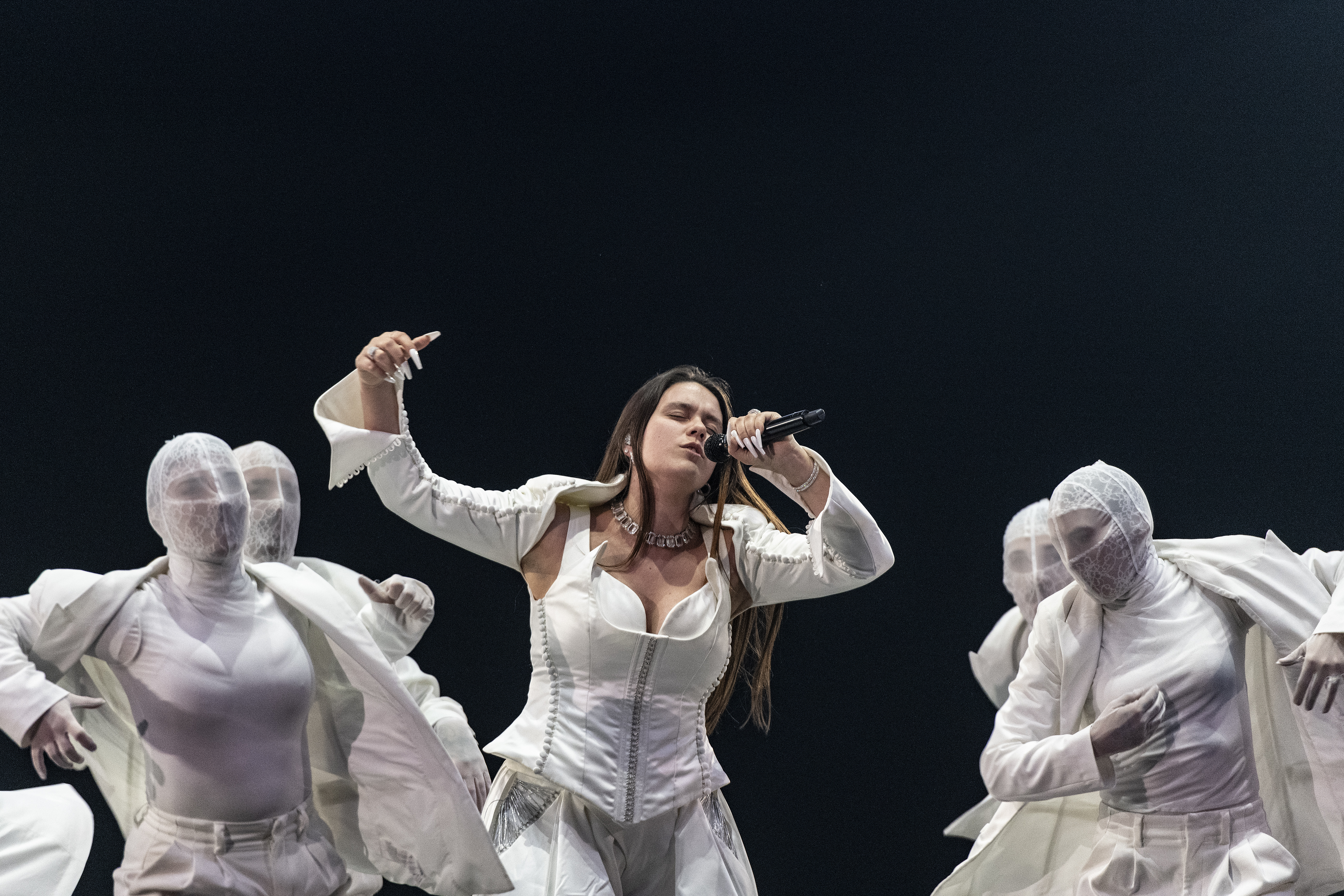
Iolanda performing "Grito" at a dress rehearsal before the Eurovision 2024 grand final.

Iolanda performed a repeat of her performance in the grand final on 11 May. The song was performed in 18th, ahead of Finland's Teemu Keisteri and before Armenia's Ladaniva. During the final, Iolanda wore nails designed in the style of a keffiyeh as a medium of support of Palestine in the Gaza war, later declaring at the end of her performance, "Peace will prevail". In response, the final performance was initially replaced by the semi-final performance on the Eurovision Song Contest's official YouTube channel. It was met with harsh criticism from RTP, who when told that the performance was replaced due to the nails, responded with, "What does that have to do with anything?" Although the final performance was eventually uploaded an hour after the contest, RTP proceeded to file a formal complaint in response to the delay. After the results were announced, she finished in 10th with 152 points, with a split score of 139 points from juries and 13 points from public televoting. Regarding the former, the song received three sets of the maximum 12 points from Croatia, France, and the United Kingdom. The song did not receive any sets of 12 points from the public televote; the most a country gave was six, with it being awarded by Luxembourg.

== Track listing ==
Digital download/streaming

1. "Grito" – 2:56

Digital download/streaming – EP

1. "Grito" – 2:56
2. "Grito - Live at Panteão Nacional" – 3:15
3. "Grito - Sped Up" – 2:34
4. "Grito - Acapella" – 3:00
5. "Grito - Instrumental" – 3:00
6. "Grito" – 2:56

Digital download/streaming – 2.0 version

1. "Grito 2.0" – 3:01

== Charts ==
Chart performance for "Grito"
Chart (2024)	Peak position
Lithuania (AGATA)	65
Portugal (AFP)	48

== Release history ==
Release history and formats for "Grito"
Country	Date	Format(s)	Version	Label	Ref.
Various	18 January 2024	Digital download; streaming	Original	Universal Music Portugal	
Various	14 June 2024	Digital download; streaming	Extended play	Altafonte Portugal	
Various	6 March 2025	Digital download; streaming	2.0 version	Altafonte Portugal	
