= Deslocado =

2025 song by Napa

Single by Napa

from the album Semitrópico
- Language: Portuguese
- English title: "Displaced"
- Released: 23 January 2025
- Genre: Indie rock
- Length: 2:59
- Label: Sony Music; Universal
- Songwriters: André Santos; Diogo Góis; Francisco Sousa; João Guilherme Gomes; João Lourenço Gomes; João Rodrigues
- Producers: André Santos; Luís "Twins" Pereira

Napa singles chronology
"Luz do túnel" (2023)	"Deslocado" (2025)	"Infinito" (2025)

Music video
- "Deslocado" on YouTube

Eurovision Song Contest 2025 entry
- Country: Portugal
- Artist: Napa
- Language: Portuguese
- Lyricist: João Guilherme Gomes

Finals performance
- Semi-final result: 9th
- Semi-final points: 56
- Final result: 21st
- Final points: 50

Entry chronology
- ◄ "Grito" (2024)
- "Rosa" (2026) ►

Official performance video
- "Deslocado" (First Semi-Final) on YouTube; "Deslocado" (Grand Final) on YouTube

"Deslocado" (European Portuguese: [dɨʒluˈkaðu], transl. "Displaced") is a song by Portuguese indie band Napa. An ode to the band's origins in Madeira while living displaced in mainland Portugal, the song was composed by André Santos, Diogo Góis, Francisco Sousa, João Guilherme Gomes, João Lourenço Gomes, and João Rodrigues, and was released on 23 January 2025 through Sony Music Portugal as part of the Festival da Canção 2025 compilation album. It was later released as a single on 10 March 2025 through Universal Music Portugal. The song represented Portugal in the Eurovision Song Contest 2025, qualifying ninth in the first semi-final with 56 points, and finishing 21st in the grand final with 50 points.

Critical response to "Deslocado" has been generally positive to mixed. Music critics have praised its melodic simplicity, use of the Portuguese language, and emotional tone, with particular emphasis on its lyrical themes of longing and displacement. Some reviewers found the song authentic, others said it lacked immediate impact.

"Deslocado" enjoyed commercial success, peaking at number one on the Portuguese singles charts, becoming Napa's first charting song in their home country. The song also charted in Lithuania, Luxembourg, Bolivia, Switzerland, and Greece, as well as the Dutch Single Tip, Peru Anglo airplay, and Swedish Heatseekers charts. It was also certified quadruple platinum by Associação Fonográfica Portuguesa and double platinum by Pro-Música Brasil.

== Background and composition ==
"Deslocado" was written by Napa's lead singer João Guilherme Gomes, composed by Napa and André Santos, and produced by the latter and Luís "Twins" Pereira. The song was described as a nod to the origins of the band, being composed of members from the island of Madeira living "displaced" in mainland Portugal, moving to Lisbon when they were 18 years old. "This is one of the most important songs we've ever done," the band highlighted. They further added, "we always wanted to portray that feeling of being displaced, of being an ocean away from home".

The lyrics of the song were partly inspired by a comedy show by Azorean Miguel Neves, in which he spoke of the feeling of coming from an island to the mainland, a place where you do not have "the sea as a horizon almost anywhere". The band also regarded João Borsch, who talked about the "island identity", and an interview with Lourdes Castro, who uttered that she only felt that it was good to have grown up in Madeira when she left, as inspirations for the song.

After the song's release, it quickly became popular on the video sharing platform TikTok, where several displaced and migrant young people made videos about their experiences. Following this trend, lead singer João Guilherme Gomes stated, "we quickly realised that there were thousands of displaced people within Portugal and Portuguese emigrants who identified with the message". Furthermore, João Rodrigues, the band's drummer, said that the song is dedicated to all Portuguese emigrants who "had to leave the country to have a better life, instead of just surviving in Portugal".

== Artwork ==
The song's cover art features one of the earliest known photographic records of Madeira, captured between 1863 and 1885. The image, which is currently housed in the Madeira Photography Museum – Atelier Vicente, depicts two boys from Porto da Cruz gazing at the horizon, a view that has been described as "a constant presence throughout their lives". In a social media post, the band said:

"At a time when life showed them few paths and isolation was very punishing, these boys would have to come to terms with the reality of living on the island their entire lives, without knowing the rest of the world. 150 years later, we are fortunate that life has given us a world to discover. And after we see the world, we can really understand where home is."

== Release and music video ==
"Deslocado" was released as part of the official compilation album of Festival da Canção 2025 on 23 January 2025. Following the band's victory, the song was released as a single on 10 March 2025. A music video was later released on 12 May 2025, and was directed by António Amaral and the directing duo Gattopardo, namely João Diogo Marques and Vasco Mendes. Interspersed throughout the music video are scenes set in an airport, where the band quietly observed travelers and farewells while playing their instruments. The music video also featured clips of displaced individuals, highlighting personal stories of those living far from their original homes. Said clips were submitted following an open call issued by the band on social media, inviting people from around the world to submit candid videos showing where they currently live. The band received about 600 video submissions.

== Promotion ==
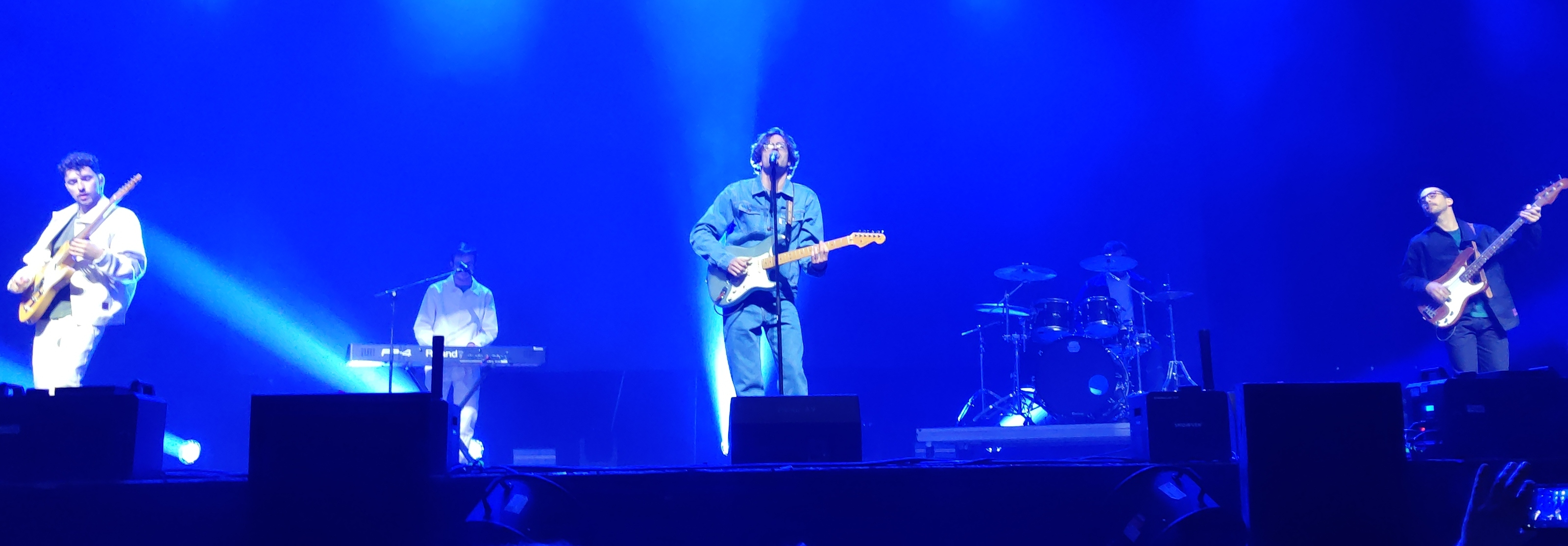
Napa performing at the Eurovision in Concert 2025 pre-party

To promote "Deslocado" before the Eurovision Song Contest 2025, Napa announced their intent to participate in various Eurovision pre-parties. It was first announced that they would be performing at Eurovision in Concert 2025 held at AFAS Live Arena in Amsterdam on 5 April 2025. The band also participated at PrePartyES 2025 on 19 April 2025 held at Sala La Riviera in Madrid.

== Critical reception ==
=== Eurovision betting odds ===
Prior to the actual contest, "Deslocado" was predicted not to qualify for the grand final, ranking last among the entries in the first semi-final by bookmakers. The song was given an estimated 14% chance of qualifying and an 84% chance of elimination in the semi-final. Following its qualification, the song was estimated to have less than one percent chance of winning, a two percent chance of finishing in the top five, and a seven percent chance of placing in the top 10. It was also estimated to have a 10% likelihood of finishing last.

=== Portuguese media and personalities ===
"Deslocado" was met with generally positive reviews from Portuguese music critics. Gonçalo Correia from Sábado described the song as an "elegant, classic, dreamy indie-pop song", further calling it a "declaration of love to Madeira". In an article for Diário de Notícias, Jorge Mangorrinha called the song "sober and emotional" and related it to Salvador Sobral's "Amar pelos dois", Portugal's Eurovision-winning entry in 2017. He praised the song's lyrical message, noting its growing popular and critical reception among audiences, and suggested that its understated authenticity contributed to Portugal's unexpected qualification for the final. In Jornal de Notícias, André Rosa praised the song's "melancholy melody" and its 1970s pop-rock instrumentation, which features a "subtle use" of flutes and traditional Madeiran string instruments like the viola de arame. He also highlighted the narrative of the lyrics, noting how it effectively captures the frustration of a young adult displaced from the "natural laurel forest" to the urban "concrete jungle" of the capital.

Writing for Público, Pedro Roque characterised "Deslocado" as a song that is simple yet a powerful reflection of issues such as internal migration, housing insecurity, and feelings of displacement in Portugal. He noted that the song expresses "a sentiment not only of those who are displaced, but of all of us who, in some way, feel displaced". He highlighted its simplicity and emotional depth, suggesting that the song captures sentiments many people share but have rarely articulated, aligning with the emotion of saudade, despite the word itself appearing only once in the song's entirety. In a review for Observador, Susana Verde commented that the song did not initially resonate with her but grew in appeal with repeated listens; however, she also noted it would not have been her personal choice as the winner. She later praised both the song and its lyrics, and calling their Eurovision performance "refreshing" and stood out as "the only act this year where [she] felt a band on stage".

=== Eurovision-related and international media ===
International critics offered a range of reviews on "Deslocado", varying from positive to mixed. Eva Frantz from the Finnish broadcaster Yle gave the song a seven out of 10, praising the track for its "sympathetic and pleasing" quality, and commended Napa’s commitment to singing in Portuguese. Likewise, Harmen van Dijk, Peter van der Lint, and Nienke Schipper from the Dutch newspaper Trouw highlighted Napa's use of the Portuguese language, describing it as "wonderfully melodic...that feeds the memory", and dubbed the song as "breathing the same fragility and peace". Writing for Esquire, Dave Holmes named the entry as one of the highlights of the contest. He described it as "a pure, simple, nice little pop song" and described it as a bittersweet reflection on Portuguese youth leaving the country in search of better job opportunities, and noted that its "lack of flash" could help it stand out.

Mark Savage from the BBC described the song as having a "70s vibe, channelling Paul McCartney's Wings", and calling it a "soft rock tear-jerker". Alberto Muraro from Cosmopolitan Italy characterised the song as having a "fresh and rhythmic vibe" that evokes "a sense of movement and lightheartedness", noting that it explores "feeling out of place while being at peace with one's own path". In Suara Merdeka, Fadlan Fahrial described the song as "a soft-tempo pop ballad with a minimalist arrangement" that places focus on the vocals and message, writing that its "simplicity is its strength", enabling listeners to connect with its "sincere emotions." He further interpreted the song as expressing both Madeiran identity and a universal feeling of being far from home, and noted that many listeners considered it “simple yet touching” for addressing the human experience of homesickness.

Jon O’Brien from Vulture ranked the song 17th out of the 37 entries, noting that the track followed Salvador Sobral's Eurovision formula of "authentic vibe", but doubted its broader appeal, citing that "audiences are unlikely to fall for the same trick twice". Still, he praised its "warm, stripped-back" sound and its "breezy harmonies and gentle acoustics", calling it a "much-needed antidote to all the bells and whistles elsewhere". Rob Picheta from CNN ranked the entry 23rd out of the 26 finalists, calling the song "perfectly nice" but "there's nothing in the staging that elevates it". Ralf Lofstad from Dagbladet gave the song a two out of six, describing it as a "flattering but bland semi-acoustic ballad" with a "Beatles-like quality". Aftenposten's Robert Hoftun Gjestad rated the song a three out of six, criticising it for being generic and describing it as a "100 per cent straightforward pop song that will quickly end up in the oblivion pile". In a review for The Times, Ed Potton gave the song one out of five stars, describing it as "totally forgettable".

== Eurovision Song Contest 2025 ==
=== Festival da Canção 2025 ===
Festival da Canção 2025 was the national final format organised by Rádio e Televisão de Portugal (RTP) to select the Portuguese representative for the Eurovision Song Contest 2025. The competition saw 20 entries competing across two semi-finals, held between 22 February and 1 March 2025, and a final on 8 March 2025. Each semi-final featured 10 competing entries from which six advanced from each show to complete the 12-song lineup in the final. Results during the semi-finals were determined by votes from a jury panel and public televoting; the first five qualifiers were based on the 50/50 combination of jury and public voting, while the sixth qualifier was determined by a second round of public televoting from the remaining entries. Results during the final were determined by the 50/50 combination of votes from seven regional juries and public televoting. Both the public televote and the juries assigned points from 1–8, 10, and 12 based on the ranking developed by both streams of voting.

Napa was officially announced to compete in Festival da Canção 2025 on 23 January 2025. "Deslocado" was drawn to perform eighth in the second semi-final, and was later announced as one of the six qualifiers, winning the semi-final with 20 points. The song performed seventh at the final on 8 March 2025, winning the final with 17 points, scoring the 7 points from the expert jury and 10 points from the public televote.

=== At Eurovision ===
The Eurovision Song Contest 2025 took place at St. Jakobshalle in Basel, Switzerland, and consisted of two semi-finals held on the respective dates of 13 and 15 May and the final on 17 May 2025. During the allocation draw held on 28 January 2025, Portugal was drawn to compete in the first semi-final, performing in the first half of the show. Napa was later drawn to perform seventh, after Sweden's KAJ and before Norway's Kyle Alessandro.

For its Eurovision performance, the band collaborated with designer Constança Entrudo, also from Madeira, to create bespoke outfits that visually express the group's insular identity and the central themes of the song. Entrudo drew inspiration from Madeira's cultural and natural heritage, integrating elements such as Bordado Madeira and references to the work of Lourdes Castro. The costumes featured handcrafted details, including floral motifs painted in Entrudo's Lisbon studio and embroidered in Madeira by local artisans in partnership with the embroidery company Bordal. These floral designs appeared in contrasting "positive" and "negative" forms across each outfit of the band members, emphasizing the song's themes of displacement and duality. There were asymmetrical cuts, translucent fabrics, and layered elements on the outfits, which described by Entrudo as exploring displaced silhouettes "as if they had been removed from their original context, in a constant interplay of presence and absence".

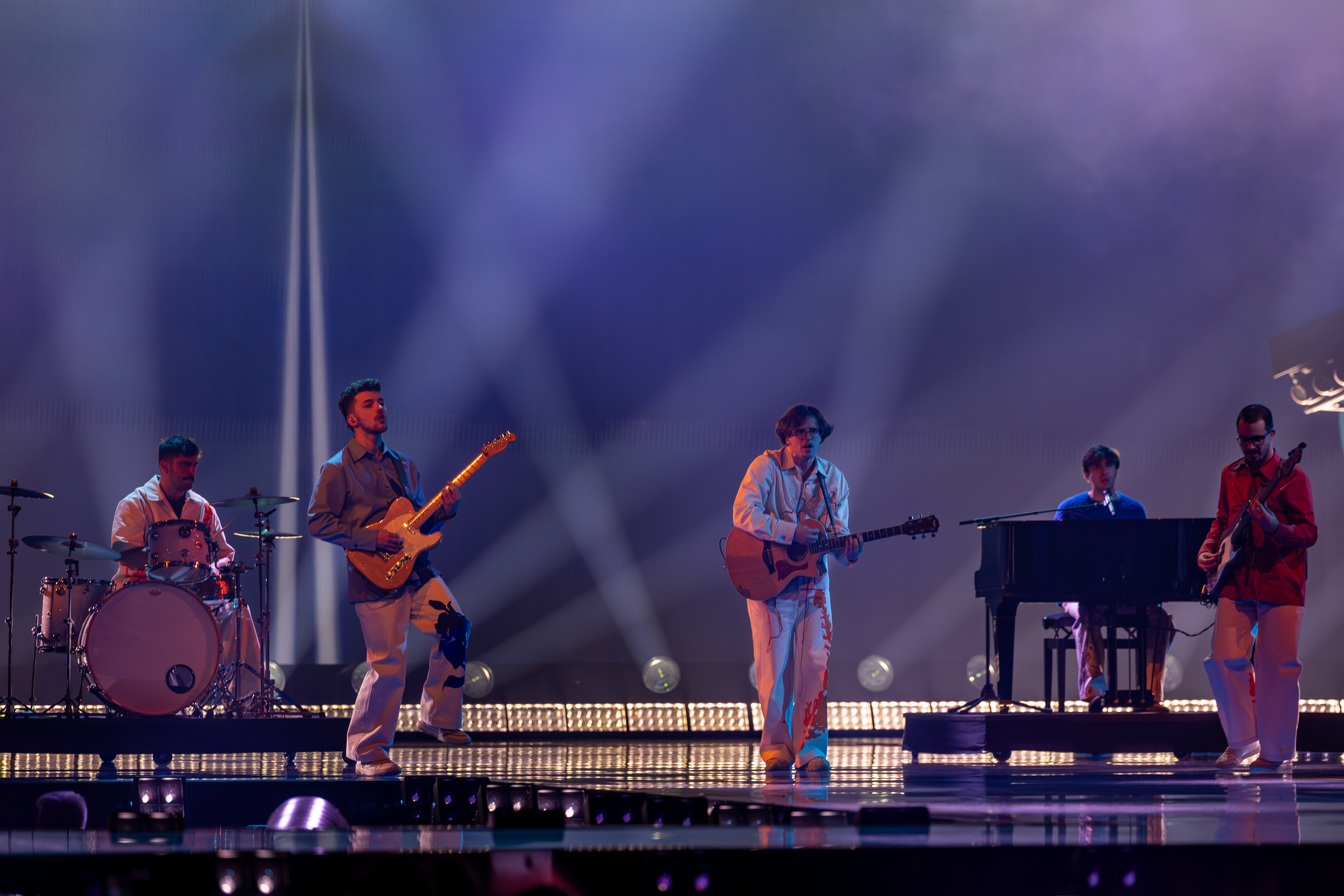
Napa performing "Deslocado" during the Eurovision 2025 final

The staging remained mostly similar to the one performed in Festival da Canção 2025. The performance opened with slow camera movements and a gradual zoom out as lead singer Guilherme walked slowly from the back of the stage to the front, initially avoiding the walkway. He was joined by guitarist Francisco and bassist Diogo during the first chorus. The visual design utilised a palette alternating between blue and pastel orange, with floating clouds and animated skyscapes, culminating in a final section highlighted by orange lighting and pastel hues set against a blue background, referencing Madeira's natural landscape. "Deslocado" finished ninth in the semi-final, scoring 56 points and securing a position in the grand final.

Napa performed a repeat of their performance in the grand final on 17 May. The song was performed 21st, after Malta's Miriana Conte and before Denmark's Sissal. The band finished 21st with 50 points, with a split score of 37 points from the juries and 13 points from public televoting. Regarding the former, the song not receive any sets of 12 points; the most a country gave was a seven from the Netherlands. The song also did not receive any sets of 12 points from the public televote; the most a country gave was an eight, with it being awarded by Luxembourg.

In response to their result, Napa expressed satisfaction and thanked their supporters for their "support" and "love". In a video shared on the official Festival da Canção Instagram page, the group said, "Thank you very much to everyone who voted for us". They also expressed satisfaction with their Eurovision journey, stating that they were "very happy with this path [they] are on", and added, "We feel that love. A big kiss to everyone." Guilherme, in an interview with Antena 1, described their experience as "unbelievable", "very good", and exceeding expectations.

== Cover versions ==
Following Napa's victory in Festival da Canção 2025, a cover version of the song was posted on social media by Valentyn Leshchynskyi, guitarist of Ziferblat, the Ukrainian representatives for the Eurovision Song Contest 2025. Salvador Sobral, winner of the Eurovision Song Contest 2017, posted a cover while on the streets of Uzbekistan with André Santos, one of the song's writers and producers. Several covers were also posted in the video sharing platform TikTok, including a cover from fellow Festival da Canção 2025 contestant Inês Marques Lucas.

== Credits and personnel ==
Credits are adapted via Tidal and RTP.

Musicians

- João Guilherme Gomes – lead vocals, guitar
- João Lourenço Gomes – piano, background vocals
- Francisco Sousa – guitar
- Diogo Góis – bass
- João Rodrigues – drums

Technical

- Pedro Joaquim Borges – mastering, mixing
- Luís "Twins" Pereira – recording, production
- André Santos – production
- Gabriel Silva – second engineering

== Awards and nominations ==
Awards and nominations for "Deslocado"
Year	Award	Category	Result	Ref.
2025	Gala dos Globos de Ouro	Best Song	Nominated	
2025	Quinto Canal Awards	Best National Song	Nominated	
2026	PLAY - Portuguese Music Awards	Vodafone Song of the Year	Nominated	

== Charts ==
Chart performance for "Deslocado"
Chart (2025)	Peak position
Bolivia (Billboard)	25
Greece International (IFPI)	66
Lithuania (AGATA)	8
Luxembourg (Billboard)	19
Netherlands (Single Tip)	9
Peru Anglo Airplay (Monitor Latino)	13
Portugal (AFP)	1
Sweden Heatseeker (Sverigetopplistan)	9
Switzerland (Schweizer Hitparade)	59

== Certifications ==
Certifications and sales for "Deslocado"
Region	Certification	Certified units/sales
Brazil (Pro-Música Brasil)	2× Platinum	80,000^{‡}
Portugal (AFP)	4× Platinum	100,000^{‡}
^{‡} Sales+streaming figures based on certification alone.

== Release history ==
Release dates and formats for "Deslocado"
Region	Date	Format(s)	Version	Label	Ref.
Various	23 January 2025	Digital download; streaming	Compilation track	Sony Music	
Various	10 March 2025	Digital download; streaming	Original	Universal	

== See also ==
- List of number-one singles of 2025 (Portugal)
