= Arena Burgas =

Multifunctional indoor arena in Burgas, Bulgaria

Coordinates: 42.5247°N 27.4558°E

- Interactive map of Arena Burgas
- Address: zh.k. Izgrev, bul. "Stefan Stambolov" 79, 8008
- Location: Burgas, Bulgaria
- Owner: Municipal Council of Burgas
- Capacity: 4,100–6,100 (sports); 15,000 (concerts)
- Parking: 800 spaces

Construction
- Groundbreaking: 20 October 2014
- Opened: 18 May 2023
- Cost: BGN 64 million EUR 32.7 million
- Architect: Ivaylo Petkov

Tenant
- BC Chernomorets (NBL) (2023–2024)

Arena Burgas (Bulgarian: Арена Бургас) is a multifunctional indoor arena located in Burgas, Bulgaria. After several years of delay, the arena opened on 18 May 2023. It has a fixed capacity of 4,100 for sports events, which is expandable up to 6,100 with telescopic stands, and can reach up to 15,000 for concerts when additional floor seating is combined with a standing audience.

The arena was briefly home to BC Chernomorets, who play in the NBL, the top flight of Bulgarian basketball. Arena Burgas will host the Eurovision Song Contest in May 2027.

== History ==
Construction for the arena took over eight years. After breaking ground in late 2014 with a planned budget of 38 million Bulgarian lev and a completion date of January 2017, the project was met with multiple delays and funding issues, with the final official budget figure ballooning to 64 million.

In 2022, under then-Minister of Youth and Sports Radostin Vassilev, a proposal was made to grant an additional 15 million lev in funding to finish the arena, but was unsuccessful. Following more than five years of delays, the venue was officially opened on 18 May 2023, in the presence of Bulgarian president Rumen Radev, Burgas mayor Dimitar Nikolov, and other government officials, with a playoffs match between BC Chernomorets and BC Rilski Sportist of the NBL. For this first game, due to the lack of yet installed sports equipment, the basketball hoops and flooring were borrowed from another hall in the city, the Boytcho Brantzov Hall.

The long delays, alongside the string of both successful and failed budget increases, have turned the multipurpose arena into a symbol of corruption in Burgas and Bulgaria as a whole, with Hristo Ivanov, leader of the opposition coalition Democratic Bulgaria, describing it in 2021 as the "crown jewel of corruption" under Boyko Borisov and GERB.

In 2024, the total amount disbursed by the state is estimated at approximately 52.5 million leva, in addition to an extra 6 million leva approved in 2022 by an interim government for "finishing work"; upon opening, several originally planned facilities—including a gym, a spa center, and a restaurant—remain unfinished. In April 2025, the state-owned management company Akademika 2011 EAD launched a new tender worth approximately 4.4 million leva (excluding VAT); this tender, which included provisions for an LED screen, a sports scoreboard, and volleyball and basketball equipment, was ultimately cancelled in early June 2025 due to a lack of submitted bids.

== Construction and facilities ==
It is the largest sports arena in Bulgaria, with a total floor area of approximately 50,000 m² and a playing field covering approximately 5,500 m². Its height ranges from 32 to 36 metres. The main hall features a concrete base that allows for the installation of surfaces suitable for sports such as athletics, basketball, volleyball, tennis, gymnastics, wrestling, and boxing. The facility is also equipped with storage areas and a tunnel that allows trucks carrying equipment to drive inside. The complex further includes three auxiliary halls, a three-level car park, and support facilities.

== Events ==
In 2023, the arena hosted Glory 89, a kickboxing event headlined by Petpanomrung Kiatmuu9 and David Mejia. In March 2024, it hosted the 2024 Bulgarian Basketball Cup. In 2025, Arena Burgas also hosted pool 4 of the FIVB Men's Volleyball Nations League.

In August 2026, it was announced that Arena Burgas will host the Eurovision Song Contest in May 2027.

== See also ==
- List of indoor arenas in Bulgaria

Preceded by Wiener Stadthalle; Vienna	Eurovision Song Contest; Venue; 2027	Succeeded by Incumbent
