= San Marino in the Junior Eurovision Song Contest 2026 =

- Junior Eurovision Song Contest 2026
- Participating broadcaster: San Marino RTV (SMRTV)
- Country: San Marino
- Selection process: Internal selection
- Announcement date: Artist: 8 September 2026; Song: 25 September 2026

Competing entry
- Song: "Ruota panoramica"
- Artist: Violamarie
- Songwriters: Emilio Munda; Piero Romitelli; Denny Montesi

Placement
- Final result: 4th, 148 points

Participation chronology

San Marino was represented at the Junior Eurovision Song Contest 2026 with the song "Ruota panoramica", written by Emilio Munda, Piero Romitelli and Denny Montesi, and performed by Violamarie. The Sammarinese participating broadcaster, San Marino RTV (SMRTV), internally selected its entry for the contest.

== Before Junior Eurovision ==
On 8 September 2026, SMRTV officially announced that Violamarie as the San Marinese representative for the 2026 contest. The selected song, "Ruota panoramica" was released on 25 September 2026, with the official music video being published 14 October.

== At Junior Eurovision ==
The Junior Eurovision Song Contest 2026 took place at the Malta Fairs & Conventions Centre in Ta' Qali, Malta on the 24th of October, 2026.

San Marino performed in position 5, following the entry from Montenegro and before the entry from France.

In San Marino, the event was broadcast on San Marino RTV, with the commentary team consisting of Irol and Catia Delmonte.

San Marino finished in fourth position with 148 points. This was San Marino’s best placement in the Junior Eurovision Song Contest and in any Eurovision contest.

=== Performance ===
Violamarie performed at the centre of the stage, wearing a long white dress with beading flowing down the gown and train.

Her performance of "Ruota panoramica" at the contest was staged by Kamil Staszczyszyn; he is assisted by Jacek Dybowski (as multicamera director) and Oskar Sawicki (as lighting director). The team had previously worked in an analogous position for the Polish performances at the Junior Eurovision Song Contest 2025 and the Eurovision Song Contest 2026.

=== Voting ===
The same voting system that was introduced in the 2017 edition was used, where the results were determined by 50% online voting and 50% jury voting. Every participating broadcaster assembled a national jury that consisted of three music industry professionals and two children aged between 10 and 15 who were citizens of the country they represented. The rankings of those jurors were combined to make an overall top ten.

The online voting consisted of two phases. The first phase of the online voting began on 23 October 2026 when a recap of all the rehearsal performances was shown on the contest's website Junioreurovision.tv before the viewers could vote. After this, voters also had the option to watch longer one-minute clips from each participant's rehearsal. This first round of voting ended on 24 October at 20:59 CEST. The second phase of the online voting took place during the live show and began right after the last performance and was open for 15 minutes. International viewers were able to vote for three songs. They were also able to vote for their own country's song. These votes were then turned into points which were determined by the percentage of votes received. For example, if a song received 10% of the votes, it received 10% of the available points.

San Marino received 70 points from the professional juries, placing in eighth position. The country placed second in the online vote, with 78 points. Overall, San Marino placed in fourth place with 148 points.

Points awarded to San Marino
Score	Country
12 points	Montenegro
10 points	Albania; Malta
8 points	Ireland
7 points	Cyprus
6 points	Portugal
5 points	Armenia
4 points	
3 points	Poland; Georgia
2 points	Netherlands; Spain
1 point	Ukraine; Italy
San Marino received 78 points from the online vote.

Points awarded by San Marino
Score	Country
12 points	Albania
10 points	Armenia
8 points	Malta
7 points	Italy
6 points	Georgia
5 points	Montenegro
4 points	Ireland
3 points	Spain
2 points	Ukraine
1 point	Cyprus
