= Armenia in the Junior Eurovision Song Contest 2026 =

- Junior Eurovision Song Contest 2026
- Participating broadcaster: Public Television of Armenia (AMPTV)
- Country: Armenia
- Selection process: Internal selection
- Announcement date: 23 September 2026

Competing entry
- Song: "Boo!"
- Artist: Naré
- Songwriters: Grigor Kyokchyan; Lilit Navasardyan

Placement
- Final result: 1st, 202 points

Participation chronology

Armenia was represented at the Junior Eurovision Song Contest 2026 with the song "Boo!", written by Grigor Kyokchyan and Lilit Navasardyan, and performed by Naré. The Armenian participating broadcaster, Public Television of Armenia (AMPTV), internally selected its entry for the contest.

== Background ==
Prior to the 2026 contest, Public Television of Armenia (AMPTV) had participated in the Junior Eurovision Song Contest representing Armenia seventeen times since its first entry in the 2007 contest. Since then, it has won the contest on two occasions: in 2010 with "Mama" performed by Vladimir Arzumanyan and in 2021 with "Qami Qami" performed by Maléna. It had also placed within the top three on ten occasions, more than any other country to have ever competed, and never placed outside of the top nine. AMPTV opted not to take part in the contest in 2020 due to the martial law imposed on the country as a result of the then-ongoing Second Nagorno-Karabakh War; it was then set to be represented by Maléna. In 2025, Albert competed for Armenia with the song "Brave Heart", which ended up in 4th place out of 18 entries with 175 points.

== Before Junior Eurovision ==
=== Internal selection ===
The Armenian entry for the Junior Eurovision Song Contest 2026 was internally selected by AMPTV. A submission period for interested artists was open from 18 June 2026 to 30 June 2026. Individual artists, duets, and groups consisting of up to six people were allowed to participate. At the auditions, applicants performed two well known songs of their choice. 40 acts made it to the second round of auditions, held in Yerevan between 3 and 12 July, with the competing entry commissioned by the broadcaster after the artist had been selected. On 23 September, AMPTV announced Naré would represent Armenia with the song "Boo!".

== At Junior Eurovision ==
=== Performance ===
The staging was mainly pink, purple and blue and featured feature a haunted furry castle and ghosts. In addition, the performance has a giant unicorn rocking horse prop. Naré wore a pink outfit with furry boots and hemming and was joined on stage by four dancers.

=== Voting ===
The same voting system that was introduced in the 2017 edition was used, where the results were determined by 50% online voting and 50% jury voting. Every participating broadcaster assembled a national jury that consisted of three music industry professionals and two children aged between 10 and 15 who were citizens of the country they represented. The rankings of those jurors were combined to make an overall top ten.

The online voting consisted of two phases. The first phase of the online voting began on 23 October 2026 when a recap of all the rehearsal performances was shown on the contest's website Junioreurovision.tv before the viewers could vote. After this, voters also had the option to watch longer one-minute clips from each participant's rehearsal. This first round of voting ended on 24 October at 20:59 CEST. The second phase of the online voting took place during the live show and began right after the last performance and was open for 15 minutes. International viewers were able to vote for three songs. They were also able to vote for their own country's song. These votes were then turned into points which were determined by the percentage of votes received. For example, if a song received 10% of the votes, it received 10% of the available points.

Points awarded to Armenia
Score	Country
12 points	Albania; Cyprus
10 points	Netherlands; San Marino
8 points	France; Malta; Ukraine
7 points	North Macedonia
6 points	Italy; Poland; Spain
5 points	Georgia
4 points	
3 points	Portugal
2 points	Ireland
1 point	
Armenia received 99 points from the online vote

Points awarded by Armenia
Score	Country
12 points	Cyprus
10 points	Netherlands
8 points	Malta
7 points	Georgia
6 points	France
5 points	San Marino
4 points	Spain
3 points	Poland
2 points	Italy
1 point	Ukraine
