= Portugal in the Junior Eurovision Song Contest 2026 =

- Junior Eurovision Song Contest 2026
- Participating broadcaster: Rádio e Televisão de Portugal (RTP)
- Country: Portugal
- Selection process: Artist: The Voice Kids season 7 Song: Internal selection
- Selection date: Artist: 24 May 2026; Song: 23 September 2026

Competing entry
- Song: "Alma"
- Artist: Salvador Rio
- Songwriters: Diogo Piçarra

Placement
- Final result: 13th, 64 points

Participation chronology

Portugal is set to be represented at the Junior Eurovision Song Contest 2026 with the song "Alma", written by Diogo Piçarra, and performed by Salvador Rio. The Portuguese participating broadcaster, Rádio e Televisão de Portugal (RTP), selected its artist through the seventh season of The Voice Kids, while the song was internally selected.

== Background ==
Prior to the 2025 contest, Rádio e Televisão de Portugal (RTP) participated in the Junior Eurovision Song Contest representing Portugal nine times, first entering in 2006. It finished second-last in both 2006 and 2007, and RTP withdrew after the 2007 contest, despite high viewing figures. It returned in 2017 and participated until 2019. RTP provisionally confirmed their participation in the 2020 contest, but ultimately withdrew due to the COVID-19 pandemic. Its best result came in 2024, when Victoria Nicole finished second with her song "Esperança"; winning the televote with 117 points and coming fourth with the juries receiving 96 points.

== Before Junior Eurovision ==
=== The Voice Kids (Season 7) ===
The seventh season of Portuguese The Voice Kids is a talent show broadcast on RTP1, which premiered on 19 April 2026.

==== Format ====
The competititon consisted of Blind Auditions, Semifinals and a Live Final on 24 May 2026. All coaches from the previous season returned for the seventh season. The winner of the show got the chance to represent Portugal this year.

==== Final ====
The final took place on 24 May 2026 at the RTP Studios in Lisbon. The final consisted of two rounds of voting. In the first round, four of the artists advanced to the second round. In the second round the artist performed their blind audition songs. In both the rounds the public vote decided the winners. Salvador Rio won the competition and automatically became the representative of Portugal this year.

== At Junior Eurovision ==
The Junior Eurovision Song Contest 2026 took place at the Malta Fairs & Conventions Centre in Ta' Qali, Malta on 24 October 2026.

In Portugal, the event was broadcast live on RTP2, with commentary provided by Carina Jorge and José Carlos Malato. The contest attracted 75.564 viewers and a 1,63% share on RTP2 in average, being the least-watched Junior Eurovision to date.

=== Voting ===
The same voting system that was introduced in the 2017 edition was used, where the results were determined by 50% online voting and 50% jury voting. Every participating broadcaster assembled a national jury that consisted of three music industry professionals and two children aged between 10 and 15 who were citizens of the country they represented. The rankings of those jurors were combined to make an overall top ten.

The online voting consisted of two phases. The first phase of the online voting began on 23 October 2026 when a recap of all the rehearsal performances was shown on the contest's website Junioreurovision.tv before the viewers could vote. After this, voters also had the option to watch longer one-minute clips from each participant's rehearsal. This first round of voting ended on 24 October at 20:59 CEST. The second phase of the online voting took place during the live show and began right after the last performance and was open for 15 minutes. International viewers were able to vote for three songs. They were also able to vote for their own country's song. These votes were then turned into points which were determined by the percentage of votes received. For example, if a song received 10% of the votes, it received 10% of the available points.

Points awarded to Portugal
Score	Country
12 points	
10 points	
8 points	
7 points	France
6 points	
5 points	
4 points	Spain
3 points	Ukraine
2 points	
1 point	
Portugal received 50 points from the online vote

Points awarded by Portugal
Score	Country
12 points	France
10 points	Netherlands
8 points	Poland
7 points	Spain
6 points	San Marino
5 points	Ukraine
4 points	Malta
3 points	Armenia
2 points	Georgia
1 point	Ireland
