= Italy in the Junior Eurovision Song Contest 2026 =

- Junior Eurovision Song Contest 2026
- Participating broadcaster: Radiotelevisione italiana (RAI)
- Country: Italy
- Selection process: Internal selection
- Announcement date: Artist: 16 September 2026; Song: 25 September 2026

Competing entry
- Song: "Che cos’è l’amore?"
- Artist: Matteo Trullu
- Songwriters: Gregorio Castellani; Fabio Zanolini; Luca Faccini

Placement
- Final result: 11th, 87 points

Participation chronology

Italy was represented at the Junior Eurovision Song Contest 2026 with the song "Che cos’è l’amore?", written by Gregorio Castellani, Fabio Zanolini and Luca Faccini, and performed by Matteo Trullu. The Italian participating broadcaster, Radiotelevisione italiana (RAI), internally selected its entry for the contest.

Italy finished in eleventh position with 87 points.

== Background ==
Prior to the 2026 contest, Italy has participated in the Junior Eurovision Song Contest eleven times since its debut in 2014, having won the contest on their first appearance with the song "Tu primo grande amore", performed by Vincenzo Cantiello. On the country's most recent appearance, in 2025, RAI internally selected Leonardo Giovannangeli to represent Italy at the contest with the song "Rockstar". He achieved 12th place with 73 points.

== Before Junior Eurovision ==
On 2 June 2026, RAI officially confirmed its intention to participate in 2026 and announced that its entrant for the 2026 contest would be selected from the The Voice Kids. On 16 September, RAI announced Matteo Trullu, the winner of the fourth season of The Voice Kids, as the Italian entrant with the song "Che cos’è l’amore?", which was written by Gregorio Castellani, Fabio Zanolini and Luca Faccini, and released on 25 September alongside an accompanying music video.

== At Junior Eurovision ==
The Junior Eurovision Song Contest 2026 took place at the Malta Fairs & Conventions Centre in Ta' Qali, Malta on 24 October 2026.

Italy performed in position 10, following the entry from Malta and before the entry from Ukraine.

In Italy, the event was broadcast live on Rai Gulp and RaiPlay, with commentary provided by Mario Acampa. The contest attracted 21.000 viewers and a 0,1% share on Rai Gulp in average, being the second least-watched Junior Eurovision to date and the lowest figure since the 2021 contest.

=== Performance ===
Truzzu was joined on stage by a dancer, namely Giulia Pincella. During his performance he played two different musical instruments, a piano and his distinctive yellow guitar. Truzzu wore a matching dark navy set with an embroidered botanical pattern in muted gold and silver tones, an open-front jacket over a plain t-shirt, and trousers in the same embroidered fabric. The guitar solo featured in the performance was played live by Truzzu himself.

His performance of "Che cos'è l'amore" was directed by Alex Uhlmann, creative director of The Voice Kids, and choreographed by Federica Di Marzo.

=== Voting ===
The same voting system that was introduced in the 2017 edition was used, where the results were determined by 50% online voting and 50% jury voting. Every participating broadcaster assembled a national jury that consisted of three music industry professionals and two children aged between 10 and 15 who were citizens of the country they represented. The rankings of those jurors were combined to make an overall top ten.

The online voting consisted of two phases. The first phase of the online voting began on 23 October 2026 when a recap of all the rehearsal performances was shown on the contest's website Junioreurovision.tv before the viewers could vote. After this, voters also had the option to watch longer one-minute clips from each participant's rehearsal. This first round of voting ended on 24 October at 20:59 CEST. The second phase of the online voting took place during the live show and began right after the last performance and was open for 15 minutes. International viewers were able to vote for three songs. They were also able to vote for their own country's song. These votes were then turned into points which were determined by the percentage of votes received. For example, if a song received 10% of the votes, it received 10% of the available points.

Italy received 41 points from the professional juries, placing in tenth position. The country placed thirteen in the online vote, with 46 points. Overall, Italy placed in eleventh place with 87 points.

Points awarded to Italy
Score	Country
12 points	
10 points	France
8 points	
7 points	San Marino
6 points	North Macedonia
5 points	Cyprus
4 points	Georgia
3 points	Malta; Spain
2 points	Armenia
1 point	Netherlands
Italy received 46 points from the online vote.

Points awarded by Italy
Score	Country
12 points	Georgia
10 points	Spain
8 points	France
7 points	Malta
6 points	Armenia
5 points	Ireland
4 points	Netherlands
3 points	Poland
2 points	Cyprus
1 point	San Marino
