= Naré Kerobyan =

Armenian singer (born 2013)

Naré Նարե
- Born: Nare Kerobyan; 12 August 2013 (age 13); Yerevan, Armenia
- Occupation: Singer
- Instrument: Vocals
- Years active: 2026–present

Nare Kerobyan (Նարե Քերոբյան; born 12 August 2013), known professionally as Naré, is an Armenian child singer. She represented Armenia in the Junior Eurovision Song Contest 2026 with the song "Boo!" and won the competition with 202 points.

== Early life ==
Naré Kerobyan was born on 12 August 2013 in Yerevan, Armenia, to Vahan Kerobyan, a politician, businessman, mathematician and former Minister of Economy of Armenia, and Mariam Harutyunyan. She has sister Nane and three brothers: Samvel, Avet and Alexander.

== Career ==
Kerobyan began singing at the age of five. Before participating in Junior Eurovision, she appeared in musicals and television programmes in Armenia.

=== Junior Eurovision Song Contest 2026 ===
On 23 September 2026, the Public Television Company of Armenia (AMPTV) announced that she would represent Armenia in the Junior Eurovision Song Contest 2026. She was selected through an audition process involving more than 100 applicants, with 40 singers progressing to auditions in Yerevan. She had applied on three previous occasions, making 2026 her fourth attempt to represent Armenia.

Her entry, "Boo!", written and composed by Grigor Kyokchyan and Lilit Navasardyan, was released with a music video on 23 September 2026. Sung in Armenian and English, the song addresses childhood fears through imagery associated with games and imagination.

At the contest on 24 October 2026 at the Malta Fairs & Conventions Centre (MFCC) in Ta' Qali, Malta, Naré won with 202 points, giving Armenia its third victory. Her total consisted of 103 points from national juries and 99 points from online voting.

== Discography ==
=== Singles ===
Year	Title	Ref.
2026	"Boo!"	

Awards and achievements
Preceded by (France) Lou Deleuze with "Ce monde"	Winner of the Junior Eurovision Song Contest; 2026	Succeeded by N/A
Preceded by Albert with "Brave Heart"	Armenia in the Junior Eurovision Song Contest; 2026	Succeeded by N/A
