= Junior Eurovision Song Contest 2026 =

International song competition

- Join the Festa (Note: While "United by Music" has been the permanent slogan of the contest since 2025, the Maltese host broadcaster PBS adopted "Join the Festa" as its motto for the 2026 edition specifically.)

Date and venue
- Final: 24 October 2026
- Venue: Malta Fairs & Conventions Centre; Ta' Qali, Malta

Organisation
- Organiser: European Broadcasting Union (EBU)
- ESC director: Martin Green
- ESC executive producer: Gert Kark

Production
- Host broadcaster: Public Broadcasting Services (PBS)
- Director: Jeremy Dalli; Mark Vassallo
- Executive producer: Keith Chetcuti
- Presenters: Gaia Cauchi; Destiny Chukunyere; Keane Cutajar

Participants
- Number of entries: 16
- Non-returning countries: Azerbaijan; Croatia
- Participation map: Competing countries Countries that participated in the past but not in 2026

Vote
- Voting system: The professional jury of each country awards a set of 12, 10, 8–1 points to 10 songs. Viewers around the world vote for 3 songs, and their votes are distributed proportionally. The votes of the jury and the audience make up 50% of all votes.
- Winning song: Armenia "Boo!"

The Junior Eurovision Song Contest 2026 was the 24th edition of the Junior Eurovision Song Contest, held on 24 October 2026 at the Malta Fairs & Conventions Centre in Ta' Qali, Malta, and presented by Gaia Cauchi, Destiny Chukunyere, and Keane Cutajar. It was organised by the European Broadcasting Union (EBU) and host broadcaster Public Broadcasting Services (PBS). It was the third time that Malta has hosted the contest, having previously done so in 2014 and 2016, as well as the first contest to be held in October.

Broadcasters from sixteen countries participated in the contest, with Azerbaijan and Croatia both opting not to participate after doing so the previous year.

The winner was Armenia with the song "Boo!" by Naré, its third win and first since 2021. Spain, France, San Marino, and Georgia completed the top five, with France winning the jury vote for the sixth time in the last seven contests. San Marino and Montenegro achieved their best placements in any Eurovision event, finishing fourth and twelfth respectively. Albania recorded its second-lowest placing to date, while North Macedonia finished last for the fourth time.

== Location ==
Location of Ta' Qali, where the contest venue is located (in blue)

Unlike the Eurovision Song Contest, the winning broadcaster of the previous year's Junior Eurovision Song Contest does not automatically receive the right to host the next contest. However, since 2011 (with the exceptions of 2012, 2015, 2018, and 2024) it has become customary for winners to take on hosting duties, and since 2019, the winning broadcaster has had the right of first refusal on hosting the following competition.

On 18 December 2025, French broadcaster France Télévisions, which won the 2025 contest, announced that it would not host in 2026 due to financial reasons. This was the second time that the broadcaster declined to host after winning, the first being in 2024. Sammarinese broadcaster San Marino RTV (SMRTV) subsequently announced it would bid to host the contest.

On 15 May 2026, the EBU announced that Public Broadcasting Services (PBS) had been selected to host the 2026 contest at the Malta Fairs & Conventions Centre in Ta' Qali, Malta. It was the third time that the contest was held in Malta, with PBS having previously hosted it in 2014 and 2016. In addition to the main venue, St Paul's Square in Qawra was the location of the Junior Eurovision Pjazza, which was inspired by Malta's patronal festival and featured activities for visitors during the week leading up to the contest.

== Participants ==
Eligibility for participation in the Junior Eurovision Song Contest requires a national broadcaster with an EBU membership capable of receiving the contest via the Eurovision network and broadcasting it live nationwide. The EBU issues an invitation to participate in the contest to all members.

On 24 July 2026, the EBU announced that broadcasters from 16 countries would participate in the 2026 contest. Azerbaijan and Croatia opted not to compete after making one-off appearances the previous year. For the first time since 2008, there were no returning or debuting countries.

Prior to the contest, a digital compilation album featuring all the songs from the 2026 contest was put together by the EBU and released by Universal Music Group on 9 October 2026.

Junior Eurovision Song Contest 2026 participants
Country	Broadcaster	Artist	Song	Language	Songwriter(s)	Ref.
Albania	RTSH	Eslin Kurti	"Kërce me mua"	Albanian	Enis Mullaj; Eriona Rushiti	
Armenia	AMPTV	Naré	"Boo!"	Armenian, English	Grigor Kyokchyan; Lilit Navasardyan	
Cyprus	CyBC	Harry Georgiou	"Who I Can Be"	Greek, English	Anna-Klara Folin; Laurell Barker; Nathalie Brydolf; Thomas Stengaard; Victoria Chalkitis	
France	France Télévisions	Alec	"Comment tu vas?"	French	Alec Burette; Malory Legardinier	
Georgia	GPB	Davit Lomidze	"Sun on the Rooftops"	Georgian	Giorgi Kukhianidze; Irina Sanikidze	
Ireland	TG4	Caleb Kirwan and Naomi Gribben	"Níos láidre"	Irish	Ben Pyne; Larissa Tormey; Remy Borsboom; Shauna Carrick	
Italy	RAI	Matteo Trullu	"Che cos'è l'amore?"	Italian	Fabio Zanolini; Gregorio Castellani; Luca Faccini	
Malta	PBS	Beppe	"Blue Bird"	English	Beppe Caruana; Matthew Caruana; Matthew James Borg; Matthew Mercieca	
Montenegro	RTCG	Mija Vujović	"Muzika nas spaja" (Музика нас спаја)	Montenegrin	Marko Kon; Vasilije Čolan	
Netherlands	AVROTROS	Maria	"Stronger Together"	Dutch, English	Mell Jonk; Ton Dijkman	
North Macedonia	MRT	Ana Stojanoska	"Idnata jas" (Идната јас)	Macedonian	Ilcho Nechovski; Nikola Micevski	
Poland	TVP	Wiktor Sas	"Gravity"	Polish, English	Antoni Alagierski; Małgorzata Uściłowska; Mikołaj Trybulec; Ulrich Harrison (Note: Jeremi Sikorski and Tomasz Pacholczyk were added to the songwriting credits for "Gravity" after the contest.)	
Portugal	RTP	Salvador Rio	"Alma"	Portuguese	Diogo Piçarra	
San Marino	SMRTV	Violamarie	"Ruota panoramica"	Italian, English	Denny Montesi; Emilio Munda; Piero Romitelli	
Spain	RTVE	Lucas Paulano	"Cuore bello (te quiero, te quiero)"	Spanish	Blas Cantó; Carlos Almazán; Daniel Ángelo Ortega; Lucas Paulano	
Ukraine	Suspilne	Erika Kolesnichenko	"Not a Lullaby"	Ukrainian, English	Svitlana Tarabarova	

== Production ==
The date of the contest, 24 October, is earlier than usual, with most editions having been staged in November. According to PBS, this was for logistical reasons. Rehearsals in the venue began on 12 October, focusing on the opening and interval acts. The first rehearsals with the artists took place on 18 and 19 October, with each country allowed 30 minutes total on stage, followed by the second rehearsals on 20 and 21 October.

=== Visual and stage design ===
On 7 September 2026, PBS unveiled the official theme art and stage design for the 2026 contest. The artwork, named "The Festa", is inspired by the Feast of St. Paul's Shipwreck and features colourful curves and geometric shapes that frame the generic logo, evoking the festive decorations that characterise the festival. The stage design features a central performance area surrounded by elements inspired by Maltese streets, including colourful façades and traditional balconies.

=== Presenters ===
On 15 September 2026, it was announced that Gaia Cauchi, Destiny Chukunyere, and Keane Cutajar would be the presenters of the show. The trio had previously hosted the Malta Eurovision Song Contest 2026. Cauchi and Chukunyere won the contest in 2013 and 2015, respectively; Chukunyere later represented Malta in the Eurovision Song Contest 2021.

== Contest overview ==
The event took place on 24 October 2026 at 21:00 CEST. Sixteen countries participated, with the running order published on 28 September. All the countries competing are eligible to vote with the jury vote, as well as participating and non-participating countries under an aggregated international online vote. Armenia won with 202 points, winning the online vote. Spain came second with 184 points, with France, who won the jury vote, San Marino, and Georgia completing the top five. Montenegro, Portugal, Ireland, Albania, and North Macedonia occupied the bottom five positions.

The opening of the show featured the traditional flag parade, accompanied by presenters Gaia Cauchi, Destiny Chukunyere, and Keane Cutajar performing the theme song "Ramdamdiridam". The interval acts included a musical number titled "Obsessed with (Junior) Eurovision" which celebrates Malta's history in both the junior and adult Eurovision contests, featuring the presenters alongside Eliza Borg, who represented Malta in 2025, and Miriana Conte, who had done so in the Eurovision Song Contest 2025; 2025 winner Lou Deleuze and Eurovision Song Contest 2026 winner Dara performing a mashup of their respective winning songs "Ce monde" and "Bangaranga"; and all participants performing the common song "Join the Festa".

R/O	Country	Artist	Song	Points	Place
1	Netherlands	Maria	"Stronger Together"	126	8
2	Cyprus	Harry Georgiou	"Who I Can Be"	98	10
3	Portugal	Salvador Rio	"Alma"	64	13
4	Montenegro	Mija Vujović	"Muzika nas spaja"	68	12
5	San Marino	Violamarie	"Ruota panoramica"	148	4
6	France	Alec	"Comment tu vas?"	165	3
7	Poland	Wiktor Sas	"Gravity"	144	6
8	Armenia	Naré	"Boo!"	202	1
9	Malta	Beppe	"Blue Bird"	136	7
10	Italy	Matteo Trullu	"Che cos'è l'amore?"	87	11
11	Ukraine	Erika Kolesnichenko	"Not a Lullaby"	106	9
12	North Macedonia	Ana Stojanoska	"Idnata jas"	57	16
13	Ireland	Caleb Kirwan and Naomi Gribben	"Níos láidre"	64	14
14	Albania	Eslin Kurti	"Kërce me mua"	62	15
15	Georgia	Davit Lomidze	"Sun on the Rooftops"	145	5
16	Spain	Lucas Paulano	"Cuore bello (te quiero, te quiero)"	184	2

=== Spokespersons ===
The following spokespersons announced the 12-point score from each country's national jury:

1. Netherlands – Meadow
2. Cyprus – Christos Georgiou
3. Portugal – Inês Gonçalves
4. Montenegro – Asja Džogović
5. San Marino – Liam
6. France – Zoé Clauzure
7. Poland – Marianna Kłos
8. Armenia – Albert
9. Malta – Chanel Monseigneur
10. Italy – Michael
11. Ukraine – Sofiia Nersesian
12. North Macedonia – Nela Mančeska
13. Ireland – Dory Hudson
14. Albania – Viola Gjyzeli
15. Georgia – Anita Abgariani
16. Spain – Gonzalo Pinillos

== Detailed voting results ==
Split results
Place	Combined		Jury		Online vote	
Place	Country	Points	Country	Points	Country	Points
1	Armenia	202	France	114	Armenia	99
2	Spain	184	Spain	108	San Marino	78
3	France	165	Armenia	103	Spain	76
4	San Marino	148	Georgia	94	Ukraine	68
5	Georgia	145	Malta	86	Poland	61
6	Poland	144	Poland	83	Montenegro	59
7	Malta	136	Netherlands	71	Netherlands	55
8	Netherlands	126	San Marino	70	France; Georgia; North Macedonia	51
9	Ukraine	106	Cyprus	52	France; Georgia; North Macedonia	51
10	Cyprus	98	Italy	41	France; Georgia; North Macedonia	51
11	Italy	87	Ukraine	38	Malta; Portugal	50
12	Montenegro	68	Ireland	20	Malta; Portugal	50
13	Portugal	64	Albania	19	Cyprus; Italy	46
14	Ireland	64	Portugal	14	Cyprus; Italy	46
15	Albania	62	Montenegro	9	Ireland	44
16	North Macedonia	57	North Macedonia	6	Albania	43

Detailed voting results of the final
Voting procedure used: 100% Online vote 100% Jury vote		Total score	Jury vote score	Online vote score	Jury vote															
Voting procedure used: 100% Online vote 100% Jury vote		Total score	Jury vote score	Online vote score	Netherlands	Cyprus	Portugal	Montenegro	San Marino	France	Poland	Armenia	Malta	Italy	Ukraine	North Macedonia	Ireland	Albania	Georgia	Spain
Competing countries	Netherlands	126	71	55		3	10			3	8	10	1	4	5		12	7	8	
Competing countries	Cyprus	98	52	46	7			7	1		4	12	5	2	2	5	4		2	1
Competing countries	Portugal	64	14	50						7					3					4
Competing countries	Montenegro	68	9	59					5	1								3		
Competing countries	San Marino	148	70	78	2	7	6	12			3	5	10	1	1		8	10	3	2
Competing countries	France	165	114	51	12	4	12	5			12	6	4	8	10	12	10		7	12
Competing countries	Poland	144	83	61	6	8	8	4		6		3	7	3	12	8	5		6	7
Competing countries	Armenia	202	103	99	10	12	3		10	8	6		8	6	8	7	2	12	5	6
Competing countries	Malta	136	86	50	3	6	4	10	8			8		7	4	4	7	5	12	8
Competing countries	Italy	87	41	46	1	5			7	10		2	3			6			4	3
Competing countries	Ukraine	106	38	68	5	1	5	3	2	4	5	1	2			3		1	1	5
Competing countries	North Macedonia	57	6	51				1		2	1							2		
Competing countries	Ireland	64	20	44			1	2	4		2			5				6		
Competing countries	Albania	62	19	43		2			12							2	3			
Competing countries	Georgia	145	94	51	8		2	8	6	12	10	7	6	12	7	1	1	4		10
Competing countries	Spain	184	108	76	4	10	7	6	3	5	7	4	12	10	6	10	6	8	10	

=== 12 points ===
Below is a summary of all 12 points received from each country's professional juries.

12 points awarded by juries
#	Recipient	Countries giving 12 points
5	France	Netherlands, North Macedonia, Poland, Portugal, Spain
2	Armenia	Albania, Cyprus
2	Georgia	France, Italy
1	Albania	San Marino
1	Cyprus	Armenia
1	Malta	Georgia
1	Netherlands	Ireland
1	Poland	Ukraine
1	San Marino	Montenegro
1	Spain	Malta

== Broadcasts ==
All participating broadcasters may choose to have on-site or remote commentators providing insight and voting information to their local audience. Some non-participating broadcasters also air the contest. The Junior Eurovision Song Contest YouTube channel provides an international live stream of the contest with no commentary. According to the EBU, 11 million viewers watched the contest live across 11 recorded markets.

Confirmed broadcasts and commentators in participating countries
Country	Broadcaster	Channel(s)	Commentator(s)	Ref.
Albania	RTSH	RTSH 1, RTSH Muzikë, Radio Tirana 1	Andri Xhahu	
Armenia	AMPTV	Armenia 1	Hamlet Arakelyan and Hrachuhi Utmazyan	
Cyprus	CyBC	RIK 1, RΙΚ HD, RΙΚ SAT, CyBC Radio 1	Kyriakos Pastides	
France	France Télévisions	France 4	Stéphane Bern	
Georgia	GPB	First Channel	Nika Lobiladze	
Ireland	TG4		Louise Cantillon	
Italy	RAI	Rai Gulp, Rai Italia	Mario Acampa	
Malta	PBS	TVM, TVM+	No commentator	
Montenegro	RTCG	TVCG 2	Antonela Martinović and Vlado Perović	
Netherlands	AVROTROS	NPO 3	Rob Janssen and Matheu Hinzen	
North Macedonia	MRT	MRT 1, Radio Skopje	Zorica Nikolovska and Vane Markoski	
Poland	TVP	TVP2, TVP Polonia, TVP ABC	Artur Orzech	
Portugal	RTP	RTP2	Carina Jorge and José Carlos Malato	
San Marino	SMRTV	San Marino RTV, Radio San Marino	Irol and Catia Demonte	
Spain	RTVE	La 1, TVE Internacional	Julia Varela and Tony Aguilar	
Ukraine	Suspilne	Suspilne Kultura	Timur Miroshnychenko	

Confirmed broadcasts and commentators in non-participating countries
Country	Broadcaster	Channel(s)	Commentator(s)	Ref.
Kosovo	RTK	RTK 1, Radio Kosova 1	Nora Meqa and Dafina Smajli	

== See also ==
- Eurovision Song Contest 2026
- Eurovision Young Musicians 2026
- Eurovision Song Contest Asia 2026
