= The Voice Kids (Portuguese TV series) season 7 =

The Voice Kids
- Season 7
- Promotional poster featuring coaches Cristovinho, Piçarra, Nena, and Roseta
- Hosted by: Catarina Furtado; Maria Petronilho (backstage)
- Coaches: Diogo Piçarra; Nena; Miguel Cristovinho; Cuca Roseta
- No. of contestants: 24
- Winner: Salvador Rio
- Winning coach: Diogo Piçarra
- Runners-up: Ana Rita Torres; Daniela Fontão; Vitória Fernandes

Release
- Original network: RTP1
- Original release: 19 April – 24 May 2026

Season chronology
- ← Previous; Season 6

The seventh season of Portuguese The Voice Kids is a talent show broadcast on RTP1, which premiered on 19 April 2026. All coaches from the previous season returned for the seventh season, marking the first time in the history of the show that all coaches returned from the previous season; Cuca Roseta returned for her third season while Diogo Piçarra, Miguel Cristovinho, and Nena returned for their second seasons each. Catarina Furtado returned as the host and Maria Petronilho returned as backstage presenter.

Salvador Rio won the competition on 24 May 2026, marking Diogo Piçarra's first win as a coach. Prior to the season airing, it was officially confirmed that the winner would represent Portugal in the Junior Eurovision Song Contest 2026 after the previous five winners represented Portugal in the competition. Upon winning, Rio automatically became Portugal's entry in the contest.

== Teams ==
Colour key

- Winner
- Runner-up
- Eliminated in the Finals
- Eliminated in the Semifinals
- Withdrew

Coaching teams
| Coaches | Top 24 Artists | | |
|---|---|---|---|
| Diogo Piçarra | | | |
| Diogo Piçarra | Salvador Rio | Duarte Alves | Maria Leonor Antunes |
| Diogo Piçarra | Jorge Godinho | Mariana Jorge | Salomé Pinho |
| Nena | | | |
| Nena | Vitória Fernandes | Maria Luíza Pinheiro | António & Vasco Martins |
| Nena | Eva Moreira | Mia Ribeiro | Giovanna Silva |
| Miguel Cristovinho | | | |
| Miguel Cristovinho | Ana Rita Torres | Madalena Chaves | Samuel Aguiar |
| Miguel Cristovinho | Martim Cabral | Leonor Lopes | Luz Confino |
| Cuca Roseta | | | |
| Cuca Roseta | Daniela Fontão | Lara Ferreira | Amarílys Câmara |
| Cuca Roseta | Maria Eduarda | Lara Invêncio | Carolina Rodrigues |

== Blind auditions ==
Unlike the previous three seasons, in the blind auditions (Provas Cegas), each coach was only given one superblock to use and prevent another coach from pitching for the artist. The superblock buttons could be used at any time until the artist has finished their audition. Additionally, each coach could use one 'Mega Block', which defaults the artist to their team.

This season, the team sizes were greatly reduced with each coach only receiving six spots on their team.

Blind auditions colour key
| ✔ | Coach pressed the "EU QUERO" button |
| | Artist defaulted to this coach's team |
| | Artist elected to join this coach's team |
| | Artist was eliminated with no coach pressing their button |
| ✘ | All other coaches blocked from one coach pressing the Mega Block's botton |
| ✘ | Coach presed the button "EU QUERO", but was: |
| | Blocked by Diogo; Blocked by Nena; Blocked by Cristovinho; Blocked by Cuca |

=== Episode 1 (19 April) ===
Roseta's son, Lopo, auditioned after Mariana Maia, performing Michael Bublé's "Home". Roseta immediately recognised his voice, and all four coaches turned their chairs at the same time. The audition marked Lopo's television debut.

| Order | Artist | Song | Coach's and artist's choices | | | |
| Order | Artist | Song | Diogo | Nena | Cristovinho | Cuca |
|---|---|---|---|---|---|---|
| 1 | Maria Leonor Antunes | "I Will Always Love You" | ✔ | ✔ | ✔ | ✔ |
| 2 | Carolina Rodrigues | "Wishing You Were Somehow Here Again" | – | ✔ | ✔ | ✔ |
| 3 | Salvador Rio | "No Teu Poema" | ✔ | ✔ | ✔ | ✔ |
| 4 | Gabriel Cordeiro | "Gotinha de Água" | – | – | – | – |
| 5 | Madalena Chaves | "Wildflower" | – | – | ✔ | ✔ |
| 6 | Mia Ribeiro | "Rise Up" | – | ✔ | – | – |
| 7 | Henrique Calado | "Prometo" | – | – | – | – |
| 8 | Eva Moreira | "Warrior" | ✘ | ✔ | ✘ | – |
| 9 | Samuel Aguiar | "Para Os Braços da Minha Mãe" | – | – | ✔ | – |
| 10 | Emilia & Dominika | "What Dreams Are Made Of" | – | – | – | – |
| 11 | Salomé Pinho | "Paz" | ✔ | ✘ | ✔ | – |
| 12 | Mariana Maia | "I Dreamed a Dream" | – | – | – | – |
| 13 | Daniela Fontão | "La Cigarra" | ✘ | ✘ | ✘ | ✔ |

=== Episode 2 (26 April) ===
| Order | Artist | Song | Coach's and artist's choices | | | |
| Order | Artist | Song | Diogo | Nena | Cristovinho | Cuca |
|---|---|---|---|---|---|---|
| 1 | Sofia Cunha | "Frágil" | – | – | – | – |
| 2 | Duarte Alves | "Fui Colher uma Romã" | ✔ | ✘ | ✘ | ✘ |
| 3 | Francisca Oliveira | "Eu Sei" | – | – | – | – |
| 4 | Lara Ferreira | "Creep" | ✘ | ✔ | ✔ | ✔ |
| 5 | Maria Eduarda | "Desfolhada" | ✔ | ✔ | – | ✔ |
| 6 | Madalena Pereira | "Traitor" | – | – | – | – |
| 7 | Giovanna Silva | "Fora do Mar" | – | ✔ | – | – |
| 8 | Tiago Jesus | "Mãe" | – | – | – | – |
| 9 | Vitória Fernandes | "She Used to Be Mine" | – | ✔ | ✘ | – |
| 10 | Mia Vinderinho | "Dores de Cresciment" | – | – | – | – |
| 11 | Lara Invêncio | "Ai Maria" | – | – | – | ✔ |
| 12 | Daniel Luz | "Always Remember Us This Way" | – | – | – | – |
| 13 | Martim Cabral | "Habits" | ✘ | ✘ | ✔ | – |

=== Episode 3 (3 May) ===
| Order | Artist | Song | Coach's and artist's choices | | | |
| Order | Artist | Song | Diogo | Nena | Cristovinho | Cuca |
|---|---|---|---|---|---|---|
| 1 | Ana Rita Torres | "Canto della Terra" | – | ✔ | ✔ | – |
| 2 | António & Vasco Martins | "Riptide" | ✔ | ✔ | ✘ | – |
| 3 | Leonor Lopes | "Não Faz Mal Não Estar Bem" | ✔ | – | ✔ | – |
| 4 | Lara Baptista | "Portas do Sol" | – | – | – | – |
| 5 | Jorge Godinho | "Count On Me" | ✔ | – | – | – |
| 6 | Leonor Guimarães | "What About Us" | – | – | – | – |
| 7 | Mariana Jorge | "Skyfall" | ✔ | – | ✔ | – |
| 8 | Tomás Gonçalves | "Stick Season" | Team full | – | – | – |
| 9 | Luz Confino | "Casa" | Team full | ✔ | ✔ | – |
| 10 | José Guerreiro | "Um Dia Hei de Voltar" | Team full | – | Team full | – |
| 11 | María Luiza Pinheiro | "Longe do Mundo" | Team full | ✔ | Team full | – |
| 12 | Matilde Custódio | "Stay a Little Longer" | Team full | Team full | Team full | – |
| 13 | Matilde Fonseca | "Voilà" | Team full | Team full | Team full | – |
| 14 | Amarílys Câmara | "Pica do 7" | Team full | Team full | Team full | ✔ |

== Semifinals ==
This season, for the second time in the program's history, following the previous season, the semifinals are pre-recorded with coaches selecting which artists from his/her team will advance to the live final. Additionally, this season is the first to go from the blind auditions directly to the semifinals.

Semifinals colour key
| Artist saved by their coach and advanced to the live final |
| Artist was eliminated |

=== Episode 4: Semifinal 1 (10 May) ===
The artists performed "Respirar" to start off the show.

Fourth episode's results
| Order | Coach | Artist | Song | Result |
|---|---|---|---|---|
| 1 | Cuca Roseta | Maria Eduarda | "Ai Coração" | Eliminated |
| 2 | Cuca Roseta | Daniela Fontão | "Qué Hay Más Allá" | Safe |
| 3 | Cuca Roseta | Lara Invêncio | "Eu Sou Lisboa" | Eliminated |
| 4 | Miguel Cristovinho | Samuel Aguiar | "When I Was Your Man" | Eliminated |
| 5 | Miguel Cristovinho | Madalena Chaves | "Lose Control" | Safe |
| 6 | Miguel Cristovinho | Leonor Lopes | "Outras Línguas" | Eliminated |
| 7 | Diogo Piçarra | Salvador Rio | "Nuvem" | Safe |
| 8 | Diogo Piçarra | Mariana Jorge | "O Senhor Extraterrestre" | Eliminated |
| 9 | Diogo Piçarra | Jorge Godinho | "Pôr do Sol" | Eliminated |
| 10 | Nena | Mia Ribeiro | "If I Ain't Got You" | Eliminated |
| 11 | Nena | Giovanna Silva | "Menina Estás Á Janela" | Eliminated |
| 12 | Nena | Maria Luíza Pinheiro | "Tomorrow" | Safe |

=== Episode 5: Semifinal 2 (17 May) ===
Luz Confino from Team Cristo withdrew from the show prior to the round; therefore, only two artists from Team Cristo performed.

The artists performed "Tu na Tua" to start off the show.

Fifth episode's results
| Order | Coach | Artist | Song | Result |
|---|---|---|---|---|
| 1 | Diogo Piçarra | Salomé Pinho | "Como Eu" | Eliminated |
| 2 | Diogo Piçarra | Maria Leonor Antunes | "Reflection" | Eliminated |
| 3 | Diogo Piçarra | Duarte Alves | "Roubei-te um Beijo" | Safe |
| 4 | Cuca Roseta | Carolina Rodrigues | "Golden" | Eliminated |
| 5 | Cuca Roseta | Amarílys Câmara | "O Tempo não Pára" | Eliminated |
| 6 | Cuca Roseta | Lara Ferreira | "Back to Black" | Safe |
| 7 | Nena | António & Vasco Martins | "Amor de Ganga" | Eliminated |
| 8 | Nena | Vitória Fernandes | "All I Want" | Safe |
| 9 | Nena | Eva Moreira | "I Surrender" | Eliminated |
| 10 | Miguel Cristovinho | Martim Cabral | "When We Were Young" | Eliminated |
| 11 | Miguel Cristovinho | Ana Rita Torres | "Con te partirò" | Safe |

== Live final ==
The live final commenced on 24 May 2026. In the first round, the final eight artists perform for one spot on their respective team to qualify for the second round based on the public's vote. In the second round, the top four artists perform their blind audition songs with one being declared the winner of the season at the end of the episode. At the end of the episode, Salvador Rio was announced as the winner of the season, marking Diogo Piçarra's first win as a coach. Rio automatically became Portugal's entry in the Junior Eurovision Song Contest 2026 following his win.

Final colour key round one
| Artist saved by the public and advanced to round two |
| Artist was eliminated |

Final colour key round two
| Artist finished as the winner of the season |
| Artist finished as a runner-up of the season |

=== Episode 6 (24 May) ===
Final results
| Round | Order | Coach | Artist | Song | Result |
|---|---|---|---|---|---|
| First (Top 8) | 1 | Cuca Roseta | Daniela Fontão | "Booneca + Highway to Hell" | Finalist |
| First (Top 8) | 2 | Diogo Piçarra | Salvador Rio | "Memória" | Finalist |
| First (Top 8) | 3 | Nena | Maria Luíza Pinheiro | "Gaivota" | Eliminated |
| First (Top 8) | 4 | Miguel Cristovinho | Madalena Chaves | "Set Fire to the Rain" | Eliminated |
| First (Top 8) | 5 | Nena | Vitória Fernandes | "You Raise Me Up" | Finalist |
| First (Top 8) | 6 | Cuca Roseta | Lara Ferreira | "Ó Gente da Minha Terra" | Eliminated |
| First (Top 8) | 7 | Miguel Cristovinho | Ana Rita Torres | "Nessus Dorma" | Finalist |
| First (Top 8) | 8 | Diogo Piçarra | Duarte Alves | "É Tão Grande o Alentejo" | Eliminated |
| Second (Top 4) | 1 | Cuca Roseta | Daniela Fontão | "La Cigarra" | Runner-up |
| Second (Top 4) | 2 | Diogo Piçarra | Salvador Rio | "No Teu Poema" | Winner |
| Second (Top 4) | 3 | Nena | Vitória Fernandes | "She Used to Be Mine" | Runner-up |
| Second (Top 4) | 4 | Miguel Cristovinho | Ana Rita Torres | "Canto della Terra" | Runner-up |

Additional performances
| Performers | Song |
|---|---|
| Cuca Roseta & her artists (Daniela Fontão & Lara Ferreira) | "Fado Jurado" |
| Diogo Piçarra & his artists (Salvador Rio & Duarte Alves) | "Porta 43" |
| Nena & her artists (Vitória Fernandes & Maria Luíza Pinheiro) | "Lembras-te de Mim?" |
| Miguel Cristovinho & his artists (Ana Rita Torres & Madalena Alves) | "Somebody That I Used to Know" |

== Elimination chart ==
Teams colour key

- Team Diogo
- Team Nena
- Team Cristo
- Team Cuca

Results colour key

- Winner
- Runner-up
- Safe
- Eliminated

Results per week
| Artist | Week 1 | Week 2 | Week 3 | |
| Artist | Week 1 | Week 2 | Round 1 | Round 2 |
|---|---|---|---|---|
| Salvador Rio | Safe | —N/a | Safe | Winner |
| Ana Rita Torres | —N/a | Safe | Safe | Runner-up |
| Daniela Fontão | Safe | —N/a | Safe | Runner-up |
| Vitória Fernandes | —N/a | Safe | Safe | Runner-up |
| Duarte Alves | —N/a | Safe | Eliminated | |
| Maria Luíza Pinheiro | Safe | —N/a | Eliminated | |
| Madalena Chaves | Safe | —N/a | Eliminated | |
| Lara Ferreira | —N/a | Safe | Eliminated | |
| Maria Leonor Antunes | —N/a | Eliminated | | |
| Salomé Pinho | —N/a | Eliminated | | |
| António & Vasco Martins | —N/a | Eliminated | | |
| Eva Moreira | —N/a | Eliminated | | |
| Martim Cabral | —N/a | Eliminated | | |
| Amarílys Câmara | —N/a | Eliminated | | |
| Carolina Rodrigues | —N/a | Eliminated | | |
| Jorge Godinho | Eliminated | | | |
| Mariana Jorge | Eliminated | | | |
| Mia Ribeiro | Eliminated | | | |
| Giovanna Silva | Eliminated | | | |
| Samuel Aguiar | Eliminated | | | |
| Leonor Lopes | Eliminated | | | |
| Maria Eduarda | Eliminated | | | |
| Lara Invêncio | Eliminated | | | |
