= That Summer in Paris =

2025 French comedy drama film

- Festival release poster
- French: Le rendez-vous de l'été
- Directed by: Valentine Cadic
- Written by: Valentine Cadic; Mariette Désert
- Produced by: Masa Sawada; Arnaud Bruttin
- Starring: Blandine Madec; India Hair; Arcadi Radeff; Matthias Jacquin; Lou Deleuze; Béryl Gastaldello
- Cinematography: Naomi Amarger
- Edited by: Lisa Raymond
- Music by: Saint DX
- Production companies: Comme des Cinémas; Cinq de Trèfle Productions
- Distributed by: New Story; Urban Sales
- Release date: 15 February 2025 (Berlinale)
- Running time: 75 minutes
- Country: France
- Language: French
- Box office: $38,506

That Summer in Paris (French: Le rendez-vous de l'été) is a 2025 French comedy drama film co-written and directed by Valentine Cadic in her directorial debut. The film revolves around Blandine, who arrives from Normandy to watch the 2024 Summer Olympics in Paris, especially swimming competitions. She navigates the chaos of Paris and an unexpected reunion.

It was selected in Perspectives and EFM at the 75th Berlin International Film Festival and was screened on 15 February 2025. It is also selected for 39th Teddy Award, and will compete for Best Feature Film.

== Synopsis ==
The film revolving around thirty-year-old Blandine and the 2024 Summer Olympics, takes viewers with Blandine from Normandy to Paris to watch the swimming competitions and to meet up with a half-sister she hasn't seen in a decade. Used to tranquility and solitude, Blandine finds herself in a lively, bustling city with unfamiliar customs. As time progresses, she encounters new people, faces confusion, hesitates, attempts to rebuild relationships, and explores a city center electrified by the extraordinary event.

== Cast ==
- Blandine Madec as Blandine
- India Hair as Julie
- Arcadi Radeff as Benjamin
- Matthias Jacquin as Paul
- Lou Deleuze as Alma
- Béryl Gastaldello as Béryl

== Production ==
The film directed by Valentine Cadic and co-written with Mariette Désert is produced by Arnaud Bruttin on behalf of Cinq de Trèfle and Masa Sawada and Antoine Jouve for Comme des Cinémas. Principal photography started on 29 July 2024, and concluded on 30 August 2024, coinciding with the 2024 Summer Olympics. The distribution in French cinemas is handled by New Story.

== Release ==
That Summer in Paris had its world premiere on 15 February 2025, as part of the 75th Berlin International Film Festival, in Perspectives.

In January 2025, Paris based Urban Sales acquired the international sales rights of the film.

It was released in the French theaters on 11 June 2025.

It was also presented in the World Cinema section at the 30th Busan International Film Festival on 18 September 2025.

It also competed in New Directors Competition at the São Paulo International Film Festival and had screening on 19 October 2025.

== Reception ==
=== Box office ===
As of 6 August 2025 the film has collected US$38,506 worldwide.

=== Critical response ===
On the AlloCiné, which lists 13 press reviews, the film obtained an average rating of 3.4/5.

== Accolades ==
The film selected in the newly formed Perspectives competition will compete for Best First Feature Award.

Award	Date of ceremony	Category	Recipient	Result	Ref.
Berlin International Film Festival	23 February 2025	GWFF Best First Feature Award	That Summer in Paris	Nominated	
Berlin International Film Festival	23 February 2025	Teddy Award for Best Short Films	That Summer in Paris	Nominated	
Lumière Awards	18 January 2026	Best First Film	That Summer in Paris	Nominated	
