= Anxiety (disambiguation) =

Anxiety is an emotion characterized by an unpleasant state of inner turmoil.

Anxiety or anxious may also refer to:

== Film and television ==
- Anxiety (1953 film), a Mexican musical drama
- Anxiety (1998 film), a Portuguese film
- "Anxiety", an episode of Quarterlife
- "Anxiety", an episode of One Day at a Time (2017 TV series)
- Anxiety (Inside Out), a character from the 2024 Pixar film Inside Out 2

== Music ==
- Anxious Records, a record label founded by Dave Stewart of Eurythmics

=== Albums ===
- Anxiety (Ladyhawke album) or the title song, 2012
- Anxiety (Smile Empty Soul album), 2005
- The Anxiety (album), a 2020 album by The Anxiety (Willow Smith and Tyler Cole)
- Anxious (album), a 2025 album by Nell Smith

=== Songs ===
- "Anxiety" (Black Eyed Peas song), 2003
- "Anxiety" (Doechii song), 2019, which the Sleepy Hallow song sampled
- "Anxiety" (Julia Michaels song), 2019
- "Anxiety" (Megan Thee Stallion song), 2022
- "Anxiety" (Sleepy Hallow song), 2023
- "Anxiety", a song by Bad Religion from the album No Control, 1989
- "Anxiety", a song by Billy Cobham from the album Spectrum, 1973
- "Anxiety", a song by Blackbear from the mixtape Cybersex, 2017
- "Anxiety", a song by Coi Leray from the album Trendsetter, 2022
- "Anxiety", a song by Jason Isbell and the 400 Unit from the album The Nashville Sound, 2017
- "Anxiety", a song by Juice Wrld from the album Legends Never Die, 2020
- "Anxiety", a song by Ramones from the album Mondo Bizarro, 1992
- "Anxiety", a song by Simple Plan from the album Harder Than It Looks, 2022
- "Anxious", a song by Carly Rae Jepsen from the album The Loneliest Time, 2022

== Places ==
- Anxiety Point, Alaska, US
- Anxious Bay, South Australia, Australia

== Other uses ==
- Anxiety (journal), a monthly medical journal, merged into Depression and Anxiety
- Anxiety (Munch), an 1894 painting by Edvard Munch
- Anxiety UK, formerly the National Phobics Society, a British charity

== See also ==
- Anxiety disorder, a psychiatric disorder characterized by excessive rumination and worrying
- Anxiety sensitivity, a fear of behaviors or sensations associated with the experience of anxiety
- Anxiety threshold, the level of anxiety that will affect a person's performance
- The Concept of Anxiety, an 1844 book by Søren Kierkegaard
