= North Macedonia in the Junior Eurovision Song Contest 2026 =

- Junior Eurovision Song Contest 2026
- Participating broadcaster: Macedonian Radio Television (MRT)
- Country: North Macedonia
- Selection process: Internal selection
- Announcement date: 16 June 2026

Competing entry
- Song: "Idnata jas"
- Artist: Ana Stojanoska
- Songwriters: Ilcho Nechovski; Nikola Micevski

Placement
- Final result: 16th, 57 points

Participation chronology

North Macedonia will be represented at the Junior Eurovision Song Contest 2026 with the song "Idnata jas", written by Ilcho Nechovski and Nikola Micevski, and performed by Ana Stojanoska. The Macedonian participating broadcaster, Macedonian Radio Television (MRT), selected its entry internally.

== Background ==
Prior to the 2026 contest, North Macedonia had participated in the Junior Eurovision Song Contest twenty times, since its debut at the inaugural contest in 2003. North Macedonia were absent three times from the Junior Eurovision Song Contest in 2012 and 2014 and 2020. They have never won the contest, with their best results being at the 2007 and 2008, represented by the duo Rosica Kulakova and Dimitar Stojmenovski, and Bobi Andonov respectively, achieving fifth place. In the 2025 contest, Nela Mančeska represented the country with the song "Miracle" and placed 7th out of 18 countries; their best result since 2019.

== Before Junior Eurovision ==
=== Internal selection ===
MRT confirmed its intention to participate in the 2026 contest on 30 October 2025. On 19 May 2026, the broadcaster made an open call for singers and songs that would close on 27 May; the day after it was set to close, the deadline for song submissions was extended until 10 June. Selected applicants were invited to perform two songs at an audition round on 1 June; they would be tested on their stage presence, naturalness of expressions, vocal capacity and complete artistic interpretations of compositions. The audition round featured nine artists and was aired on 16 June on MRT 1 and MRT 5, with Ana Stojanoska announced as the selected entrant during the broadcast and "Idnata jas", written by Ilcho Nechovski and Nikola Micevski, revealed as the selected entry in a press release. Stojanoska recorded the song between 4 and 5 July.

Key: Selected entrant

Audition round participants
Artist	Song 1	Song 2
Ana Stojanoska	"O, ezero moe" (О, езеро мое)	"Proud"
Anastasija Marinoska	"From the Start"	"Part of Your World"
Iris Dojčinovska	"Padam, padam…"	"Once Upon a December"
Iva Molovska	"Empire State of Mind"	"Listen"
Jana Dimitrovska	"Eve me pak" (Еве ме пак)	"Part of Your World"
Jovana Taseva	"I Have Nothing"	"Majka" (Мајка)
Kaja Dimitrova	"Voilà"	"Gabriela"
Marija Stojanovska	"Nemirna" (Немирна)	"Set Fire to the Rain"
Mihaela Purdeska	"Part of Your World"	"Damn Your Eyes"

== At Junior Eurovision ==
The Junior Eurovision Song Contest 2026 took place at the Malta Fairs & Conventions Centre in Ta' Qali, Malta on 24 October 2026.

On stage, Ana was joined by dancers Kalina, Kaja and Elena, with Ilija Kardakoski as the choreographer. Ana's outfit was be designed by Elena Luka.

In North Macedonia, the contest was broadcast on MRT 1, with Zorica Nikoloska and Vane Markoski serving as commentators.
