= Anxiety Point =

Cape in Alaska, the United States

Coordinates: 70°18′55″N 147°57′25″W

Anxiety Point is a cape in North Slope Borough, Alaska, in the United States.

Anxiety Point was so named in 1826 from the anxiety explorer John Franklin and his team experienced when attempting to reach the cape from sea in adverse weather conditions.
