= Lou Deleuze =

French child actress and singer (born 2014)

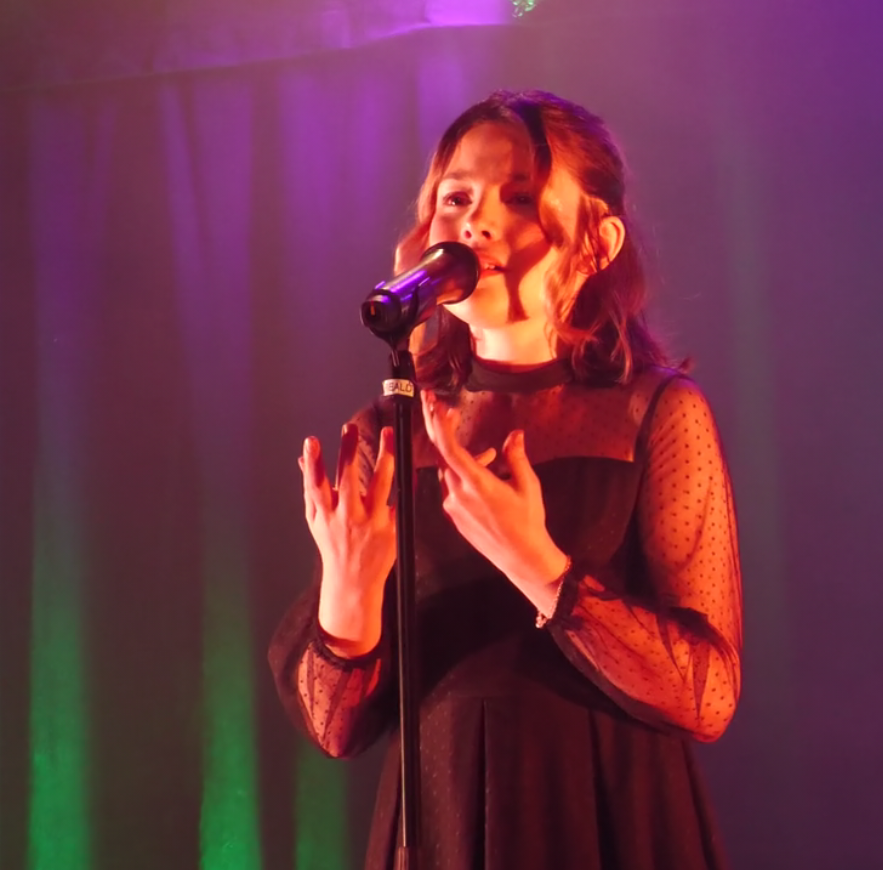
- Deleuze in 2026

Background information
- Born: 23 March 2014 (age 12); Île-de-France, France
- Genre: French pop
- Occupations: Actress; singer
- Years active: 2022–present

YouTube information
- Channel: Lou Deleuze
- Years active: 2023–present
- Genre: Music
- Subscribers: 21.9 thousand
- Views: ~4.9 million
- Last updated: 2nd November 2026

Lou Deleuze (born 23 March 2014) is a French child actress and singer. She represented France in the Junior Eurovision Song Contest 2025 with the song "Ce monde" and won with 248 points, the second-highest score in the history of the contest behind that of the 2019 Polish entry.

== Biography ==
=== Early life ===
Deleuze was born in Île-de-France on 23 March 2014. Her father was a luthier.

=== 2022–2025: Debut in the film industry, Junior Eurovision Song Contest, and local activity ===
The artist began her acting career at the age of seven in the 2022 film Le Parfum vert.

In 2024, Deleuze auditioned to represent France in the Junior Eurovision Song Contest 2024 in Madrid, Spain, but was not selected. Later that year, she competed in the nineteenth season of La France a un incroyable talent.

On 29 September 2025, the singer was announced as the French artist for the Junior Eurovision Song Contest 2025 in Tbilisi, Georgia, with the song "Ce monde", written by John Claes, Jonathan Thyssens, and Linh. The entry was released on the same day.

She eventually won the contest in Tbilisi on 13 December.

== Discography ==
=== Singles ===
Title	Year	Album or EP	Length	Ref.
"Papaoutai" (Stromae cover)	2023	Non-album singles	2:10	
"Désenchantée" (Mylène Farmer cover)	2023	Non-album singles	4:40	
"Donne-moi ton amour"	2024	Non-album singles	3:36	
"Jeux d'enfants"	2024	Non-album singles	2:39	
"Allo la Terre"	2024	Non-album singles	3:26	
"Rêver" (Mylène Farmer cover)	2024	Non-album singles	1:59	
"Ne les écoute pas"	2025	Non-album singles	2:57	
"Ce monde"	2025	Non-album singles	2:45	
"Le cri"	2026	Non-album singles	3:08	

== Filmography ==
Key
†	Denotes films that have not yet been released

=== Film ===
List of Lou Deleuze film credits
Year	Title	Role	Notes	Ref.
2022	Le Parfum vert	The little girl on the train		
2022	Poupée	Lola	Short film	
2022	Une nuit		Short film	
2023	Les Dents du bonheur	Madeleine	Short film	
2024	Maldoror	Patricia		
2024	Louna	Louna	Short film	
2025	Le Rendez-vous de l'été	Alma		
	Happy Deal †	TBA	Filming	

=== Television ===
List of Lou Deleuze film credits
Year	Title	Role	Notes	Ref.
2022	Paris Police 1905	The singing girl		
2025	Léo Mattéï, Brigade des mineurs	Mathilde Dumont		

== Videography ==
=== Music videos ===
Title	Year	Director(s)	Ref.
"Jeux d'enfants"	2024	—N/a	
"Ce monde"	2025	—N/a	

== Awards and nominations ==
Year	Award	Category	Nominated work	Result	Ref.
2023	Unifrance Short Film Awards	Best Actress	Les Dents du bonheur	Won	

Awards and achievements
Preceded by (Georgia (country)) Andria Putkaradze with "To My Mom"	Winner of the Junior Eurovision Song Contest; 2025	Succeeded by (Armenia) Naré with "Boo!"
Preceded by Titouan with "Comme ci comme ça"	France in the Junior Eurovision Song Contest; 2025	Succeeded by Alec with "Comment tu vas?"
