= Shauna Carrick =

Irish bookwriter and composer

Shauna Carrick is an Irish bookwriter, composer, lyricist and musical director. Carrick was shortlisted for Best Production at the Dublin Fringe Festival Awards 2023 for her show Shauna Carrick Wants A Dog by Aon Scéal Theatre.

Carrick was commissioned by British Youth Music Theatre in 2024 to write the songs for All Growed Up, based on the novel by Tony Macaulay and staged at Lyric Theatre, Belfast.
