= Ukraine in the Junior Eurovision Song Contest 2026 =

- Junior Eurovision Song Contest 2026
- Participating broadcaster: Public Broadcasting Company of Ukraine (Suspilne)
- Country: Ukraine
- Selection process: Natsvidbir na Dytiache Yevrobachennia – 2026
- Selection date: 26 September 2026

Competing entry
- Song: "Not a Lullaby"
- Artist: Erika Kolesnichenko
- Songwriters: Svitlana Tarabarova

Placement
- Final result: 9th, 106 points

Participation chronology

Ukraine was represented at the Junior Eurovision Song Contest 2026 with the song "Not a Lullaby", written by Svitlana Tarabarova and performed by Erika Kolesnichenko. The Ukrainian participating broadcaster, Suspilne, organised the national final Natsvidbir na Dytiache Yevrobachennia – 2026 in order to select its entry for the contest.

== Background ==
Prior to the 2026 contest, Ukraine had participated in the contest twenty times since its first entry in the 2006 contest. Since then, the country has won the contest on one occasion in 2012 with the song "Nebo" performed by Anastasiya Petryk. The nation originally opted not to take part in the contest in 2018 (due to financial and structural difficulties), but would later be added to the list of participating countries. In 2025, Sofiia Nersesian competed for Ukraine with the song "Motanka", which ended up in 2nd place out of 18 entries with 177 points.

== Before Junior Eurovision ==
=== Natsvidbir na Dytiache Yevrobachennia – 2026 ===
Natsvidbir na Dytiache Yevrobachennia – 2026 was the national final format developed by Suspilne in order to select its entry for the Junior Eurovision Song Contest 2026. The competition consisted of a final to be held on 26 September 2026 hosted by Anna Tulieva, Timur Miroshnychenko and Anastasiia Dymyd (who represented Ukraine in the 2023 contest). The show was broadcast on Suspilne Kultura, as well as on Suspilne's online platforms.

==== Format ====
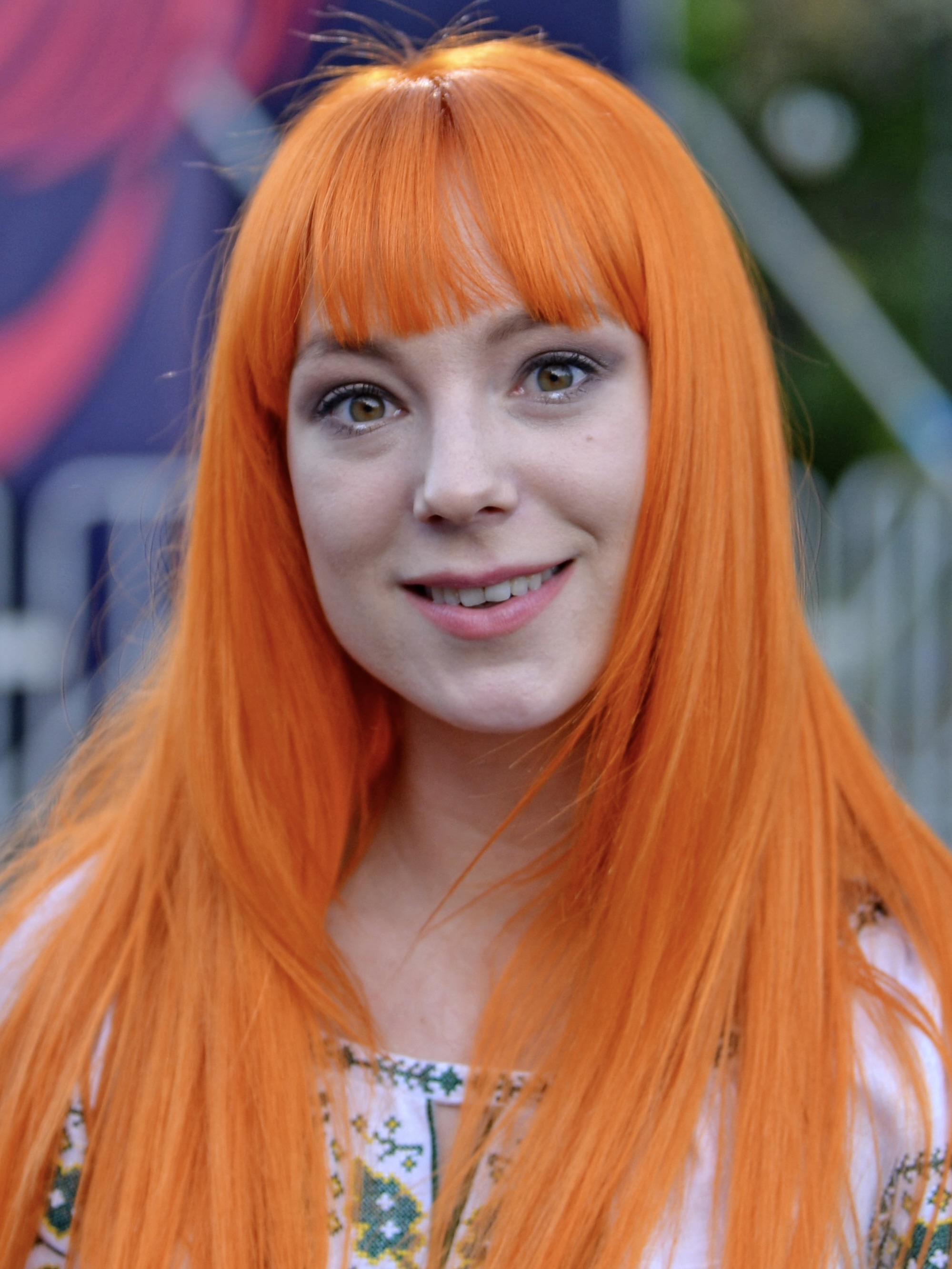
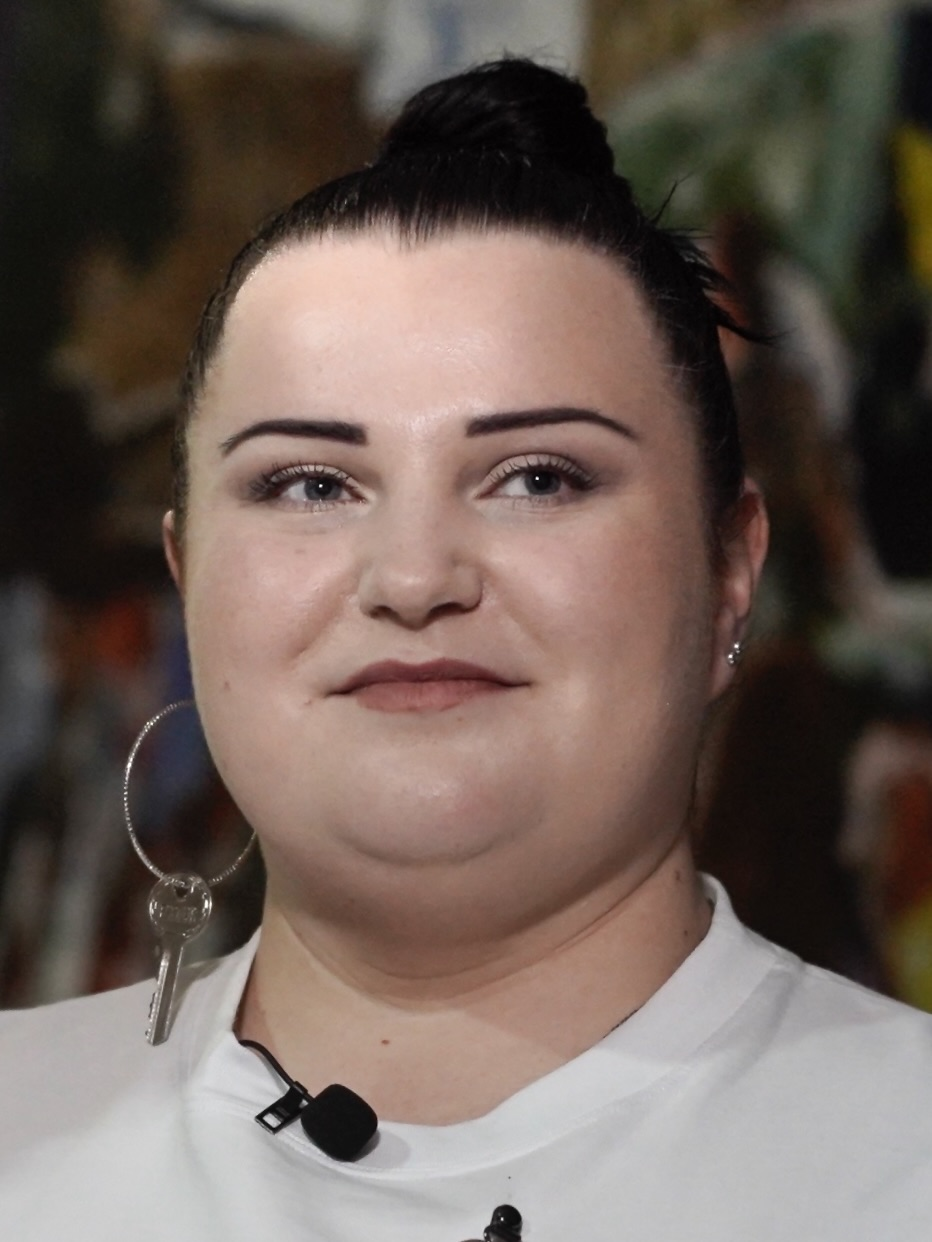
Svitlana Tarabarova, music producer of Natsvidbir na Dytiache Yevrobachennia – 2026 and songwriter for the finalist entries together with Alyona Alyona

The selection of the competing entries for the national final will take place over three stages. In the first stage, artists could apply for the competition through an online submission form. For the fourth year in a row, Svitlana Tarabarova is the music producer of the event, who is in charge of reviewing the received submissions and selecting a longlist of 15 participants, announced on 24 July 2026. In the second stage, longlisted artists attended live auditions, which were held in a public format for the first time on 26 July at the Respublika Park mall in Kyiv. They were assessed by a three-member expert council consisting of music producer Svitlana Tarabarova, Alyona Alyona (who represented Ukraine in the Eurovision Song Contest 2024 with Jerry Heil), and singer Mélovin (who represented Ukraine in the Eurovision Song Contest 2018). From these auditions, ten artists were chosen to advance to the "Star School" stage.

The process of narrowing the ten "Star School" participants down to six finalists was documented in the show Shchodennyky Dytiachoho Yevrobachennia ("Junior Eurovision diaries"), directed by singer and director Vlad Sheriff. During the first two episodes, one artist was eliminated per broadcast. In the third episode, two artists were eliminated. The remaining six finalists were then randomly assigned to either Svitlana Tarabarova or Alyona Alyona, who were responsible for writing original songs for the televised pre-selection. Throughout the show, various guest mentors were invited to train the artists in vocal lessons, stage workshops, choreography classes and sessions with psychologists to help them manage performance anxiety. At the end of each episode, these mentors helped select which artists would advance to the next round. The guest mentors included actor Pavlo Tekuchev, singer Tayanna, choreographer Ivan Yurkiv, singer Laud, and stage directors Lesia Podolianko and Illia Osiadlyi.

The third stage consists of Suspilne assigning specially-made songs written by Tarabarova and Alyona Alyona; no original song submitted by a competing artist made the final.

The six selected acts will take part in a final on 26 September 2026, where the winner will be determined by a 50/50 combination of jury and public votes – the latter being cast through the Diia application over two phases of voting.

==== Competing entries ====
The submission process for interested artists aged between nine and fourteen was open between 16 June and 8 July 2026. All submissions required participants to enter covers of two songs and a separate introduction video; however, artists are also allowed to submit original songs for consideration. Precedence was not given to complete submissions, with Suspilne also reserving the right to replace a song submitted by an eventual finalist with a new entry of its choice if such a case occurs. At the closing of the submission process, 642 applications had been received, with roughly 47 of them also including an original song.

Longlisted artists
Artist	Top 10	Top 8	Top 6	Result
Anastasiia Poshedina	Yes			Finalist
Dmytro Karabet	Yes			Finalist
Erika Kolesnichenko	Yes			Finalist
Karina Shtefanesa	Yes	No	—N/a	Eliminated
Kateryna Vatan	No	—N/a		Eliminated
Mariia Blyzniuk	No	—N/a		Eliminated
Marko Serdynskyi	Yes			Finalist
Oliviia Tkachyk	Yes		No	Eliminated
Roman Doroshenko	Yes			Finalist
Sofiia Dupelych	Yes		No	Eliminated
Sofiia Nazarenko	No	—N/a		Eliminated
Sofiia and Veronika Vozniak	No	—N/a		Eliminated
Vladyslav Danilevskyi	No	—N/a		Eliminated
Vyhor	Yes	No	—N/a	Eliminated
Zlata Solonenko	Yes			Finalist

Natsvidbir na Dytiache Yevrobachennia – 2026 participating entries
Artist	Song	Songwriter(s)
Anastasiia Poshedina	"Kryla" (Крила)	Aliona Savranenko
Dmytro Karabet	"Mamo" (Мамо)	Svitlana Tarabarova
Erika Kolesnichenko	"Ne kolyskova" (Не колискова)	Svitlana Tarabarova
Marko Serdynskyi	"Hory" (Гори)	Aliona Savranenko
Roman Doroshenko	"Say Hello"	Svitlana Tarabarova
Zlata Solonenko	"Who Am I"	Aliona Savranenko; Veronika Kovalenko

==== Final ====
The final took place on 26 September 2026. The members of the jury were: Dmytro "Pianoboy" Shurov (singer and pianist) and Skylerr (singer). (Note: Radio host Anna Sviridova was originally selected as the third member of the jury. However, due to health issues, she was unable to take part in the event.) In addition to the competing entries, the guest performers included Sofiia Nersesian – alongside the finalist and the choir Kryla Zbuku – with "Motanka", Tarabarova and Sofiia Nersesian with "Zapletu vinochok", Kazhanna with "Slozka", Alyona Alyona and Skylerr with "Lety" – alongside the children of the Dity heroiv Foundation – and Pianoboy with "Trymatys svoikh". 77,688 Ukrainians ultimately voted on the Diia app. Due to a tie-break, where the public vote prevailed, eleven-year-old singer Erika Kolesnichenko was declared the winner with the song "Ne kolyskova".

Final – 26 September 2026
R/O	Artist	Song	Jury	Public vote	Total	Place
1	Anastasiia Poshedina	"Kryla"	2	3	5	4
2	Roman Doroshenko	"Say Hello"	3	1	4	5
3	Erika Kolesnichenko	"Ne kolyskova"	5	6	11	1
4	Dmytro Karabet	"Mamo"	1	2	3	6
5	Marko Serdynskyi	"Hory"	4	4	8	3
6	Zlata Solonenko	"Who Am I"	6	5	11	2

=== Preparation ===
On 29 September 2026, it was revealed that the title of Kolesnichenko's entry would be changed from "Ne kolyskova" to "Not a Lullaby", alongside a revamp of the song.

== At Junior Eurovision ==
The Junior Eurovision Song Contest 2026 took place at the Malta Fairs & Conventions Centre in Ta' Qali, Malta on the 24th of October 2026.

=== Performance ===
Her performance of "Not a Lullaby" was directed by Lesya Podolyanko and Ilya Osyadly. Kolesnichenko was joined on stage by four dancers, all wearing giant, lime-green fringed cacti costumes, that remind of the desertic scene seen in the background. She, instead, was wearing a glittery hot pink satin outfit with puff sleeves and retro flared trousers. The costume was designed by Oleksandr Grekov.

=== Voting ===
==== Detailed voting results ====
The following members comprised the Ukrainian jury:

- Pylp Kolyadenko
- Kazhanna
- Anna Bondarenko

According to the contest rules, the two child jurors who also formed part of the Ukrainian jury cannot be named.
