= Ce monde =

2025 single by Lou Deleuze

Single by Lou Deleuze
- Language: French
- Released: 29 September 2025
- Length: 2:46
- Songwriters: John Claes, Jonathan Thyssens, Pauline Thisse
- Composer: Pauline Thisse

Music video
- "Ce monde" on YouTube

Junior Eurovision Song Contest 2025 entry
- Country: France
- Artist: Lou Deleuze
- Language: French

Finals performance
- Final result: 1st
- Final points: 248

Entry chronology
- ◄ "Comme ci, comme ça" (2024)
- "Comment tu vas?" (2026) ►

"Ce monde" (lit. 'This world') is a song by French singer Lou Deleuze. It was released as a single on 29 September 2025.

It was France's winning entry for the Junior Eurovision Song Contest 2025 in Tbilisi, Georgia. Lou Deleuze, aged 11, won the competition with a total of 248 points, 71 points ahead of second-placed Ukraine (the largest point margin of win in contest history), earning France its fourth overall victory at the contest, to equal Georgia's record for most wins in contest history.

== Description ==
The lyrics indicate both the concerns and hopes of the younger generation.

== Junior Eurovision ==
=== Selection ===
France Télévisions selected Deleuze to represent France in the Junior Eurovision Song Contest 2025 in Tbilisi, Georgia. As part of the promotion of her participation in the contest, Deleuze was a guest on the French TV show Quelle époque ! on 15 November, broadcast on France 2.

=== Music video ===
The music video was released online on 22 October 2025.

=== Victory ===
The contest took place on 13 December 2025, at the Gymnastic Hall of Olympic City in Tbilisi, Georgia.

Deleuze won the competition, scoring 248 points, ahead of Ukraine with 177 and Georgia with 176 points. This was France's fourth overall victory in the contest.
