= Albania in the Junior Eurovision Song Contest 2026 =

- Junior Eurovision Song Contest 2026
- Participating broadcaster: Radio Televizioni Shqiptar (RTSH)
- Country: Albania
- Selection process: Festivali i 64-të Mbarëkombëtar i Këngës për Fëmijë
- Selection date: 1 June 2026

Competing entry
- Song: "Kërce me mua"
- Artist: Eslin Kurti
- Songwriters: Enis Mullaj; Eriona Rushiti

Placement
- Final result: 15th, 62 points

Participation chronology

Albania was represented at the Junior Eurovision Song Contest 2026 with the song "Kërce me mua", composed and produced by Enis Mullaj, lyrics by Eriona Rushiti, and performed by Eslin Kurti. The Albanian participating broadcaster, Radio Televizioni Shqiptar (RTSH), organised the national final Festivali i 64-të Mbarëkombëtar i Këngës për Fëmijë to select its entry for the contest.

== Background ==
Prior to the 2026 contest, Radio Televizioni Shqiptar (RTSH) had participated in the Junior Eurovision Song Contest representing Albania eleven times since its first entry in the 2012 contest. Albania has never won the contest, with their best result being in 2015, when Mishela Rapo represented the country with "Dambaje", placing 5th. The nation opted not to take part in the contest in 2013 and 2014, and in 2020 (due to the COVID-19 pandemic). In 2025, Kroni Pula competed for Albania with the song "Fruta perime", which ended up in 6th place with 145 points.

== Before Junior Eurovision ==
=== Festivali i 64-të Mbarëkombëtar i Këngës për Fëmijë ===
Festivali i 64-të Mbarëkombëtar i Këngës për Fëmijë was the 64th edition of Festivali i Këngës për Fëmijë organised by the Albanian broadcaster RTSH to select its entry. The participants were divided into two categories: young (ages 5 to 8) and junior (ages 9 to 14), all while being given the lyric sheets to specially-made songs written by well-known Albanian songwriters and recorded those assigned songs in the studio along with a children's choir, who accompanied the competing performances. They competed in different shows to reach the final. The first two nights were on 30 and 31 May and the final aired on 1 June 2026. All three shows were held inside the Migjeni Theatre in Shkodër at 19:00 CET, hosted by Isli Islami and Kroni Pula and broadcast on RTSH 1, RTSH Muzikë and Radio Tirana 1.

Participants: Junior artists
| Artist | Song | Songwriter(s) |
|---|---|---|
| Aislin & Mailis Kavaja | "Simpa" (Note: Originally announced as "Stilin kështu e kam".) | Naim Krasniqi |
| Ameis Demiraj | "Fjala" | Enis Mullaj |
| Amina Zegullaj | "Vetëm" | Endri Muçaj; Eriona Rushiti |
| Anila Mahmudi | "Do mësoj" | Gent Myftaraj |
| Aria Kolaveri | "Dua ta marr globin në krahë" | Gjergj Leka; Rozina Sterkaj |
| Dea Laja | "Miqësia jonë është e rrallë" | Endrit Shani |
| Eden Vrioni | "Rumtata" | Adrian Hila; Egzona Ademi |
| Emili Dervishi | "Hello" | Enis Mullaj; Eriona Rushiti |
| Eslin Kurti | "Kërce me mua" | Eriona Rushiti; Rei Bezhani |
| Etnik Balidemaj | "Etnik" | Korab Shaqiri |
| Grupi Pentagram | "Jug-Veri" | Denis Taraj |
| Jasemin Çaku | "Prit" | Blerti Leci |
| Kenza Pilana | "Do gjej zërin tim" | Jehona Lumi; Rinor Ukimeri |
| Kleon Prenga | "Boom-boom" | Egzona Ademi |
| Laura Spahiu | "Nëse beson" | Eliza Qafoku; Klodian Qafoku |
| Marvin Myshketa | "7 shanse" | Ori Kuçi |
| Mejvis Malecaj | "Varka që nuk ndalet kurrë" | Suela Tukaj |
| Rozafa Maka and Prishila Puka | "Mirëmëngjes" | Sokol Marsi |
| Xhanali Sharra | "Jemi një" | Ana Kaçinari; Gjergj Kaçinari |

Participants: Young artists
| Artist | Song | Songwriter(s) |
|---|---|---|
| Airis Shehu | "Shopping me shoqet" | Jetmir Mehmedaj; Suela Tukaj |
| Ajri Drishti | "Nuk kam ku luj'" | Ismet Drishti |
| Alisa and Lisara Dashi | "Melodia jonë" | Enejda Kruja; Ilir Zoga |
| Amla Veizaj | "Të gjithë në punë" | Edmond Veizaj; Tasim Gjokutaj |
| Eli Ahmetaj | "Jam si lule" | Kolë Susaj; Ramazan Çeka |
| Klea Shkreli | "Kush e shkroi" | Xhahid Bushati; Zef Çoba |
| Maria Kalaja | "Çika-çika, çikalore" | Aulon Kalaja; Ylli Kalaja |
| Marlin Janko | "Sjell dritë" | Isea Çili; Sajmir Çili |
| Mia and Buna Shkenza | "Urra-urra" | Frederik Ndoci |
| Serena Turhani | "Aventura" | Alfred Kaçinari; Ana Kaçinari |
| Sofi Tupi | "Jo mos imito" | Edmond Rrapi; Leidi Shqiponja |

==== Shows ====
The first two shows of the competition took place on 30 and 31 May 2026 in the Migjeni Theatre in Shkodër at 19:00 CET. The first semi-final with a live children's choir performing "Vera". Albanian singer Albana Gojçaj performed as special guest in the first show. More Albanian recording artists, including Kroni Pula and Irma Libohova with "Gabimi i Mirelës", as well as Anjeza Marku and her niece Roksana with "Hënëzo", performed in the second night.

Night 1 – 30 May 2026
| R/O | Artist | Song | Category |
|---|---|---|---|
| 1 | Kleon Prenga | "Boom-boom" | Junior |
| 2 | Marlin Janko | "Sjell dritë" | Young |
| 3 | Anila Mahmudi | "Do mësoj" | Junior |
| 4 | Ameis Demiraj | "Fjala" | Junior |
| 5 | Ajri Drishti | "Nuk kam ku luj'" | Young |
| 6 | Dea Laja | "Miqësia jonë është e rrallë" | Junior |
| 7 | Mia and Buna Shkenza | "Urra-urra" | Young |
| 8 | Mejvis Malecaj | "Varka që nuk ndalet kurrë" | Junior |
| 9 | Serena Turhani | "Aventura" | Young |
| 10 | Jasemin Çaku | "Prit" | Junior |
| 11 | Sofi Tupi | "Jo mos imito" | Young |
| 12 | Rozafa Maka and Prishila Puka | "Mirëmëngjes" | Junior |
| 13 | Eli Ahmetaj | "Jam si lule" | Young |
| 14 | Eslin Kurti | "Kërce me mua" | Junior |
| 15 | Etnik Balidemaj | "Etnik" | Junior |

Night 2 – 31 May 2026
| R/O | Artist | Song | Category |
|---|---|---|---|
| 1 | Grupi Pentagram | "Jug-Veri" | Junior |
| 2 | Amla Veizaj | "Të gjithë në punë" | Young |
| 3 | Laura Spahiu | "Nëse beson" | Junior |
| 4 | Amina Zegullaj | "Vetëm" | Junior |
| 5 | Xhanali Sharra | "Jemi një" | Junior |
| 6 | Eden Vrioni | "Rumtata" | Junior |
| 7 | Aislin and Mailis Kavaja | "Simpa" | Junior |
| 8 | Maria Kalaja | "Çika-çika, çikalore" | Young |
| 9 | Aria Kolaveri | "Dua ta marr globin në krahë" | Junior |
| 10 | Airis Shehu | "Shopping me shoqet" | Young |
| 11 | Kenza Pilana | "Do gjej zërin tim" | Junior |
| 12 | Klea Shkreli | "Kush e shkroi" | Young |
| 13 | Emili Dervishi | "Hello" | Junior |
| 14 | Alisa and Lisara Dashi | "Melodia jonë" | Young |
| 15 | Marvin Myshketa | "7 shanse" | Junior |

==== Final ====
The final of the competition took place on 1 June 2026. The winner of the junior category was given the right to represent the country at the 2026 contest. A children's choir opened the show with "Vera" as they did on the first night of Festivali i 64-të Mbarëkombëtar i Këngës për Fëmijë. Kroni Pula also performed "Fruta perime" as an interval act. The children's jury consisted of Ambra Marku, Amina Hasi, Amla Demushi, Annabel Çoba, Arben Gjeçaj, Arrita Marku, David Kerri, Dean Hoxhaj, Devis Shimaj, Ea Zoga, Eden Dani, Eliza Bushgjokaj, Ensara Sulaj, Gabriel Goraj, Gabriel Shabaj, Ilenia Llanaj, Isra Elmazi, Isra Mashi, Keisi Muça, Kejsi Sinani, Luar Kadija, Marin Kerri, Matilda Simoni, Melsi Puka, Natali Lalaj, Nergis Nikprelaj, Nikol Çabeli, Nivis Sulishti, Rea Lila, Rejna Koçi, Stela Toma, Viola Gjyzeli.

Key: Winner Second place Third place

Final – 1 June 2026
| R/O | Artist | Song | Category | Place |
|---|---|---|---|---|
| 1 | Etnik Balidemaj | "Etnik" | Junior | —N/a |
| 2 | Alisa and Lisara Dashi | "Melodia jonë" | Young | —N/a |
| 3 | Aria Kolaveri | "Dua marr globin në krahë" | Junior | 2 |
| 4 | Eli Ahmetaj | "Jam si lule" | Young | —N/a |
| 5 | Xhanali Sharra | "Jemi një" | Junior | —N/a |
| 6 | Marvin Myshketa | "7 shanse" | Junior | —N/a |
| 7 | Aislin and Mailis Kavaja | "Simpa" | Junior | —N/a |
| 8 | Grupi Pentagram | "Jug-Veri" | Junior | —N/a |
| 9 | Marlin Janko | "Sjell dritë" | Young | —N/a |
| 10 | Kleon Prenga | "Boom-boom" | Junior | —N/a |
| 11 | Eden Vrioni | "Rumtata" | Junior | —N/a |
| 12 | Laura Spahiu | "Nëse beson" | Junior | 3 |
| 13 | Ameis Demiraj | "Fjala" | Junior | —N/a |
| 14 | Mia and Buna Shkenza | "Urra-urra" | Young | —N/a |
| 15 | Kenza Pilana | "Do gjej zërin tim" | Junior | —N/a |
| 16 | Serena Turhani | "Aventura" | Young | —N/a |
| 17 | Amla Veizaj | "Të gjithë në punë" | Young | —N/a |
| 18 | Emili Dervishi | "Hello" | Junior | —N/a |
| 19 | Rozafa Maka and Prishila Puka | "Mirëmëngjes" | Junior | —N/a |
| 20 | Jasemin Çaku | "Prit" | Junior | —N/a |
| 21 | Mejvis Malecaj | "Varka që nuk ndalet kurrë" | Junior | —N/a |
| 22 | Amina Zegullaj | "Vetëm" | Junior | —N/a |
| 23 | Airis Shehu | "Shopping me shoqet" | Young | —N/a |
| 24 | Maria Kalaja | "Çika-çika, çikalore" | Young | 2 |
| 25 | Eslin Kurti | "Kërce me mua" | Junior | 1 |
| 26 | Sofi Tupi | "Jo mos imito" | Young | —N/a |
| 27 | Ajri Drishti | "Nuk kam ku luj'" | Young | 1 |
| 28 | Anila Mahmudi | "Do mësoj" | Junior | —N/a |
| 29 | Dea Laja | "Miqësia jonë është e rrallë" | Junior | —N/a |
| 30 | Klea Shkreli | "Kush e shkroi" | Young | 3 |

==== Controversy ====
To select its entry the Albanian broadcaster has used the national final method of Junior Fest between 2017 and 2024. This was then replaced briefly by Festivali i 63-të Mbarëkombëtar i Këngës për Fëmijë in 2025. Originally it was announced that they would use Festivali i 64-të Mbarëkombëtar i Këngës për Fëmijë would be used to select their entry. The Albanian Broadcaster RTSH later announced that Junior Fest would be used to select their entry.

Following the announcement of Junior Fest 2026 as the selection method, complaints emerged in Albania with reports that the parents of some participants in Festivali i 64-të Mbarëkombëtar i Këngës për Fëmijë considered legal action against RTSH. Following the criticism faced by RTSH, they reached an agreement with the Municipality of Shkodra to use Festivali Mbarëkombëtar i Këngës për Fëmijë to select their entry for the contest.

== At Junior Eurovision ==
Albania performed in the 14th slot in the running order. The contest took place on the 24th of October.

The contest was broadcast in Albania on RTSH 1, RTSH Muzikë, Radio Tirana 1 with commentary provided by Andri Xhahu. Viola Gjyzeli was their spokesperson who revealed their jury's votes.

=== Performance ===
For her performance, Eslin was joined on stage by three dancers and one singer. Jaesmin Caku, Ameis Demiraj and two others featured in her performance. Her performance incorporated elements of the existing stage design using the Maltese streetscape as well as park and a sci-fi scene.

Kurti's performance was designed by a team formed of an Italian Artistic Director and Albanians. The unnamed Artistic Director has previously worked on performances at the Sanremo Music Festival, as well as with Laura Pausini on her latest tour, Amici and on X Factor. The outfits that Kurti and her dancers wore had been designed by Albanian designer Miranda Dupi.

=== Voting ===
The same voting system that was introduced in the 2017 edition was used, where the results were determined by 50% online voting and 50% jury voting. Every participating broadcaster assembled a national jury that consisted of three music industry professionals and two children aged between 10 and 15 who were citizens of the country they represented. The rankings of those jurors were combined to make an overall top ten.

The online voting consisted of two phases. The first phase of the online voting began on 23 October 2026 when a recap of all the rehearsal performances was shown on the contest's website Junioreurovision.tv before the viewers could vote. After this, voters also had the option to watch longer one-minute clips from each participant's rehearsal. This first round of voting ended on 24 October at 20:59 CEST. The second phase of the online voting took place during the live show and began right after the last performance and was open for 15 minutes. International viewers were able to vote for three songs. They were also able to vote for their own country's song. These votes were then turned into points which were determined by the percentage of votes received. For example, if a song received 10% of the votes, it received 10% of the available points.
