= Malta in the Junior Eurovision Song Contest 2026 =

- Junior Eurovision Song Contest 2026
- Participating broadcaster: Public Broadcasting Services (PBS)
- Country: Malta
- Selection process: The Voice Kids 3
- Selection date: 19 September 2026

Competing entry
- Song: "Blue Bird"
- Artist: Beppe
- Songwriters: Beppe Caruana; Matthew Caruana; Matthew James Borg; Matthew Mercieca

Placement
- Final result: 7th, 136 points

Participation chronology

Malta is set to be represented at the Junior Eurovision Song Contest 2026 with the song "Blue Bird", written by Beppe Caruana, Matthew Caruana, Matthew James Borg and Matthew Mercieca, and performed by Beppe himself. The Maltese participating broadcaster, Public Broadcasting Services (PBS), organised The Voice Kids 3 in order to select its entry for the contest. In addition, PBS is also the host broadcaster and will stage the event at the Malta Fairs & Conventions Centre in Ta' Qali.

== Background ==
Prior to the 2026 contest, Malta had participated in the contest twenty-one times since its first entry in the inaugural 2003 contest. Since then, Malta has won the contest on two occasions: in 2013 with "The Start" performed by Gaia Cauchi, and in 2015 with "Not My Soul" performed by Destiny Chukunyere. The nation opted not to take part in the contest in 2011 and 2012. In 2025, Eliza Borg competed for Malta with the song "I Believe", which placed 11th place, scoring 92 points.

After the French broadcaster declined the hosting of the 2026 contest, Malta was chosen to host in Malta Fairs & Conventions Centre in Ta' Qali, Attard, marking the third time that the contest will be held in Malta and the first time the contest will be held in October.

== Before Junior Eurovision ==
=== The Voice Kids 3 ===
On 25 May 2026, PBS announced that it would use the talent show The Voice Kids, hosted by Maxine Pace, to select its entry for the second year in the row. and opened the submission process for interested artists aged between eight and fourteen. Aleandro Spiteri Monsigneur, Destiny Chukunyere and Gaia Cauchi served as the coaches; the latter two won the Junior Eurovision Song Contest in 2013 and 2015, respectively, with Chukunyere as the only coach returning from the previous edition.

==== Final ====
The final took place on 19 September 2025. The winner was selected through two rounds of voting. In the first round of voting, three artists were selected to proceed to the second round by their respective coaches, i.e. one from each team. In the second round, a jury selected eleven-year-old Beppe Caruana of team Gaia as the winner.

Key: Winner

Final – Second round – 19 September 2026
Artist	Draw	Song (Duet with coach)	Draw	Song
Maya Galea	1	"Somewhere Only We Know" (with Aleandro Spiteri Monsigneur)	4	"I Don't Want to Miss a Thing"
Beppe Caruana	2	"Mad World" (with Gaia Cauchi)	5	"Beautiful Things"
Zeah Aquilina	3	"The Climb" (with Destiny Chukunyere)	6	"I Wanna Dance with Somebody (Who Loves Me)"
