= Ireland in the Junior Eurovision Song Contest 2026 =

- Junior Eurovision Song Contest 2026
- Participating broadcaster: TG4
- Country: Ireland
- Selection process: Artist: Junior Eurovision Éire 2026; Song: Internal selection
- Selection date: 4 October 2026

Competing entry
- Song: "Níos láidre"
- Artist: Caleb Kirwan and Naomi Gribben
- Songwriters: Ben Pyne; Larissa Tormey; Remy Borsboom; Shauna Carrick

Placement
- Final result: 14th, 64 points

Participation chronology

Ireland was represented at the Junior Eurovision Song Contest 2026 with the song "Níos láidre", written by Ben Pyne, Larissa Tormey, Remy Borsboom and Shauna Carrick, and performed by Caleb Kirwan and Naomi Gribben. The Irish participating broadcaster, TG4, selected Kirwan and Gribben as their representatives through the national final Junior Eurovision Éire 2026, while the song "Níos láidre" was internally selected.

== Background ==
Prior to the 2026 contest, TG4 had participated in the Junior Eurovision Song Contest representing Ireland ten times since its debut in 2015; TG4 originally intended to make its debut a year earlier, but required funding from the Broadcasting Authority of Ireland (BAI), which was rejected. Ireland first entered the top ten in 2016, with "Bríce ar bhríce" by Zena Donnelly ending up in 10th place out of 17 entries with 122 points; this would remain as Ireland's only top ten entry and its best result until 2022, when the song "Solas" by Sophie Lennon finished 4th with 150 points. In 2025, "Rúin" by Lottie O'Driscoll Murray ended up in 18th (last) place with 44 points; this marked the second last place result for Ireland.

Unlike in the Eurovision Song Contest, where Raidió Teilifís Éireann (RTÉ) is the broadcaster representing Ireland, the Irish-language broadcaster TG4, also a full member of the European Broadcasting Union (EBU), is the Irish participating broadcaster in the Junior Eurovision Song Contest.

== Before Junior Eurovision ==
=== Junior Eurovision Éire 2026 ===
TG4 confirmed its intention to participate in the 2026 contest on 30 January 2026, also revealing that it would once again use the national selection format Junior Eurovision Éire, co-produced with Adare Productions, to select its artist, and opened the submission process for interested artists aged between nine and fourteen. Auditions for the show took place in Dublin, Cork and Athlone, while the selection process was filmed in the Irish capital during the summer of 2026.

Further details of the competition were announced on 25 August 2026. Louise Cantillon returned to host the show for the sixth time in a row. Niamh Ní Chróinín and Hugh Carr both returned as permanent judges.

==== Participants ====
The ten participants competing in the 2026 edition were revealed at the end of the first show:

- Freya Connolly
- Libby Fay
- Isa-Mae Lyle
- Naomi Gribben
- Caleb Kirwan
- Dualta Browne
- Rí-Rá
- Alexa Ralph
- Maedbh Cash
- Sophie Richmond

==== Jury members ====
As in previous editions, the results of the live shows were decided by an in-studio jury of two permanent members and revolving guest judges. The permanent judges are:

- Niamh Ní Chróinín – Radio presenter, manager of Irish-language youth radio station Raidió Rí-Rá
- Hugh Carr – Radio presenter on RTÉ 2fm

Guest judges
Artist	ESC Year(s)	Song(s)	Place (SF)	Points (SF)	Place (Final)	Points (Final)
Linda Martin	1984	"Terminal 3"	No semi-finals		2	137
Linda Martin	1992	"Why Me?"	No semi-finals		1	155
Niamh Kavanagh	1993	"In Your Eyes"	No semi-finals		1	187
Niamh Kavanagh	2010	"It's for You"	9	67	23	25
Mickey Joe Harte	2003	"We've Got the World"	No semi-finals		11	53
Zena Donelly	2016 (Note: Competed in the junior contest.)	"Bríce ar Bhríce"	No semi-finals		10	122

==== First round ====
The second show was broadcast on 20 September 2026, with Niamh Kavanagh as the guest judge. As happened during the previous edition, all ten finalists performed in the first show with two being eliminated from the competition. The show consisted of all ten artists performing Irish-language covers of popular songs. Freya Connolly and Maedbh Cash did not advance, while the remaining eight contestants progressed to the next round.

Show 2 – 20 September 2026
R/O	Artist	Song (Original artists)	Result
1	Dualta Browne	"This Is the Life" (Amy Macdonald)	Advanced
2	Alexa Ralph	"Drivers License" (Olivia Rodrigo)	Advanced
3	Caleb Kirwan	"Beautiful Things" (Benson Boone)	Advanced
4	Libby Fay	"New York, New York" (Liza Minnelli)	Advanced
5	Freya Connolly	"Only Love Can Hurt Like This" (Paloma Faith)	Eliminated
6	Naomi Gribben	"And I Am Telling You I'm Not Going" (Jennifer Holliday)	Advanced
7	Rí-Rá	"Friday I'm in Love" (The Cure)	Advanced
8	Isa-Mae Lyle	"Travelin' Soldier" (Dixie Chicks)	Advanced
9	Sophie Richmond	"Zombie" (The Cranberries)	Advanced
10	Maedbh Cash	"Good as Hell" (Lizzo)	Eliminated

==== Second round ====
The third show was broadcast on 24 September 2026, with Mickey Joe Harte as the guest judge. The remaining eight artists performed with another two being eliminated from the competition. The show consisted of all eight artists performing Irish-language covers of popular songs. Alexa Ralph and Isa-Mae Lyle did not advance to the next round, while the remaining six contestants progressed to the semi-final.

Show 3 – 24 September 2026
R/O	Artist	Song (Original artists)	Result
1	Naomi Gribben	"Holding Out for a Hero" (Bonnie Tyler)	Advanced
2	Caleb Kirwan	"I Will Always Love You" (Whitney Houston)	Advanced
3	Libby Fay	"Relight My Fire" (Dan Hartman)	Advanced
4	Dualta Browne	"Linger" (The Cranberries)	Advanced
5	Sophie Richmond	"Radioactive" (Imagine Dragons)	Advanced
6	Alexa Ralph	"Lullaby" (The Cure)	Eliminated
7	Isa-Mae Lyle	"When the Party's Over" (Billie Eilish)	Wildcard (Note: Isa-Mae Lyle, who was originally eliminated in the second round, was awarded a wildcard by the judges, allowing her to compete in the next round.)
8	Rí-Rá	"Austin" (Blake Shelton)	Advanced

==== Semi-final ====
The fourth show was broadcast on 27 September 2026, with Zena Donnelly as the guest judge. The remaining seven artists performed with four contestants being eliminated from the competition. The show consisted of all seven artists performing Irish-language covers of popular songs. Sophie Richmond, Libby Fay, Dualta Browne and Rí-Rá did not advance, while the final three contestants qualified for the final.

Show 4 – 27 September 2026
R/O	Artist	Song (Original artists)	Result
1	Caleb Kirwan	"Hello" (Adele)	Advanced
2	Sophie Richmond	"The Man Who Can't Be Moved" (The Script)	Eliminated
3	Libby Fay	"Castles" (Freya Ridings)	Eliminated
4	Isa-Mae Lyle	"Stay" (Rihanna feat. Mikky Ekko)	Advanced
5	Naomi Gribben	"Ordinary" (Alex Warren)	Advanced
6	Dualta Browne	"What Makes You Beautiful" (One Direction)	Eliminated
7	Rí-Rá	"Valerie" (Mark Ronson feat. Amy Winehouse)	Eliminated

==== Final ====
The fifth and final show will take place on 4 October 2026, with Linda Martin as the guest judge. First, the remaining three finalists will perform an Irish-language cover of a popular song and a cover of a famous Eurovision song. After revealing Caleb Kirwan and Naomi Gribben as the top 2, they will perform an Irish-language cover from the previous weeks. Caleb Kirwan and Naomi Gribben were subsequently announced as joint winners – after the judges failed to select an individual one – earning the right to represent Ireland at the Junior Eurovision Song Contest 2026 in Ta' Qali.

Show 5 – 4 October 2026
Artist	R/O	Song	R/O	Song (Eurovision cover)	Result
Caleb Kirwan	1	"Halo" (Beyoncé)	4	"Tattoo" (Loreen) - Won for Sweden in 2023	Advanced
Naomi Gribben	2	"If I Could Turn Back Time" (Cher)	5	"Why Me?" (Linda Martin) - Won for Ireland in 1992	Advanced
Isa-Mae Lyle	3	"Back to Black" (Amy Winehouse)	6	"Arcade" (Duncan Laurence) - Won for the Netherlands in 2019	Eliminated

Artist	Song (Song from the series)	N. Ní Chróinín	H. Carr	L. Martin	Result
Caleb Kirwan	"I Will Always Love You" (Whitney Houston)	X	X	X	1
Naomi Gribben	"And I Am Telling You I'm Not Going" (Jennifer Holliday)	X	X	X	1

== At Eurovision ==
The contest attracted 21.400 viewers and a 2,33% share on TG4 in average, the highest average audience for the event since the 2021 contest.
