= Spain in the Junior Eurovision Song Contest 2026 =

- Junior Eurovision Song Contest 2026
- Participating broadcaster: Radiotelevisión Española (RTVE)
- Country: Spain
- Selection process: Internal selection
- Announcement date: Artist: 30 July 2026; Song: 28 September 2026

Competing entry
- Song: "Cuore bello (te quiero, te quiero"
- Artist: Lucas Paulano
- Songwriters: Blas Cantó; Carlos Almazán; Daniel Ángelo Ortega; Lucas Paulano

Placement
- Final result: 2nd, 184 points

Participation chronology

Spain was represented at the Junior Eurovision Song Contest 2026 with the song "Cuore bello (te quiero, te quiero)", written by Blas Cantó, Carlos Almazán, Daniel Ángelo Ortega and Lucas Paulano, and performed by Paulano himself. The Spanish participating broadcaster, Radiotelevisión Española (RTVE), internally selected its entry for the contest.

== Background ==
Prior to the 2026 contest, Televisión Española (TVE) until 2006, and Radiotelevisión Española (RTVE) since 2019, had participated in the Junior Eurovision Song Contest representing Spain eleven times. They came second on their debut appearance in 2003 with the song "Desde el cielo" performed by Sergio, and won the contest the following year with the song "Antes muerta que sencilla" performed by María Isabel. In 2025, "Érase una vez (Once Upon a Time)" performed by Gonzalo Pinillos placed fifth.

As part of its duties as participating broadcaster, RTVE organises the selection of its entry in the Junior Eurovision Song Contest and broadcasts the event in the country. The Spanish broadcaster has selected its entry for the contest through the national final Eurojunior between 2003 and 2006, and internal selections since its return in 2019. RTVE confirmed its intention to participate in the 2026 contest on 24 July 2026.

== Before Junior Eurovision ==
=== Internal selection ===
On 30 July 2026, RTVE announced they had carried out an internal selection for the Spanish entrant, revealing on the La 1 show El perro andaluz that Lucas Paulano (2025 winner of La Voz Kids) had been chosen; this marked the first time since 2021 that the broadcaster selected its representative without an open submission process. The song, titled "Cuore bello (te quiero, te quiero)" and written by Blas Cantó, Carlos Almazán, Daniel Ángelo and Paulano himself, was announced on 2 September. The song and its videoclip was presented at a press conference in Prado del Rey on the morning of 28 September where Paulano performed it live for the first time in public; with the videoclip being broadcast for the first time that same evening on La 1.

=== Promotion ===
The symphonic version of "Cuore bello (te quiero, te quiero)", performed by Paulano along with the RTVE Symphony Orchestra conducted by Miguel Guerra at the Teatro Monumental in Madrid, was released on 9 October.

== At Junior Eurovision ==
The Junior Eurovision Song Contest 2026 took place at the Malta Fairs & Conventions Centre in Ta' Qali, Malta on 24 October 2026. In Spain, the event was broadcast on La 1, as well as online via RTVE Play, with commentary by Julia Varela and Tony Aguilar. It will be also broadcast abroad on TVE Internacional. The contest attracted 1.212.000 viewers and a 12,1% share on La 1 in average, being the highest figure since the 2019 contest.

=== Performance ===
Lucas wore a light blue suit and performed within a circular structure composed of 523 light bulbs, which evolves in rhythm with the music.

Paulano's performance of "Cuore bello (te quiero, te quiero)" at the contest was staged by Javier Pageo, who was creative director for the Spanish Junior Eurovision performance in 2023. RTVE appointed Raúl Amor as Lucas's stylist and costume designer and Verónica Ferreiro as his vocal coach.
