= Netherlands in the Junior Eurovision Song Contest 2026 =

- Junior Eurovision Song Contest 2026
- Participating broadcaster: AVROTROS
- Country: Netherlands
- Selection process: Junior Songfestival 2026
- Selection date: 19 September 2026

Competing entry
- Song: "Stronger Together"
- Artist: Maria
- Songwriters: Mell Jonk; Ton Dijkman

Placement
- Final result: 8th, 126 points

Participation chronology

The Netherlands was represented at the Junior Eurovision Song Contest 2026 with the song "Stronger Together", written by Mell Jonk and Ton Dijkman, and performed by Maria. The Dutch participating broadcaster, AVROTROS, organised the national final Junior Songfestival 2026 in order to select its entry for the contest.

== Background ==
Prior to the 2026 contest, the Netherlands had participated in the contest twenty-two times since its first entry in the inaugural 2003 contest. Since then, the country has won the contest on one occasion in 2009 with the song "Click Clack" performed by Ralf Mackenbach. The Netherlands is the only country to have taken part in every edition of the contest. Since 2014, as the result of a merger between the AVRO – which had previously been in charge of the Netherlands' participation in the contest – and TROS into the current AVROTROS, it is the latter who participates representing the Netherlands. In 2025, Meadow represented the Netherlands with the song "Freeze" and finished 10th with 93 points.

== Before Junior Eurovision ==
=== Junior Songfestival 2026 ===
Junior Songfestival 2026 was the twenty-third edition of Junior Songfestival, the national final format developed by AVROTROS to select Dutch entries for the Junior Eurovision Song Contest. The event was held on 19 September 2026 at the RTM Stage in Rotterdam.

==== Format ====
The selection took place over four stages: in the first stage, an expert committee assessed the applications and selected 45 acts for an audition round, excerpts from which were published on the competition's official YouTube channel on 3 and 17 April, and 3 and 15 May 2026; the selected singers were then divided into four groups and attended a workshop with vocal coaches and choreographers, after which a number of artists advanced to the final audition, where a jury selected nine finalists, who were then divided into four acts and assigned original songs to record in a studio. At the final, the winner was determined by a combination of votes from an kids jury (traditionally made up of past Junior Songfestival participants), a professional jury (made up of industry professionals) and an online vote – each awarding sets of 8–10 and 12 points – with the latter taking precedence in the event of a tie.

==== Competing entries ====
The submission process for interested artists aged between nine and fourteen was open between 21 September 2025 and 25 January 2026. On 29 May 2026, AVROTROS announced the first group of finalists, with the remaining finalists announced on 5 June 2026. The acts were revealed on 12 June 2026, while the songs were released daily between 7 and 10 July 2026.

Artist	Song	Songwriter(s)
Maria	"Stronger Together"	Mell Jonk; Ton Dijkman
Nolan	"Crush"	Allan Eshuijs; Jiska de Jonge
The Crossovers	"Crossovers"	Willem Laseroms
Vajèn	"Here I Am"	Lars Koehoorn

==== Final ====
The final took place on 19 September 2026. The kids jury panel consisted of Junior Songfestival 2025 participants Level Up and Meadow, while the professional jury panel – the members of which also provided feedback in regards to the performances during the show – consisted of singers Numidia, Berget Lewis, and DJ duo Kris Kross Amsterdam. In addition to the competing entries, the finalists performed a common song titled "Make It Happen" and a promotional song for the anti-bullying campaign Stip it titled "Stop Right Now". Nine-year-old Maria was declared the winner with the song "Stronger Together".

Final – 19 September 2026
R/O	Artist	Song	Kids jury	Prof. jury	Online vote	Total	Place
1	Nolan	"Crush"	8	10	10	28	4
2	Vajèn	"Here I Am"	12	9	8	29	3
3	The Crossovers	"Crossovers"	9	8	12	29	2
4	Maria	"Stronger Together"	10	12	9	31	1

== At Junior Eurovision ==
The Junior Eurovision Song Contest 2026 took place at the Malta Fairs & Conventions Centre in Ta' Qali, Malta on 24 October 2026.

Netherlands performed in position 1, preceding the entry from Cyprus.

The contest attracted 175.000 viewers and a 1,0% share on NPO 3 in average. Overall, the audience share matched the 2025 contest, with viewer interest up 6,000 viewers year on year.
