= Poland in the Junior Eurovision Song Contest 2026 =

- Junior Eurovision Song Contest 2026
- Participating broadcaster: Telewizja Polska (TVP)
- Country: Poland
- Selection process: Artist: The Voice Kids season 9; Song: Internal Selection
- Selection date: Artist: 9 May 2026; Song: 18 September 2026

Competing entry
- Song: "Gravity"
- Artist: Wiktor Sas
- Songwriters: Antoni Alagierski; Coach Harrison; Małgorzata Uściłowska; Mikołaj Trybulec

Placement
- Final result: 6th, 144 points

Participation chronology

Poland will be represented at the Junior Eurovision Song Contest 2026 with the song "Gravity", written by Antoni Alagierski, Coach Harrison, Małgorzata Uściłowska, and Mikołaj Trybulec, and performed by Wiktor Sas. The Polish participating broadcaster, Telewizja Polska (TVP), selected its artist through the ninth season of The Voice Kids, while the song was internally selected.

== Background ==
Before the 2026 contest, Telewizja Polska (TVP) had participated in the Junior Eurovision Song Contest representing Poland twelve times since its first entry in the inaugural 2003 contest. Since then, it has won the contest on two occasions: in 2018 with "Anyone I Want to Be" performed by Roksana Węgiel and in 2019 with "Superhero" performed by Viki Gabor, becoming the first country to win consecutively. TVP opted not to take part in the contest between 2005 and 2015, originally due to unsatisfactory results, though Juliusz Braun, president of TVP between 2011 and 2015, later stated that the broadcaster analysed participation "when proposals appeared" and "decided that such a project is not appropriate for public television. It is drawing children into show business"; "Coś mnie nosi" performed by Kasia Żurawik and "Łap życie" by Kwadro both ended up in last place in 2003 and 2004, respectively. Poland also placed second in 2021 with "Somebody" performed by Sara James, marking its third and thus far final top five finish. In 2025, Marianna Kłos competed for Poland with the song "Brightest Light", which ended up in 8th place out of 18 entries with 139 points.

== Before Junior Eurovision ==
=== The Voice Kids ===
On 19 May 2025, TVP announced that its entrant for the 2026 contest would be selected through the ninth season of The Voice Kids, scheduled for spring 2026; all Polish representatives between 2018 and 2025 had competed in the program ahead of their participation in Junior Eurovision. The broadcaster opened an application period for interested artists to submit their applications on 5 May 2025, originally set to last until 18 May 2025; shortly before the closing, the deadline was extended until the following 1 June. The age range for the competition was also revised from between 8 and 14 years old at the time of the shows to 9–14 years old during the approximate time frame in which Junior Eurovision would be held, in accordance with the contest's eligibility rules.

==== Coaches and their teams ====
The judging panel consists of three coaches. The coaches are a group of music industry professionals who can give the artists the choice to join their teams by pressing their "I Want You" button. They are :

- Blanka – Represented Poland in the Eurovision Song Contest 2023; is a singer and model.
- Cleo – Represented Poland in the Eurovision Song Contest 2014
- Tribbs – A DJ, songwriter, producer.

Artists were selected over multiple blind auditions. (Note: Sources) They later went through Sing-offs and battles in which some artists would be eliminated.

==== Shows ====
===== Blind Auditions =====
Key
✔	Coach pressed "I WANT YOU" button
	Artist defaulted to this coach's team
	Artist picked a coach's team
	Artist eliminated with no coach pressing their "I WANT YOU" button

First episode's results
Order	Artist	Song	Coach's and artist's choices		
Order	Artist	Song	Blanka	Tribbs	Cleo
1	Benjamin Gilbert	"Let It Be"	—	✔	✔
2	Leon Pawlikowski	"In My Blood"	✔	✔	✔
3	Wiktor Sas	"Unforgettable"	✔	✔	✔
4	Tosia Gajewska	"Wymyśliłam cię"	✔	✔	✔
5	Janek Słubik	"Espresso Macchiato"	✔	–	✔
6	Hania Kukuszka	"Anyone I Want to Be"	–	✔	✔
7	Karol Kawiecki	"Jesteśmy na wczasach"	—	—	—
8	Alan Lubiński	"Thinking Out Loud"	✔	✔	✔
9	Leon Skorupski	"Nad przepaścią"	✔	✔	✔
10	Hania Drewniak	"Na ostrzu"	✔	—	—
11	Lena Mucha	"Wierna, odważna i prawa"	–	–	–
12	Wiktoria Szewczyk	"Róż"	—	—	✔

Second episode's results
Order	Artist	Song	Coach's and artist's choices		
Order	Artist	Song	Blanka	Tribbs	Cleo
1	Zosia Marchalewicz	"Texas Hold'em"	✔	—	✔
2	Hubert Zdanowski	"Zanim pójdę"	–	–	–
3	Antosia Grobelna	"Turning Tables"	✔	—	✔
4	Wiktoria Syrek	"Niebo to my"	✔	✔	✔
5	Basia Barylak	"Can't Hold Us"	–	–	—
6	Amelka Łęczycka	"Somebody"	✔	✔	✔
7	Amelia Sowińska	"Laura"	✔	✔	✔
8	Rysiek Rychwalski	"Tam słońce, gdzie my"	—	—	–
9	Zuzia Zakolska	"Born with a Broken Heart"	✔	✔	✔
10	Emilka Wijas	"Puszek okruszek"	✔	✔	✔
11	Wiktoria Krawczyk	"Another Love"	–	–	✔
12	Lenka Wierzchowska	"How Am I Supposed to Live Without You"	✔	✔	✔

Third episode's results
Order	Artist	Song	Coach's and artist's choices		
Order	Artist	Song	Blanka	Tribbs	Cleo
1	Michał Polkowski	"Nie ma, nie ma ciebie"	✔	✔	✔
2	Amira Just	"Anxiety"	–	–	–
3	Maja Stawecka	"1+1"	—	✔	✔
4	Marysia Rogowicz	"Defying Gravity"	—	✔	✔
5	Kuba Baraniecki	"All I Ever Asked"	✔	–	—
6	Pola Dębno-Artwińska	"Faith"	✔	✔	✔
7	Łucja Dobrogowska	"Superhero"	✔	✔	✔
8	Ala Jałocha	"Mój, tylko mój"	—	—	–
9	Franek Machul	"Pożegnanie z bajką"	✔	–	✔
10	Ania Jankowska	"End of Beginning"	✔	—	✔
11	Zuza Brydniak	"Murder on the Dancefloor"	–	–	–
12	Lena Kraska	"This World"	✔	—	✔

Fourth episode's results
Order	Artist	Song	Coach's and artist's choices		
Order	Artist	Song	Blanka	Tribbs	Cleo
1	Szymon Kortyka	"Powiedz stary, gzdieś ty był"	✔	—	✔
2	Kinga Maciążek	"Despacito"	✔	–	–
3	Nina Szymańska	"Liryka"	—	—	—
4	Nina Kulanica	"Heather"	✔	—	✔
5	Hania Nowakowska	"Za krokiem krok"	—	–	—
6	Konrad Pochwala	"Save Your Kisses for Me"	✔	✔	✔
7	Ola Piłat	"Bye"	✔	✔	✔
8	Magnus Karczewski	"Mamony milion"	—	✔	–
9	Nikola Sowińska	"Young and Beautiful"	✔	✔	✔
10	Julia Konopacka	"Killing Me"	—	—	—
11	Nadia Wolner	"Po to jesteś na świecie"	✔	–	–
12	Nikola Mazur	"Forever Young"	✔	✔	✔

Fifth episode's results
Order	Artist	Song	Coach's and artist's choices		
Order	Artist	Song	Blanka	Tribbs	Cleo
1	Melania Miętus	"Eye of the Tiger"	—	—	✔
2	Julia Kosim	"Kolorowy wiatr"	✔	–	–
3	Ala Więcek	"Only Love Can Hurt Like This"	—	✔	✔
4	Adam Saternus	"Kamień z napisem love"	✔	—	✔
5	Franek Jarzębski	"Orki z Majorki"	—	–	—
6	Oliwia Johnson	"Symphony"	✔	✔	✔
7	Olivia Golańska	"Na morza dnie"	✔	—	✔
8	Karolina Musialik	"Sweet Child o' Mine"	—	✔	✔
9	Kuba Siejca	"Redemption Song"	—	—	—
10	Enya Hant	"Naucz mnie"	✔	✔	–
11	Kacper Malinowski	"Momma Song"	—	✔	✔
12	Natalia Hawlena	"Heavy"	✔	✔	✔

Sixth episode's results
Order	Artist	Song	Coach's and artist's choices		
Order	Artist	Song	Blanka	Tribbs	Cleo
1	Julia Mosiądz	"My"	—	—	—
2	Szymon Karłowicz	"Drobnostka"	✔	✔	✔
3	Pola Zawadzka	"Paparazzi"	✔	✔	✔
4	Wiktor Bródka	"Helena"	—	—	—
5	Zosia Tofiluk	"Creepin'"	—	–	—
6	Maja Krzyżek	"Tatuaż"	✔	✔	✔
7	Lilia Snuzik-Śliwa	"You Are Not Alone"	✔	—	✔
8	Kornelia Fornalczyk	"Girl on Fire"	✔	✔	✔
9	Patryk Bylinka	"Fairytale"	—	—	—
10	Lena Witkowska	"Bezsensownie"	✔	—	–
11	Maja Budzik	"I'm Good (Blue)"	—	—	—
12	Lena Kierklo	"And I Am Telling You I'm Not Going"	✔	✔	✔

===== Battles and Sing-Offs =====
First Battles' results
Coach	Order	Winner	Song	Losers
Cleo	1	Kornelia Fornalczyk	"APT."	Emilka Wijas
Cleo	1	Kornelia Fornalczyk	"APT."	Janek Słubik
Cleo	2	Franek Machul	"Złoto"	Szymon Karłowicz
Cleo	2	Franek Machul	"Złoto"	Szymon Kortyka
Cleo	3	Lena Kierklo	"Strong Enough"	Adam Saternus
Cleo	3	Lena Kierklo	"Strong Enough"	Melania Miętus
Cleo	4	Leon Skorupski	"Proszę tańcz"	Wiktoria Krawczyk
Cleo	4	Leon Skorupski	"Proszę tańcz"	Wiktoria Szewczyk
Cleo	5	Ola Piłat	"Sutra"	Natalia Hawlena
Cleo	5	Ola Piłat	"Sutra"	Nina Kulanica
Cleo	6	Oliwia Johnson	"I'm Every Woman"	Marysia Rogowicz
Cleo	6	Oliwia Johnson	"I'm Every Woman"	Wiktoria Syrek

First Sing-Off's results
Coach	Order	Artist	Song	Result
Cleo	1	Kornelia Fornalczyk	"Girl on Fire"	Eliminated
Cleo	2	Franek Machul	"Pożegnanie z bajką"	Eliminated
Cleo	3	Lena Kierklo	"And I Am Telling You I'm Not Going"	Eliminated
Cleo	4	Leon Skorupski	"Nad przepaścią"	Advanced
Cleo	5	Ola Piłat	"Bye"	Advanced
Cleo	6	Oliwia Johnson	"Symphony"	Advanced

Second Battles' results
Coach	Order	Winner	Song	Losers
Blanka	1	Ania Jankowska	"Ten sen"	Hania Drewniak
Blanka	1	Ania Jankowska	"Ten sen"	Zosia Marchalewicz
Blanka	2	Tosia Gajewska	"Oto Ja"	Konrad Pochwała
Blanka	2	Tosia Gajewska	"Oto Ja"	Lilia Snuzik-Śliwa
Blanka	3	Oliwia Golańska	"The Climb"	Kinga Maciążek
Blanka	3	Oliwia Golańska	"The Climb"	Lena Witkowska
Blanka	4	Alan Lubiński	"I ciebie też, bardzo"	Kuba Baraniecki
Blanka	4	Alan Lubiński	"I ciebie też, bardzo"	Zuzia Zakolska
Blanka	5	Maja Krzyżek	"One Last Time"	Lenka Wierzchowska
Blanka	5	Maja Krzyżek	"One Last Time"	Nadia Wolner
Blanka	6	Antosia Grobelna	"Un-Break My Heart"	Julia Kosim
Blanka	6	Antosia Grobelna	"Un-Break My Heart"	Lena Kraska

Second Sing-Off's results
Coach	Order	Artist	Song	Result
Blanka	1	Ania Jankowska	"End of Beginning"	Advanced
Blanka	2	Tosia Gajewska	"Wymyśliłam cię"	Eliminated
Blanka	3	Oliwia Golańska	"Na morza dnie"	Eliminated
Blanka	4	Alan Lubiński	"Thinking Out Loud"	Advanced
Blanka	5	Maja Krzyżek	"Tatuaż"	Eliminated
Blanka	6	Antosia Grobelna	"Turning Tables"	Advanced

Third Battles' results
Coach	Order	Winner	Song	Losers
Tribbs	1	Ala Więcek	“Titanium”	Hania Kukuszka
Tribbs	1	Ala Więcek	“Titanium”	Pola Dębno-Artwińska
Tribbs	2	Amelka Łęczycka	“Czy już wszystkie masz?”	Benjamin Gilbert
Tribbs	2	Amelka Łęczycka	“Czy już wszystkie masz?”	Pola Zawadzka
Tribbs	3	Wiktor Sas	“Addicted to You”	Magnus Karczewski
Tribbs	3	Wiktor Sas	“Addicted to You”	Maja Stawecka
Tribbs	4	Nikola Mazur	“Ne rozumiju”	Łucja Dobrogowska
Tribbs	4	Nikola Mazur	“Ne rozumiju”	Michał Polkowski
Tribbs	5	Nikola Sowińska	“Motyle”	Amelia Sowińska
Tribbs	5	Nikola Sowińska	“Motyle”	Enya Hant
Tribbs	6	Leon Pawlikowski	“Glimpse of Us”	Kacper Malinowski
Tribbs	6	Leon Pawlikowski	“Glimpse of Us”	Karolina Musialik

Third Sing-Off's results
Coach	Order	Artist	Song	Result
Tribbs	1	Ala Więcek	“Only Love Can Hurt Like This”	Eliminated
Tribbs	2	Amelka Łęczycka	“Somebody”	Advanced
Tribbs	3	Wiktor Sas	“Unforgettable”	Advanced
Tribbs	4	Nikola Mazur	“Forever Young”	Eliminated
Tribbs	5	Nikola Sowińska	“Young and Beautiful”	Eliminated
Tribbs	6	Leon Pawlikowski	“In My Blood”	Advanced

===== Final =====
At first, it was announced that the final will take place on 25 April 2026, however, it was later moved to 9 May 2026. In the first round a jury picked the one artist from each team, in the second the public chose the winner. There were also guest performances from JJ, the winner of the Eurovision Song Contest 2025 for Austria, Lou Deleuze, the winner of Junior Eurovision Song Contest 2025 for France, Marianna Kłos, the representative for Poland at the Junior Eurovision Song Contest 2025, Zosia Wójcik, winner of The Voice Kids Poland, and Violetta Kapcewicz, the winner of the 7th edition of The Voice Senior Poland. Wiktor Sas was declared the winner.

First Round’s results
Order	Coach	Artist	Song	Result
1	Cleo	Ola Piłat	“Hero”	Eliminated
2	Cleo	Leon Skorupski	“Jaskółka uwięziona”	Eliminated
3	Cleo	Oliwia Johnson	“I’m Here”	Advanced
4	Blanka	Ania Jankowska	“Długość dźwięku samotności”	Eliminated
5	Blanka	Alan Lubiński	“Someone You Loved”	Eliminated
6	Blanka	Antosia Grobelna	“I Have Nothing”	Advanced
7	Tribbs	Wiktor Sas	“River”	Advanced
8	Tribbs	Amelka Łeczycka	“Mam tę moc”	Eliminated
9	Tribbs	Leon Pawlikowski	“Creep”	Eliminated

Second Round’s results
Coach	Artist	Order	Song (Duet with the coach)	Order	Song (Original song)	Songwriter(s)	Result
Cleo	Oliwia Johnson	1	“At Last”	4	“O miłości, nie ten czas”	Jacek Mrówczyński; Jakub Laszuk; Jeremi Siejka; Paula Roma; Stanisław Szroeder; Szymon Mikła	Finalists
Blanka	Antosia Grobelna	2	“Summertime Sadness”	5	“Znajduję swe miejsce”	Jacek Mrówczyński; Jakub Laszuk; Jeremi Siejka; Paula Roma; Stanisław Szroeder; Szymon Mikła	Finalists
Tribbs	Wiktor Sas	3	“Jealous”	6	“Bilet”	Brajan Jan Litkowiec; Jacek Mrówczyński; Jakub Laszuk; Jeremi Siejka; Krzysztof Junak; Paula Roma; Stanisław Szroeder; Szymon Mikła	Winner

== At Junior Eurovision ==
In Poland, the event was broadcast live on TVP2, TVP ABC and TVP Polonia with commentary provided by Artur Orzech. The contest attracted 1.700.000 viewers and a 20,1% share across three channel in average, being the highest figure since the 2023 contest and the highest market share for the contest since TVP hosted the contest in 2020.

=== Performance ===
Wiktor wore a black jacket with crystals overlayed with denim. The performance featured cool blue backdrop and a choreographed dance sequence. Wiktor’s performance was directed by Tomasz Motyl and was choreographed by Tomek Prządka. Wiktor was joined on stage by four female dancers: Wiktoria Wiśniewska, Kaja Ilska, Alicja Chmiel, and Kamila Surynt. The dancers were selected from an open casting process that featured dancers from across Poland.
