= Malta Fairs & Conventions Centre =

Multi-purpose venue in Attard, Malta

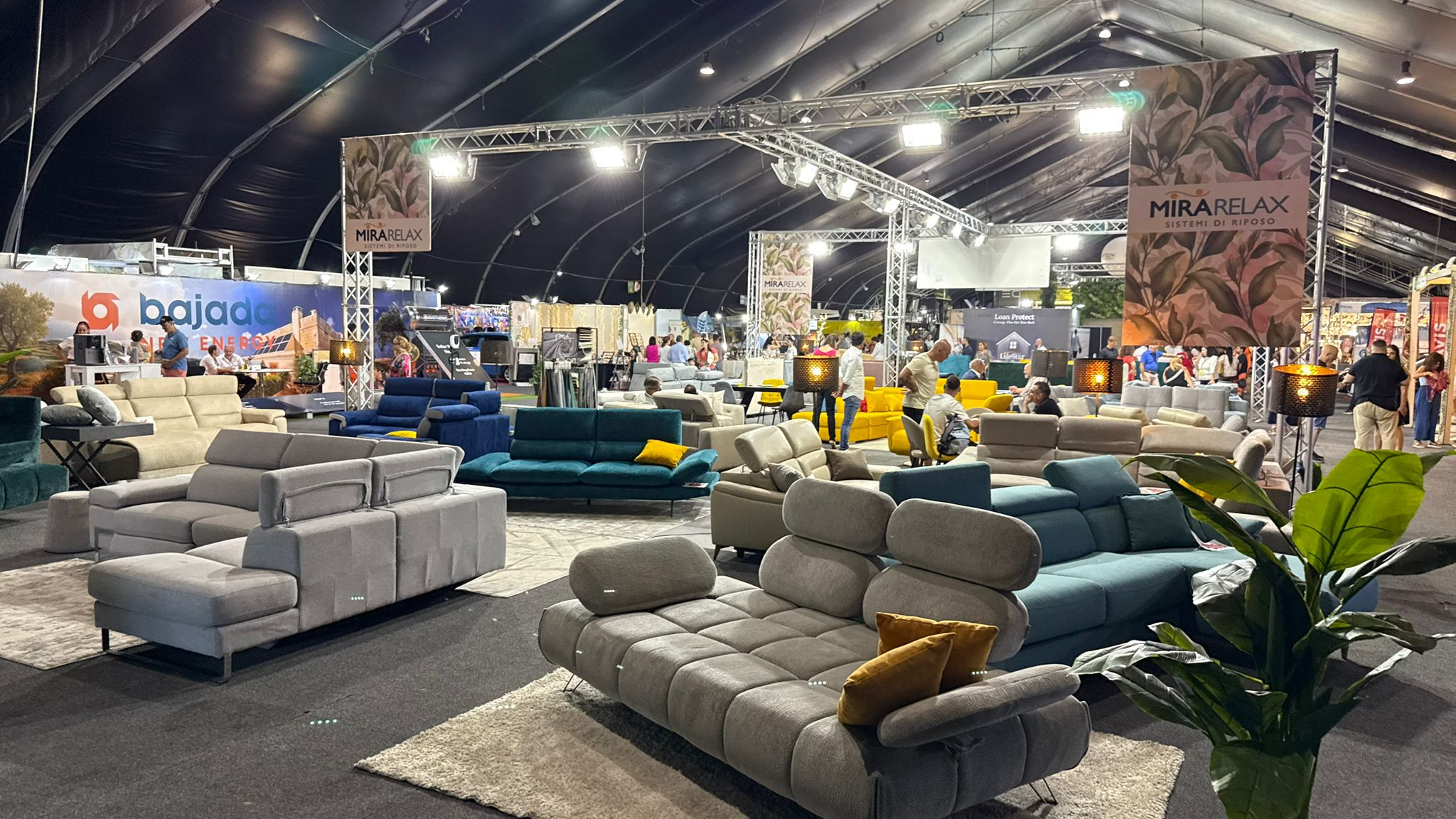
- MFCC in 2025
- Interactive map of Malta Fairs & Conventions Centre
- Address: Level 1, Millennium Stand, National Stadium, Ta' Qali
- Location: Ta' Qali, Attard, Malta
- Coordinates: 35°53′44.4″N 14°25′2.9″E
- Owner: Corinthia Group
- Capacity: 10,268 seated or 14,000 standing

Construction
- Built: 2006
- Opened: December 2006
- Expanded: November 2018

Website
- www.mfcc.com.mt

The Malta Fairs & Conventions Centre (also known as MFCC) is a multi-purpose venue located in Ta' Qali, Attard, Malta. The centre can be used for concerts, exhibitions, trade fairs, examinations, conferences, galas and weddings. After its expansion in 2018, the venue measures 170m x 50m, totalling 8,500 m^{2}. The venue can hold up to 14,000 people standing and 10,268 people seated, making it Malta's largest indoor venue. It also hosts the most anticipated Malta Book Festival.

== History ==
The venue was established in December 2006 on part of the former Royal Air Force base at Ta Kali which closed in 1968. It has since become the most successful venue in Malta. Prior to opening in Malta, the venue was used by Wembley Arena as a temporary concert venue whilst the main arena was undergoing refurbishment work during 2005 and 2006.

== Architecture ==
The venue is a tension fabric structure and it has a total floor space of 8,500 m^{2} (10,200 sq yd) with a 17m apex. The structure contains three RS Marquee Arches with a 30 tonne rigging capacity each. A bespoke removable track system means each six-metre wide arch can be moved along the length of the structure to provide overhead load-bearing capabilities in any position to accommodate the incoming production requirements.

== Entertainment ==
The centre has been used for many musical concerts and shows.

The Malta Fairs & Conventions Centre has hosted concerts for multiple high-profile artists such as Calvin Harris, Tom Jones, Laura Pausini, Andrea Bocelli, Zucchero, Anastacia and David Guetta.

The centre has also been used to host multiple local events, most notably the televised selection show that determines Malta's entry for the Eurovision Song Contest. The centre has also hosted the 24th Junior Eurovision Song Contest, Malta's Got Talent, X Factor Malta and Muzika Muzika.

== See also ==
- Maltese International Trade Fair Grounds
