= Portugal in the Junior Eurovision Song Contest 2025 =

- Junior Eurovision Song Contest 2025
- Participating broadcaster: Rádio e Televisão de Portugal (RTP)
- Country: Portugal
- Selection process: Artist: The Voice Kids 6 Song: Internal selection
- Selection date: Artist: 13 July 2025; Song: 7 November 2025

Competing entry
- Song: "Para onde vai o amor?"
- Artist: Inês Gonçalves
- Songwriters: Aurora Pinto; Bernardo Espinho; João Direitinho; Miguel Cristovinho

Placement
- Final result: 13th, 73 points

Participation chronology

Portugal was represented at the Junior Eurovision Song Contest 2025 with the song "Para onde vai o amor?", written by Aurora Pinto, Bernardo Espinho, João Direitinho, and Miguel Cristovinho, and performed by Inês Gonçalves. The Portuguese participating broadcaster, Rádio e Televisão de Portugal (RTP), selected its artist for the contest through The Voice Kids Portugal (Season 6) and the song internally.

== Background ==
Prior to the 2025 contest, Portugal participated in the contest nine times, first entering in 2006. Portugal finished second-last in both 2006 and 2007, and Portuguese broadcaster Rádio e Televisão de Portugal (RTP) withdrew after the 2007 contest, despite high viewing figures. Portugal returned in 2017 and participated until 2019. Portugal provisionally confirmed their participation in the 2020 contest, but ultimately withdrew due to the COVID-19 pandemic. Their best result came in 2024, when Victoria Nicole finished second with her song "Esperança"; winning the televote with 117 points and coming fourth with the juries receiving 96 points.

== Before Junior Eurovision ==
=== The Voice Kids 6 ===
RTP confirmed its intention to participate in the 2025 contest on 8 Marxch 2025, also confirming that it would use the sixth season of the talent show The Voice Kids, hosted by Catarina Furtado, to select its entry, and opened the submission process for interested artists aged between eight and fourteen. The coaches of the series were Diogo Piçarra, Nena, Miguel Cristovinho and Cuca Roseta.

==== Final ====
The final took place on 13 July 2025. The winner was selected through two rounds of voting. In the first round of voting, four artists were selected to proceed to the second round by their respective coaches, i.e. one from each team. In the second round, the public vote selected Inês Gonçalves of team Cristo as the winner.

Key: Winner

Final – Second round – 13 July 2025
R/O	Artist	Song
1	Lara Martins	"Pie Jesu"
2	Maria Vinagre	"Anyone"
3	Inês Gonçalves	"À Janela"
4	Matilde Azevedo	"Não faz mal não estar bem"

=== Song selection ===
The song that was to be performed by Gonçalves was confirmed to be "Para onde vai o amor?" and it was released on 7 November 2025, with an accompanying music video. The song was written by Aurora Pinto, Bernardo Espinho, João Direitinho and Miguel Cristovinho.

== At Junior Eurovision ==
The Junior Eurovision Song Contest 2025 took place at the Gymnastic Hall of Olympic City in Tbilisi, Georgia on 13 December 2025. On 4 November 2025, an allocation draw was held to determine the running order of the contest, ahead of which each song was classified into a different category based on its musical style and tempo. Portugal was drawn to perform in position 13, following the entry from the Italy and before the entry from Spain.

=== Voting ===
The same voting system that was introduced in the 2017 edition will be used, where the results will be determined by 50% online voting and 50% jury voting. Every participating broadcaster assembles a national jury that consists of three music industry professionals and two children aged between 10 and 15 who are citizens of the country they represent. The rankings of those jurors are combined to make an overall top ten.

The online voting consists of two phases. The first phase of the online voting will begin on 12 December 2025 when a recap of all the rehearsal performances is shown on the contest's website Junioreurovision.tv before the viewers can vote. After this, voters will also have the option to watch longer one-minute clips from each participant's rehearsal. This first round of voting will end on 13 December at 16:59 CET. The second phase of the online voting will take place during the live show and begin right after the last performance and will be open for 15 minutes. International viewers will be able to vote for three songs. They will also be able to vote for their own country's song. These votes will then be turned into points which will be determined by the percentage of votes received. For example, if a song receives 10% of the votes, it will receive 10% of the available points.

Victoria Nicole who represented them in 2024 was announced to be their spokesperson for the final. Portugal finished 13th in the contest with 73 points; 32 from the jury and 41 from the online voting

Points awarded to Portugal
Score	Country
12 points	
10 points	
8 points	
7 points	Albania
6 points	Ireland
5 points	
4 points	Croatia
3 points	Poland; Montenegro; Georgia
2 points	Italy; Armenia; Netherlands
1 point	
Portugal received 41 points from the online vote

Points awarded by Portugal
Score	Country
12 points	Spain
10 points	Georgia
8 points	France
7 points	Poland
6 points	Armenia
5 points	Albania
4 points	San Marino
3 points	Ukraine
2 points	North Macedonia
1 point	Malta
