= Inês Gonçalves =

- Born: 22 November 2012 (age 13); Ourique, Alentejo, Portugal
- Occupation: Singer
- Years active: 2023–present
- Formerly of: Inês & Dário

Inês Gonçalves (born 22 November 2012) is a Portuguese child singer. She began her career as the winner of the sixth season of The Voice Kids Portugal, which gave her the opportunity to represent Portugal at the Junior Eurovision Song Contest 2025 with the song "Para onde vai o amor?".

== Biography ==
=== Early life ===
Gonçalves was born in Ourique, Alentejo, Portugal, on 22 November 2012. After soon moving to Penafiel, she returned to her native city during her kindergarten years. As of 2025, the singer still lived in Alentejo with her mother and siblings, Alice and Santiago.

Having started singing at the age of three, she is currently a member of the Ourique Children's Choir and a singing trio.

Her father, Ivo Gonçalves, is a professional footballer who plays as a goalkeeper for ADC Várzea do Douro.

=== 2023–2025: The Voice Kids Portugal, Junior Eurovision Song Contest, and local activity ===
Gonçalves began her professional music career in 2023, performing with her friend Dário Pereira on Manuel Luís Goucha's show Goucha. The following year, the duo competed in Got Talent Portugal, organised by Portuguese broadcaster RTP, where they sang "Roubei-te um beijo" by Buba Espinho.

In 2025, the singer participated in the sixth season of The Voice Kids Portugal. Under the mentorship of Miguel Cristovinho, she eventually won the competition, which had been announced as the Portuguese selection for Junior Eurovision Song Contest 2025 in Tbilisi, Georgia, earning the right to represent the country. Her contest song, "Para onde vai o amor?", written by her The Voice Kids Portugal mentor Cristovinho, Espinho, João Direitinho, and Aurora Pinto, was released on 7 November.

The Voice Kids Portugal performances and results (2025)
Stage	Song	Result	Ref.
Blind Auditions	"À janela" (by Roberto Carlos)	Advanced	
Battle Rounds	—N/a	Advanced	
Semi-Final	"Um dia hei de voltar" (by Buba Espinho and Bandidos do Cante)	Advanced	
Final (Round 1)	"Rosa albardeira" (by António Zambujo)	Advanced	
Final (Round 2)	"À janela" (by Roberto Carlos)	Winner	
Final (Additional performances)	"Casa" (by D.A.M.A and Buba Espinho)	—N/a	

== Discography ==
=== Singles ===
Title	Year	Album or EP	Length	Ref.
"Para onde vai o amor?"	2025	Non-album singles	3:00	

== Videography ==
=== Music videos ===
==== As lead artist ====
Title	Year	Director(s)	Ref.
"Para onde vai o amor?"	2025	—N/a	

==== As featured artist ====
Title	Year	Director(s)	Ref.
"É tão grande o Alentejo" (by Buba Espinho)	2024	Patrícia Santos, Miguel Cristovinho	

Awards and achievements
Preceded by Victoria Nicole with "Esperança"	Portugal in the Junior Eurovision Song Contest; 2025	Succeeded by Salvador Rio with "Alma"
