= Bandidos do Cante =

Portuguese band

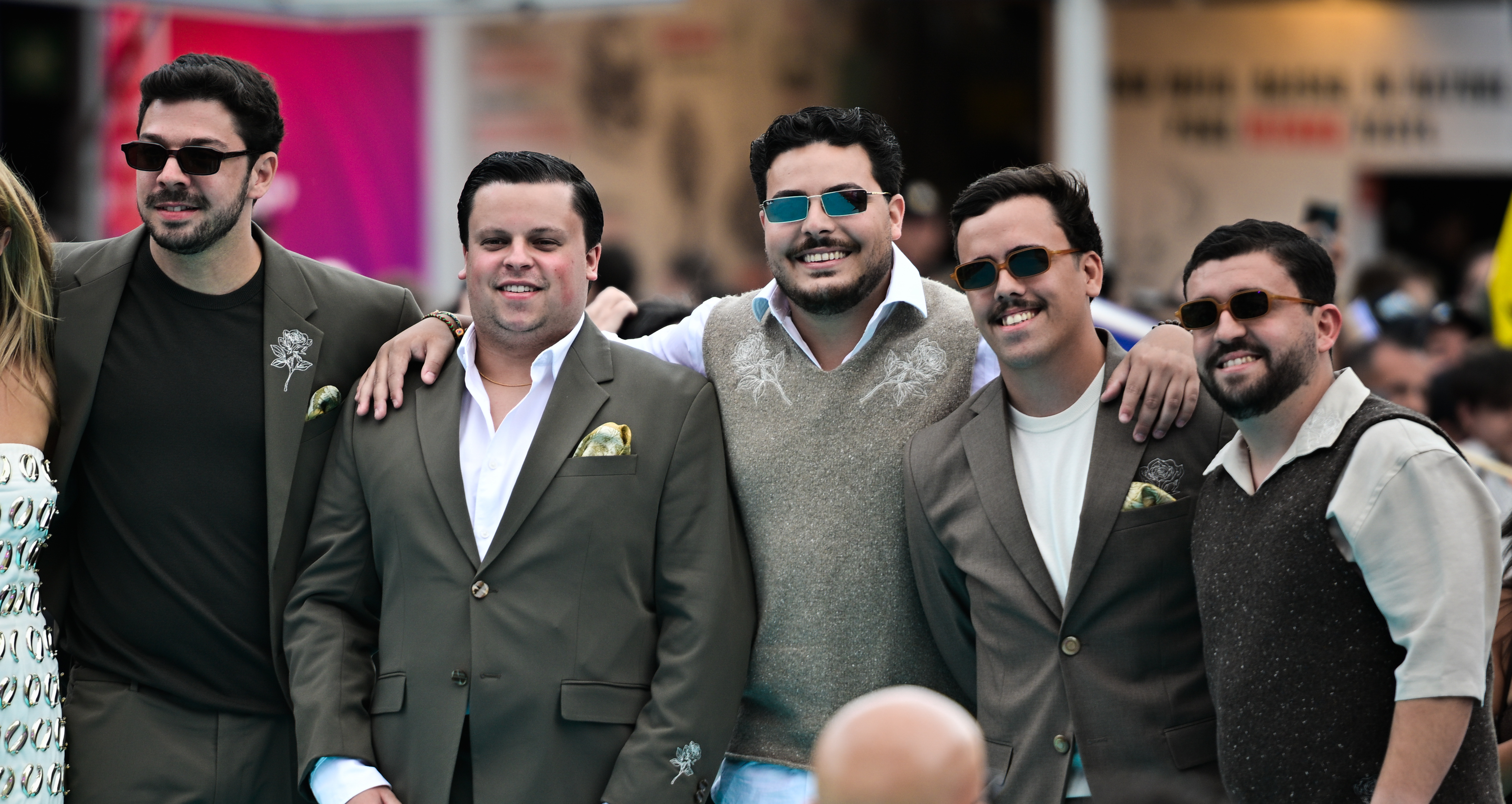
- Bandidos do Cante in 2026

Background information
- Also known as: Amigos do Alentejo (2022–2023)
- Origin: Beja, Portugal
- Genres: Cante Alentejano; pop
- Years active: 2022–present
- Labels: Virgin; Universal
- Members: Miguel Costa; Duarte Farias; Francisco "Kiko" Raposo; Luís Aleixo; Francisco Pestana

Bandidos do Cante are a Portuguese musical group originating from Beja, in the Alentejo region. The quintet is composed of Miguel Costa, Duarte Farias, Francisco "Kiko" Raposo, Luís Aleixo and Francisco Pestana, all natives of the municipality of Beja, except for Francisco Pestana, who is from Monte Trigo, in the municipality of Portel. The group distinguishes themselves by its fusion of Cante Alentejano and contemporary and pop sounds. They represented Portugal in the Eurovision Song Contest 2026 with the song "Rosa".

== History ==
=== Origins and formation (2022–2023) ===
The members of Bandidos do Cante grew up listening to and singing Alentejo folk songs from an early age, in a family context and among friends. In their teens, it was socializing that kept the five members connected to the musical genre — they would get together to eat, drink and sing with friends.

The group's history as a consolidated ensemble began almost by accident, one evening at dinner that ended in singing. From this gathering came the invitation, at the end of 2022, to record vocals on the single "Casa", by the band D.A.M.A in collaboration with Buba Espinho. The song had an immediate impact, reaching millions of listens and heavy rotation on national radio stations. In this initial phase, they were still known as Amigos do Alentejo. In June 2023, during a tour with D.A.M.A and Espinho at the Coliseu dos Recreios, D.A.M.A member Kasha presented them as Bandidos do Cante, a name which they promptly adopted.

=== First singles (2024–2025) ===
With a desire to create their own project, Bandidos do Cante debuted with original music in 2024. The first single, "Amigos Coloridos", featured composition by the group in partnership with Jorge Benvinda and co-production with Eduardo Espinho. The song became the most listened to Portuguese song on national radio at the time of its release, establishing the band as one of the biggest revelations of Portuguese music and leading them to perform more than 50 concerts in 2024 throughout the country.

In 2025, Bandidos do Cante released their second original single, "Já Não Há Pardais No Céu", confirming the consistency of their creative journey. The band was nominated for the Breakthrough Artist category at the 2025 Portuguese Music Play Awards. That same year, they participated in a sold-out concert at the Coliseu dos Recreios, at the invitation of Espinho.

=== Bairro das Flores and Eurovision (2026–present) ===
In January 2026, Bandidos do Cante released their debut studio album, entitled Bairro das Flores, published by Virgin/Universal. The album, composed of eight original tracks, revisits Cante Alentejano in the light of the present, exploring the boundary between tradition and contemporaneity. The album features a special participation by António Zambujo on the single "Primavera", an artist from Beja and an acknowledged reference for the group, and brings together work with several producers, including Agir, Eduardo Espinho, Jon and Rodrigo Correia. The tour that preceded the release passed by MEO Arena and symbolically ended with two sold-out dates at the Teatro Municipal Pax Julia, in Beja, in a live tour that totaled dozens of concerts throughout the country.

On 22 January 2026, Bandidos do Cante group was selected to participate in the final of the Festival da Canção 2026, with the song "Rosa". Unlike several other finalists, they publicly stated that, if they won, they would represent Portugal in the Eurovision Song Contest 2026 in Vienna. The song performed first at the final on 7 March 2026, winning the final with 22 points, scoring the 10 points from the expert jury and 12 points from the public televote, and earning the privilege to represent Portugal at Eurovision.

At Eurovision, Bandidos do Cante was drawn to compete in the first half of the first semi-final in Vienna, Austria. On 12 May 2026, they performd "Rosa" at the semi-final, but failed to qualify to the grand final.

== Discography ==
Credits taken from Apple Music.

=== Studio albums ===
List of studio albums, with selected details and chart positions
Title	Details	Peak chart positions
Title	Details	POR
Bairro das Flores	Released: 9 January 2026; Label: Virgin, Universal Music Portugal; Formats: LP, digital download, streaming	21

=== Singles ===
==== As lead artist ====
Title	Year	Peak chart positions	Album or EP
Title	Year	POR Air.	Album or EP
"Casa" (with D.A.M.A and Buba Espinho)	2022	—	Non-album single
"Amigos coloridos"	2024	—	Bairro das Flores
"Um dia hei de voltar" (with Buba Espinho)	2024	—	Bairro das Flores
"Já não há pardais no céu"	2025	—	Bairro das Flores
"Tanto tempo"	2025	—	Bairro das Flores
"Primavera" (with António Zambujo)	2026	—	Bairro das Flores
"Rosa"	2026	22	Non-album single
"—" denotes a recording that did not chart or was not released in that territory.

Awards and achievements
Preceded by Napa with "Deslocado"	Portugal in the Eurovision Song Contest; 2026	Succeeded by TBD
