= Rosa (Bandidos do Cante song) =

2026 song by Bandidos do Cante

Single by Bandidos do Cante
- Language: Portuguese
- Released: 22 January 2026
- Genre: Folk pop
- Length: 2:59

Eurovision Song Contest 2026 entry
- Country: Portugal
- Artist: Bandidos do Cante
- Composers: Duarte Farias; Francisco Pestana; Francisco Raposo; Luís Aleixo; Miguel Costa
- Lyricists: Bluay; Duarte Farias; Francisco Pestana; Francisco Raposo; Gonçalo Narciso; Gui Alface; Kasha; Luís Aleixo; Miguel Costa

Finals performance
- Semi-final result: 12th
- Semi-final points: 74

Entry chronology
- ◄ "Deslocado" (2025)

"Rosa" is a song by Portuguese musical group Bandidos do Cante. Released in 2026, the song blends elements of Portuguese folk music with contemporary pop production. Represented Portugal in the Eurovision Song Contest 2026.

== Background, release and promotion ==
The song was inspired by traditional Cante Alentejano, a style of polyphonic singing originating from the Alentejo Region of Portugal. According to the group, "Rosa" was created as a tribute to Portuguese musical heritage while introducing modern arrangements and instrumentation.

"Rosa" was released on digital streaming platforms in 2026. The group promoted the song through festival performances and appearances on Portuguese television and radio programs. An accompanying music video was released shortly after the single's premiere. Filmed in rural Portugal, the video features landscapes of the Alentejo Region and imagery connected to Portuguese traditions.

Musically, "Rosa" combines acoustic guitar melodies, layered harmonies, and folk-inspired rhythms. The lyrics focus on themes of love, memory, and longing, using the figure of "Rosa" as a symbolic character. The song incorporates vocal harmonies influenced by traditional Portuguese choral singing alongside contemporary folk pop elements. The song received positive reviews from listeners and music critics, who praised its combination of traditional Portuguese influences and modern production. Critics particularly highlighted the group's vocal harmonies and atmospheric arrangement.

== Eurovision Song Contest ==
Portugal's Eurovision representative was chosen through the national final, Festival da Canção 2026. The final took place in March 2026, and "Rosa" won the competition by both jury and public vote, earning the right to represent Portugal. The 2026 Eurovision Song Contest was held in Wiener Stadthalle in Vienna, Austria.
