= The Voice Kids (Portuguese TV series) season 6 =

The Voice Kids
- Season 6
- Hosted by: Catarina Furtado; Maria Petronilho (backstage)
- Coaches: Diogo Piçarra; Nena; Miguel Cristovinho; Cuca Roseta
- No. of contestants: 63
- Winner: Inês Gonçalves
- Winning coach: Miguel Cristovinho
- Runners-up: Lara Martins; Maria Vinagre; Matilde Azevedo

Release
- Original network: RTP1
- Original release: 6 April – 13 July 2025

Season chronology
- ← Previous; Season 5 Next → Season 7

The sixth season of Portuguese The Voice Kids is a talent show broadcast on RTP1, which premiered on 6 April 2025. Of the coaches from the previous season, only Cuca Roseta returned, marking her second season as a coach. Former The Voice Portugal coach Diogo Piçarra debuted on the panel this season, replacing Carlão. Additionally, debutants Nena and Miguel Cristovinho joined the panel, replacing Bárbara Tinoco and Nininho Vaz Maia, respectively. Catarina Furtado returned as the host and Maria Petronilho debuted as backstage presenter, replacing Catarina Maia.

Inês Gonçalves won the competition on 13 July 2025, marking Miguel Cristovinho's first win as a coach and the second artist to receive a "superpass" in the blind auditions to go on and win an entire season (after Victoria Nicole in the previous season). Just like in the previous four seasons, The Voice Kids was the program used to select the Portuguese artist that would represent the country in the Junior Eurovision Song Contest 2025.

== Teams ==
Colour key

- Winner
- Runner-up
- Eliminated in the Live final
- Eliminated in the Semifinals
- Eliminated in Battles

Coaching teams
Coaches	Top 63 Artists					
Diogo Piçarra						
Diogo Piçarra	Maria Vinagre	Martim Ferreira	Sofia Caeiro	Beatriz Faria	Diana Gracia	Luca Monteiro
Diogo Piçarra	Violeta Amorim	Guilherme Azevedo	Matilde Branco	Mariana Capacho	Vasco Mendinhas	Gabriela Pereira
Diogo Piçarra	Matilde & Santiago	Francisca Santos	Leandro Souza	Zoé Veiga		
Nena						
Nena	Matilde Azevedo	João Oliveira	Bárbara Califórnia	Isa Ferreira	Filipa Nogueira	Isabel Pereira
Nena	Madalena Alves	Flor Cupido	Marta Dias	Leonor Domingos	Mathilde Hill Elbert	Constança Machado
Nena	Sara Mendes	Pedro Parreira	Francisca Pena	Eva Santos		
Miguel Cristovinho						
Miguel Cristovinho	Inês Gonçalves	Rubén Correia	Rafael Afonso	Lucas Heitor	Joana Lamela	Maria Leonor Santos
Miguel Cristovinho	Tomás Barateiro	Matilde Branco	Rita Gomes	Beatriz Laranjeira	Rafael & Marion	Alice Martins
Miguel Cristovinho	Afonso Mendes	Marco Pereira	Eugénia Silva	Aridane Teixeira		
Cuca Roseta						
Cuca Roseta	Lara Martins	Carlos Abreu	Laura Fernambuco	Miguel Moura	Luísa Pimentel	Francisca Queiroz
Cuca Roseta	Tomé Barros	Diana Brites	Francisca Carvalho	Alice Esménio	Isabel Luis	Mariana Portugal
Cuca Roseta	Maria Quintans	Alexandra Serban	Laura Tomás			
Note: Bold names are recipients of the 'super pass'.

== Blind auditions ==
Same as the previous two seasons, in the blind auditions (Provas Cegas), each coach was given two superblocks to use and prevent another coach from pitching for the artist. The superblock buttons could be used at any time until the artist has finished their audition. Additionally, each coach could use one 'super pass', which defaults the artist to their team and sends the artist directly to the live shows (Galas em Direto).

At the end of the blind auditions, Diogo did not use his second superblock. Additionally, Cuca did not fill all spots on her team, being one artist short at the conclusion of the blind auditions.

Blind auditions colour key
✔	Coach pressed the "EU QUERO" button
	Artist joined this coach's team
	Artist was eliminated with no coach pressing their button
	Artist received a 'super pass' and was defaulted to this coach's team
✘	Coach lost the chance to pitch for this artist after another coach's 'super pass'
✘	Coach presed the button "EU QUERO", but was:
	Blocked by Diogo; Blocked by Nena; Blocked by Cristo; Blocked by Cuca

=== Episode 1 (6 April) ===
First episode's results
Order	Artist	Song	Coach's and artist's choices			
Order	Artist	Song	Diogo	Nena	Cristo	Cuca
1	Francisca Pena	"Almost There"	✔	✔	✔	✔
2	Daniel Luz	"Sol de Inverno"	–	–	–	–
3	Maria Leonor Santos	"Grito"	✔	–	✔	–
4	Rubén Correia	"My Way"	✔	✔	✔	✔
5	Marta Dias	"Os Croquetes Acabam"	–	✔	–	–
6	Ana Líria	"Esperança"	–	–	–	–
7	Francisca Queiroz	"Ponto de Luz"	✔	✔	✔	✔
8	Leandro Souza	"Prometo"	✔	–	✔	–
9	Benedita Rocha	"Baby"	–	–	–	–
10	Lara Martins	"Pie Jesu"	✔	✔	✔	✔
11	Maria Alves	"You Are the Reason"	–	–	–	–
12	Rafael Afonso	"Don't Stop Me Now"	✘	✔	✔^{1}	✘

- ^1 After Diogo had super-blocked Cuca, and Cristo had super-blocked Diogo, Nena super-blocked Cristo, however the rules of the season state that only two blocks are permitted per blind audition, making Cristo eligible again.

=== Episode 2 (13 April) ===
Second episode's results
Order	Artist	Song	Coach's and artist's choices			
Order	Artist	Song	Diogo	Nena	Cristo	Cuca
1	Ana Fão	"Não Me Importo"	–	–	–	–
2	Guilherme Azevedo	"Quero é Viver"	✔	–	✔	–
3	Beatriz Faria	"Somewhere Over the Rainbow"	✔	✔	✔	✔
4	Nuno Coelho	"Melodia da Saudade"	–	–	–	–
5	Constança Machado	"Tudo Encontrarás"	–	✔	✔	✔
6	Matilde Branco	"I See Red"	✔	✔	✔	–
7	Margarida Dias	"Por Mim"	–	–	–	–
8	Isabel Pereira	"Passo a Passo"	✔	✔	✔	✔
9	Duarte Morais	"What Was I Made For?"	–	–	–	–
10	Francisca Santos	"Skyfall"	✔	–	✔	–
11	Filipa Nogueira	"Gosto de Ti"	–	✔	–	✔
12	Tomás Oliveira	"L-O-V-E"	–	–	–	–
13	Alice Martins	"Casa"	–	–	✔	–
14	Luca Monteiro	"True Colors"	✔	✔	✔	–

=== Episode 3 (20 April) ===
Third episode's results
Order	Artist	Song	Coach's and artist's choices			
Order	Artist	Song	Diogo	Nena	Cristo	Cuca
1	Laura Fernambuco	"All I Want"	✔	—	✔	✔
2	Aridane Teixeira	"Mon amour"	—	—	✔	✔
3	Sofia, Inês, Helena & Maria	"Foste Embora"	—	—	—	—
4	Isa Ferreira	"Can't Help Falling in Love"	✘	✔	—	—
5	Mariana Portugal	"Foi Deus"	✔	✔	✔	✔
6	Leandro Carriço	"Tal Como Sou"	—	—	—	—
7	Flor Cupido	"I'd Rather Be Me"	—	✔	—	—
8	Eugénia Silva	"A Bela e o Monstro"	—	—	✔	—
9	Leticia Notari	"Wrecking Ball"	—	—	—	—
10	Lucas Heitor	"Para Os Braços Da Minha Mãe"	—	✘	✔	—
11	Vasco Nava	"Não Há Estrelas No Céu"	—	—	—	—
12	Gabriela Pereira	"Favorite Crime"	✔	—	✔	✔
13	Inês Gonçalves	"À Janela"	✘	✘	✔	✘

=== Episode 4 (27 April) ===
Fourth episode's results
Order	Artist	Song	Coach's and artist's choices			
Order	Artist	Song	Diogo	Nena	Cristo	Cuca
1	Tomé Barros	"Estrela do Mar"	✔	✔	✔	✔
2	Luísa Pimentel	"Blackbird"	—	—	✔	✔
3	Vasco Mendinhas	"Breakin' Dishes"	✔	✔	✘	✔
4	Joana Rovisco	"Do Meu Ao Teu Correio"	—	—	—	—
5	Pedro Parreira	"Gotinha de Água"	✔	✔	✔	—
6	Laura Tomás	"Train Wreck"	—	—	—	✔
7	Núria Balça	"Longe Do Mundo"	—	—	—	—
8	Sofia Caeiro	"1 Step Forward, 3 Steps Back"	✔	—	✔	—
9	Rafael & Marion	"Die with a Smile"	—	—	✔	—
10	Lara Ferreira	"All I Ask"	—	—	—	—
11	Matilde Azevedo	"Não Faz Mal Não Estar Bem"	✘	✔	✘	—
12	Íris Ribeiro	"Uma Casa Portuguesa"	—	—	—	—
13	Carlos Abreu	"Como Antes"	✔	✔	✔	✔

=== Episode 5 (11 May) ===
Fifth episode's results
Order	Artist	Song	Coach's and artist's choices			
Order	Artist	Song	Diogo	Nena	Cristo	Cuca
1	Inês Soares	"Ai coração"	—	—	—	—
2	Tomás Barateiro	"Mãe"	✔	✔	✔	—
3	Diana Gracia	"Fly Me to the Moon"	✔	—	—	—
4	Matilde Santana	"Lembras-te de Mim?"	—	—	—	—
5	João Oliveira	"Another Love"	—	✔	✔	—
6	Zoé Veiga	"Birds of a Feather"	✔	—	✔	—
7	Dalila Ganhão	"Footloose"	—	—	—	—
8	Maria Quintans	"Sr. Extraterrestre"	✔	✔	✔	✔
9	Afonso Mendes	"The Show Must Go On"	—	✔	✔	—
10	Eva Santos	"Nuvem"	—	✔	—	—
11	Isabela Pita	"Mamma Mia"	—	—	—	—
12	Martim Ferreira	"Que O Amor Te Salve Nesta Noite Escura"	✔	—	—	—
13	Violeta Amorim	"No Time to Die"	✔	✔	✔	✔

=== Episode 6 (25 May) ===
Sixth episode's results
Order	Artist	Song	Coach's and artist's choices			
Order	Artist	Song	Diogo	Nena	Cristo	Cuca
1	Alice Esménio	"Popular"	—	✘	✔	✔
2	Bárbara Califórnia	"Creep"	—	✔	✔	—
3	Isabel Luis	"Amor Ladrão"	—	—	—	✔
4	Prince Sanhá	"Casa"	—	—	—	—
5	Mathilde Hill Elbert	"Writing's on the Wall"	—	✔	✔	—
6	Matilde & Santiago	"Coisas no Silêncio"	✔	—	—	—
7	Rodrigo Gil	"Castelo de Beja"	—	—	—	—
8	Beatriz Laranjeira	"Take On Me"	—	✔	✔	—
9	Leonor Domingos	"Good Luck, Babe!"	—	✔	—	—
10	Madalena Alves	"Outros Planos"	—	✔	✔	✔
11	Áyman Bahmankhan	"Flowers"	—	—	—	—
12	Diana Brites	"Dernière danse"	—	—	—	✔
13	Miguel Moura	"Menina Estás à Janela"	—	✘	✘	✔

=== Episode 7 (1 June) ===
Seventh episode's results
Order	Artist	Song	Coach's and artist's choices			
Order	Artist	Song	Diogo	Nena	Cristo	Cuca
1	Francisca Rodrigues	"Voilà"	—	—	—	—
2	Maria Vinagre	"Anyone"	✔	✘	✘	✘
3	Matilde Branco	"Rosa"	—	—	✔	—
4	Francisca Carvalho	"Someone like You"	—	✘	✔	✔
5	Dinis Rebordão	"Te Amo"	—	—	—	—
6	Mariana Capacho	"Que O Amor Te Salve Nesta Noite Escura"	✔	—	—	—
7	Sara Mendes	"That's So True"	Team full	✔	✔	✔
8	Martin Fernandes	"Sonhos de Menino"	Team full	Team full	—	—
9	Joana Lamela	"Skinny Love"	Team full	Team full	✔	—
10	Larissa Rossete	"Trevo (Tu)"	Team full	Team full	—	—
11	Rita Gomes	"Defying Gravity"	Team full	Team full	✔	✔
12	Alexandra Serban	"No Teu Poema"	Team full	Team full	—	✔
13	Marco Pereira	"Enter Sandman"	Team full	Team full	✔	✔

== Battles ==
In the battles (Batalhas), each coach pairs three of their artists up with only one winner to move on to the live shows (Team Cuca had one less battle and had one quintet with two winners due to the team having one less member). Like last season, there are no steals this season.

Battles colour key
Artist won the battle and advanced to the live shows
Artist lost the battle and was eliminated

=== Episode 8 (15 June) ===
Eighth episode's results
Order	Coach	Winner	Songs	Losers
1	Cuca	Carlos Abreu	"Loucamente"	Maria Quintans
1	Cuca	Carlos Abreu	"Loucamente"	Mariana Portugal
2	Diogo	Luca Monteiro	"Falling"	Zoé Veiga
2	Diogo	Luca Monteiro	"Falling"	Matilde Branco
3	Cristo	Lucas Heitor	"Loucos"	Marco Pereira
3	Cristo	Lucas Heitor	"Loucos"	Aridane Teixeira
4	Nena	Filipa Nogueira	"Não Vás Embora, Rapaz!"	Francisca Pena
4	Nena	Filipa Nogueira	"Não Vás Embora, Rapaz!"	Marta Dias
5	Cuca	Laura Fernambuco	"Always Remember Us This Way"	Francisca Carvalho
5	Cuca	Laura Fernambuco	"Always Remember Us This Way"	Diana Brites
6	Diogo	Diana Gracia	"A Terra Gira"	Matilde & Santiago
6	Diogo	Diana Gracia	"A Terra Gira"	Leandro Souza
7	Cristo	Rubén Correia	"Someone You Loved"	Alice Martins
7	Cristo	Rubén Correia	"Someone You Loved"	Rafael & Marion
8	Nena	Isabel Pereira	"Avião De Papel"	Constança Machado
8	Nena	Isabel Pereira	"Avião De Papel"	Eva Santos
9	Diogo	Beatriz Faria	"What About Us"	Gabriela Pereira
9	Diogo	Beatriz Faria	"What About Us"	Vasco Mendinhas
10	Cristo	Maria Leonor Santos	"Bohemian Rhapsody"	Rita Gomes
10	Cristo	Maria Leonor Santos	"Bohemian Rhapsody"	Beatriz Laranjeira

=== Episode 9 (22 June) ===
Ninth episode's results
Order	Coach	Winner	Songs	Losers
1	Nena	Isa Ferreira	"Ao Teu Ouvido"	Madalena Alves
1	Nena	Isa Ferreira	"Ao Teu Ouvido"	Pedro Parreira
2	Cristo	Rafael Afonso	"Lose Control"	Tomás Barateiro
2	Cristo	Rafael Afonso	"Lose Control"	Afonso Mendes
3	Cuca	Francisca Queiroz	"Tudo O Que Eu Te Dou"	Tomé Barros
3	Cuca	Francisca Queiroz	"Tudo O Que Eu Te Dou"	Laura Tomás
4	Diogo	Sofia Caeiro	"I Love You, I'm Sorry"	Mariana Capacho
4	Diogo	Sofia Caeiro	"I Love You, I'm Sorry"	Francisca Santos
5	Cristo	Joana Lamela	"Balada do Desajeitado"	Eugénia Silva
5	Cristo	Joana Lamela	"Balada do Desajeitado"	Matilde Branco
6	Nena	João Oliveira	"Slow It Down"	Flor Cupido
6	Nena	João Oliveira	"Slow It Down"	Mathilde Hill Elbert
7	Diogo	Martim Ferreira	"A Paixão"	Violeta Amorim
7	Diogo	Martim Ferreira	"A Paixão"	Guilherme Azevedo
8	Nena	Bárbara Califórnia	"Traitor"	Sara Mendes
8	Nena	Bárbara Califórnia	"Traitor"	Leonor Domingos
9	Cuca	Luísa Pimentel	"A Million Dreams"	Isabel Luis
9	Cuca	Lara Martins	"A Million Dreams"	Alexandra Serban
9	Cuca	Lara Martins	"A Million Dreams"	Alice Esménio

== Semifinals ==
This season, for the first time in the program's history, the semifinals are pre-recorded with coaches selecting which artists from his/her team will advance to the live final.

Semifinals colour key
Artist saved by their coach and advanced to the live final
Artist was eliminated

=== Episode 10: Semifinal 1 (29 June) ===
The twelve artists performed "Maria Joana" to start off the show.

Tenth episode's results
Order	Coach	Artist	Song	Result
1	Miguel Cristovinho	Maria Leonor Santos	"Andorinhas"	Eliminated
2	Miguel Cristovinho	Rafael Afonso	"Beautiful Things"	Eliminated
3	Miguel Cristovinho	Rubén Correia	"Feeling Good"	Safe
4	Cuca Roseta	Miguel Moura	"No Teu Poema"	Eliminated
5	Cuca Roseta	Laura Fernambuco	"When We Were Young"	Eliminated
6	Cuca Roseta	Carlos Abreu	"Meu Fado Meu"	Safe
7	Diogo Piçarra	Beatriz Faria	"What Was I Made For?"	Eliminated
8	Diogo Piçarra	Martim Ferreira	"Para os Braços da Minha Mãe"	Safe
9	Diogo Piçarra	Diana Gracia	"Number One Girl"	Eliminated
10	Nena	Isabel Pereira	"Dois Dedos de Testa"	Eliminated
11	Nena	Bárbara Califórnia	"Where Is My Mind?"	Eliminated
12	Nena	Matilde Azevedo	"Haja o Que Houver"	Safe

=== Episode 11: Semifinal 2 (6 July) ===
The twelve artists performed "Gosto de Ti" to start off the show.

Eleventh episode's results
Order	Coach	Artist	Song	Result
1	Miguel Cristovinho	Joana Lamela	"Scars to Your Beautiful"	Eliminated
2	Miguel Cristovinho	Inês Gonçalves	"Um Dia Hei de Voltar"	Safe
3	Miguel Cristovinho	Lucas Heitor	"Olá Solidão"	Eliminated
4	Diogo Piçarra	Sofia Caeiro	"Unwritten"	Eliminated
5	Diogo Piçarra	Luca Monteiro	"Ninguém é de Ninguém"	Eliminated
6	Diogo Piçarra	Maria Vinagre	"Rise Up"	Safe
7	Cuca Roseta	Francisca Queiroz	"Peito"	Eliminated
8	Cuca Roseta	Lara Martins	"Con te partirò"	Safe
9	Cuca Roseta	Luísa Pimentel	"Queda do Império"	Eliminated
10	Nena	João Oliveira	"Arcade"	Safe
11	Nena	Filipa Nogueira	"Tudo para Dar"	Eliminated
12	Nena	Isa Ferreira	"Lovely"	Eliminated

== Live final ==
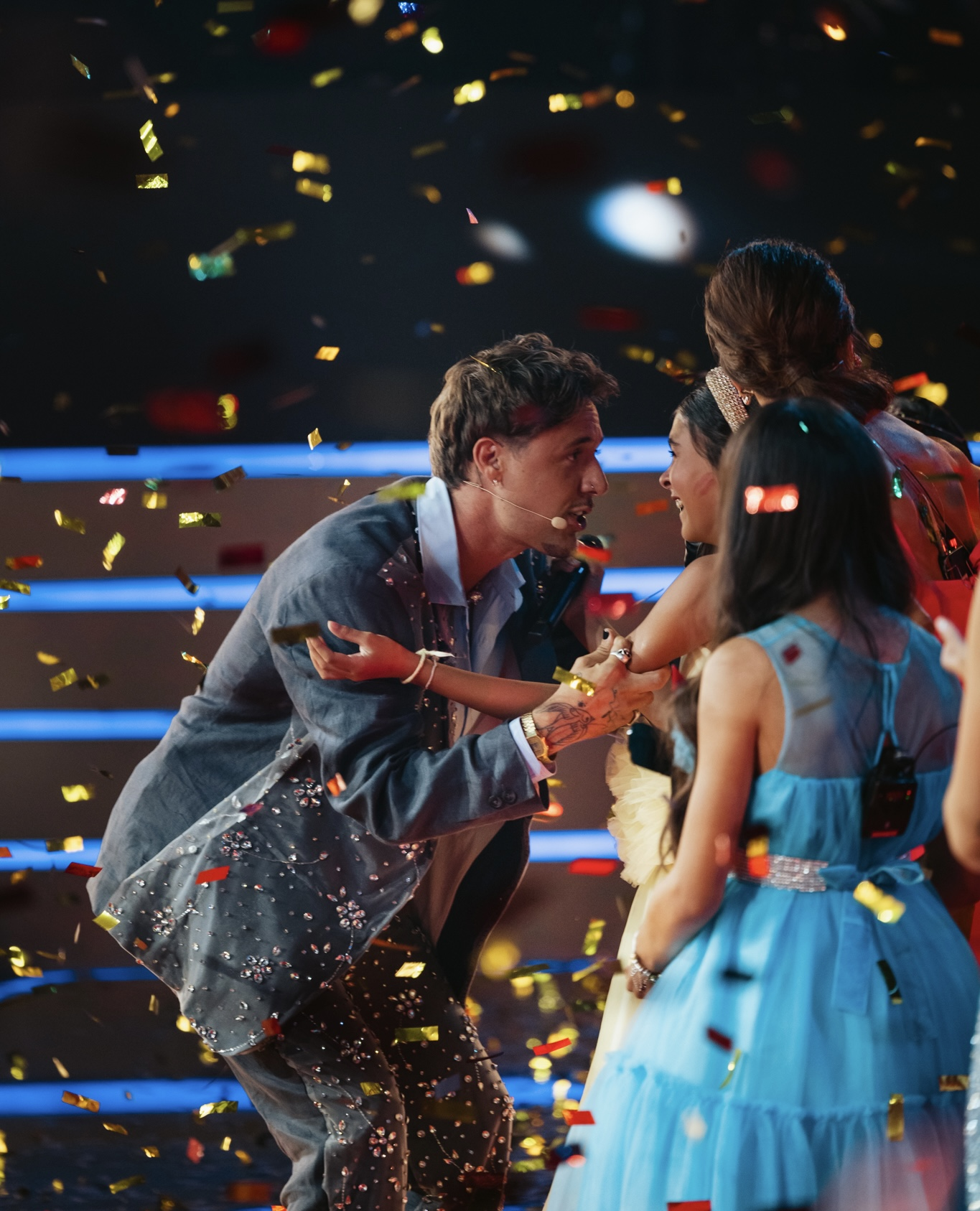
Coach Miguel Cristovinho joins Gonçalves on stage upon the announcement of her win

The live final commenced on 13 July 2025. In the first round, the final eight artists perform for one spot on their respective team to qualify for the second round based on the public's vote. In the second round, the top four artists perform their blind audition songs with one being declared the winner of the season at the end of the episode. At the end of the episode, Inês Gonçalves was announced as the winner of the season, marking Miguel Cristovinho's first win as a coach. Gonçalves automatically became Portugal's entry in the Junior Eurovision Song Contest 2025 following her win.

Final colour key round one
Artist saved by the public and advanced to round two
Artist was eliminated

Final colour key round two
Artist finished as the winner of the season
Artist finished as a runner-up of the season

=== Episode 12 (13 July) ===
The eight artists performed "Deslocado" with last season's winner Victoria Nicole to start off the show.

Final results
Round	Order	Coach	Artist	Song	Result
First (Top 8)	1	Cuca Roseta	Lara Martins	"O mio babbino caro"	Finalist
First (Top 8)	2	Diogo Piçarra	Maria Vinagre	"Chandelier"	Finalist
First (Top 8)	3	Nena	João Oliveira	"Homem do Leme"	Eliminated
First (Top 8)	4	Miguel Cristovinho	Inês Gonçalves	"Rosa Albardeira"	Finalist
First (Top 8)	5	Diogo Piçarra	Martim Ferreira	"Rosa Sangue"	Eliminated
First (Top 8)	6	Cuca Roseta	Carlos Abreu	"Ó Gente da Minha Terra"	Eliminated
First (Top 8)	7	Miguel Cristovinho	Rubén Correia	"Listen"	Eliminated
First (Top 8)	8	Nena	Matilde Azevedo	"O Amor A Portugal"	Finalist
Second (Top 4)	1	Cuca Roseta	Lara Martins	"Pie Jesu"	Runner-up
Second (Top 4)	2	Diogo Piçarra	Maria Vinagre	"Anyone"	Runner-up
Second (Top 4)	3	Miguel Cristovinho	Inês Gonçalves	"À Janela"	Winner
Second (Top 4)	4	Nena	Matilde Azevedo	"Não Faz Mal Não Estar Bem"	Runner-up

Additional performances
Order	Performers	Song
12.1	Miguel Cristovinho & his artists (Inês Gonçalves and Rubén Correia)	"Casa"
12.2	Cuca Roseta & her artists (Carlos Abreu and Lara Martins)	"Canção do Mar"
12.3	Nena & her artists (Matilde Azevedo and João Oliveira)	"portas do sol"
12.4	Diogo Piçarra & his artists (Maria Vinagre and Martim Ferreira)	"Amor de Ferro"
12.5	Mickael Carreira, Anselmo Ralph, and Toy	"Beijo"

== Elimination chart ==
Teams colour key

- Team Diogo
- Team Nena
- Team Cristo
- Team Cuca

Results colour key

- Winner
- Runner-up
- Safe
- Eliminated

Results per week
Artist	Week 1	Week 2	Week 3	
Artist	Week 1	Week 2	Round 1	Round 2
Inês Gonçalves	—N/a	Safe	Safe	Winner
Lara Martins	—N/a	Safe	Safe	Runner-up
Maria Vinagre	—N/a	Safe	Safe	Runner-up
Matilde Azevedo	Safe	—N/a	Safe	Runner-up
Martim Ferreira	Safe	—N/a	Eliminated	
João Oliveira	—N/a	Safe	Eliminated	
Rubén Correia	Safe	—N/a	Eliminated	
Carlos Abreu	Safe	—N/a	Eliminated	
Sofia Caeiro	—N/a	Eliminated		
Luca Monteiro	—N/a	Eliminated		
Isa Ferreira	—N/a	Eliminated		
Filipa Nogueira	—N/a	Eliminated		
Lucas Heitor	—N/a	Eliminated		
Joana Lamela	—N/a	Eliminated		
Luísa Pimentel	—N/a	Eliminated		
Francisca Queiroz	—N/a	Eliminated		
Beatriz Faria	Eliminated			
Diana Gracia	Eliminated			
Bárbara Califórnia	Eliminated			
Isabel Pereira	Eliminated			
Rafael Afonso	Eliminated			
Maria Leonor Santos	Eliminated			
Laura Fernambuco	Eliminated			
Miguel Moura	Eliminated			
