= Albania in the Junior Eurovision Song Contest 2025 =

- Junior Eurovision Song Contest 2025
- Participating broadcaster: Radio Televizioni Shqiptar (RTSH)
- Country: Albania
- Selection process: Festivali i 63-të Mbarëkombëtar i Këngës për Fëmijë
- Selection date: 1 June 2025

Competing entry
- Song: "Fruta perime"
- Artist: Kroni Pula
- Songwriters: Adrian Hila

Placement
- Final result: 6th, 145 points

Participation chronology

Albania was represented at the Junior Eurovision Song Contest 2025 with the song "Fruta perime", written by Adrian Hila and performed by Kroni Pula. The Albanian participating broadcaster, Radio Televizioni Shqiptar (RTSH), organised the national final Festivali i 63-të Mbarëkombëtar i Këngës për Fëmijë in order to select its entry for the contest.

== Background ==
Prior to the 2025 contest, Radio Televizioni Shqiptar (RTSH) had participated in the Junior Eurovision Song Contest representing Albania ten times since its first entry in the 2012 contest. Albania has never won the contest, with their best result being in 2015, when Mishela Rapo represented the country with "Dambaje", placing 5th. The nation opted not to take part in the contest in 2013 and 2014, and in 2020 (due to the COVID-19 pandemic). In 2024, Nikol Çabeli competed for Albania with the song "Vallëzoj", which ended up in 7th place with 126 points.

== Before Junior Eurovision ==
=== Festivali i 63-të Mbarëkombëtar i Këngës për Fëmijë ===
Festivali i 63-të Mbarëkombëtar i Këngës për Fëmijë was the sixty-third edition of Festivali i Këngës për Fëmijë, the national final format used by RTSH to select Albanian entries for the Junior Eurovision Song Contest. Twenty-nine finalists — divided into the "Junior" and "Young" categories — were selected by a jury panel composed of music industry professionals and announced on 30 May 2025, with the winner of the "Junior" category being selected as the national entry for the Junior Eurovision Song Contest.

The winner of the competition – which took place from 29 May to 1 June 2025 at the "Migjeni" Theathre in Shkodër, hosted by Edona Reshitaj and Erdit Asllanaj, and broadcast on RTSH1, RTSH Muzikë and Radio Tirana 1 – was determined by the combination of votes from a professional jury (50%) and a children's jury (50%), with the final also seeing several acts receive special awards for their participation. These included the prize for best vocals to Tara Fejzullahu, Eslin Kurti and Nivis Sulishti.

Kroni Pula, born in Tirana, was declared the winner of "Junior" category, with the song "Fruta perime". In addition to the competing entries, the guest performers included Nikol Çabeli (Albania Junior Eurovision 2024 entry), Alis Kallaçi, Myfarete Laze, Robert Radoja and Inva Mula.

Participants: Junior artists
Artist	Song	Songwriter(s)
Amina Zegullaj	"Mësuesja e parë"	Enis Mullaj; Eriona Rushiti
Anila Mahmudi	"Botë e re"	Gent Myftaraj; Qamil Aliu
Armantja Balla and Marin Kerri	"Ej Aj"	Edmond Rrapi; Sander Marra
Ea Zoga	"Mirësi"	Denis Taraj; Eriona Rushiti
Eslin Kurti	"Me fat unë jam"	Enis Mullaj; Eriona Rushiti
Greis Zeka	"Festa e fëmijëve"	Hamit Skilja; Sabrina Zeka
Hera Hoxha	"Valët e zemrës"	Alfred Çapaliku; Kolec Gajtani
Ilenia Llanaj	"Bota e fëmijëve"	Adrian Dermyshi; Leidi Shqiponja
Ivana Gjurbavija	"Si një sirenë"	Endri Muçaj; Enis Mullaj
Jasemin Çaku	"Nënë të thërrasin"	Bardhyl Hysa; Dritëro Agolli
Kejsi Sinani	"Shqip frymo"	Darina Prifti; Ilirian Zdrava
Kristel Metkaj	"Ndriçoj"	Sokol Marsi
Kroni Pula	"Fruta perime"	Adrian Hila
Marvin Myshketa	"Luaj me fëmijërinë"	Dilan Reka; Jeris Kaso; Oriola Kuçi
Nivis Sulishti	"Me hënën"	Nivis Sulishti; Sokol Marsi
Prishila Puka	"Si një fishekzjarr"	Shpetim Saraçi; Turjan Hysko
Roslin Krate	"Heroi jam unë"	Endrit Shani
Rozafa Maka	"Kam emrin si kështjella"	Alfred Çapaliku; Zef Çoba
Tara Fejzullahu	"Bye bye bye"	Florent Boshnjaku
Tea Kashta and Elia Fezjaj	"Jemi brezi që po vjen"	Jetmir Mehmedaj; Suela Tukaj

Participants: Young artists
Artist	Song	Songwriter(s)
Aiden Balla	"Do lejleku akullore"	Mimoza Tola; Ylli Ramzoti
Ajris Shehu	"Ku pe çoni këtë planet"	Suela Tukaj
Asel Dilaveri and Arbias Hallunaj	"Vëllai sherraxhi"	Gjovalin Ndoja; Zaim Merkulaj
Drini Drishti	"Dua"	Ismet Drishti
Enid Nika	"Këngët e vendit tim"	Ardit Nika; Naser Kraja
Maria Kalaja	"Ja çfarë bëri bubi im"	Aulon Kalaja; Ylli Kalaja
Mia Shkenza	"Legjenda"	Frederik Ndoci
Noara Daci	"Ne te tre"	Fjona Zoga; Ilir Zoga
Serena Turhani	"Nëpër ëndrra"	Alfred Kaçinari; Ana Kaçinari

==== Shows ====
Night 1 – 29 May 2025
R/O	Artist	Song	Category
1	Kejsi Sinani	"Shqip frymo"	Junior
2	Roslin Krate	"Heroi jam unë"	Junior
3	Ivana Gjurbavija	"Si një sirenë"	Junior
4	Jasemin Çaku	"Nënë të thërrasin"	Junior
5	Ajris Shehu	"Ku pe çoni këtë planet"	Young
6	Drini Drishti	"Dua"	Young
7	Maria Kalaja	"Ja çfarë bëri bubi im"	Young
8	Mia Shkenza	"Legjenda"	Young
9	Enid Nika	"Këngët e vendit tim"	Young
10	Kristel Metkaj	"Ndriçoj"	Junior
11	Prishila Puka	"Si një fishekzjarr"	Junior
12	Eslin Kurti	"Me fat unë jam"	Junior
13	Armantja Balla and Marin Kerri	"Ej Aj"	Junior
14	Ea Zoga	"Mirësi"	Junior

Night 2 – 30 May 2025
R/O	Artist	Song	Category
1	Greis Zeka	"Festa e fëmijëve"	Junior
2	Ilenia Llanaj	"Bota e fëmijëve"	Junior
3	Nivis Sulishti	"Me hënën"	Junior
4	Tea Kashta and Elia Fezjaj	"Jemi brezi që po vjen"	Junior
5	Tara Fejzullahu	"Bye bye bye"	Junior
6	Serena Turhani	"Nëpër ëndrra"	Young
7	Aiden Balla	"Do lejleku akullore"	Young
8	Noara Daci	"Ne te tre"	Young
9	Asel Dilaveri and Arbias Hallunaj	"Vëllai sherraxhi"	Young
10	Hera Hoxha	"Valët e zemrës"	Junior
11	Amina Zegullaj	"Mësuesja e parë"	Junior
12	Anila Mahmudi	"Botë e re"	Junior
13	Kroni Pula	"Fruta perime"	Junior
14	Rozafa Maka	"Kam emrin si kështjella"	Junior
15	Marvin Myshketa	"Luaj me fëmijërinë"	Junior

Key: Winner Second place Third place

Final Young Category – 1 June 2025
R/O	Artist	Song	Place
1	Ajris Shehu	"Ku po e çoni këtë planet"	—N/a
2	Drini Drishti	"Dua"	2
3	Maria Kalaja	"Ja çfarë bëri bubi im"	1
4	Mia Shkenza	"Legjenda"	—N/a
5	Enid Nika	"Këngët e vendit tim"	—N/a
6	Serena Turhani	"Nëpër ëndrra"	—N/a
7	Aiden Balla	"Do lejleku akullore"	3
8	Noara Daci	"Ne te tre"	—N/a
9	Asel Dilaveri and Arbias Hallunaj	"Vëllai sherraxhi"	—N/a

Final Junior Category – 1 June 2025
R/O	Artist	Song	Place
1	Kejsi Sinani	"Shqip frymo"	—N/a
2	Gresi Zeka	"Festa e fëmijëve"	—N/a
3	Anila Mahmudi	"Botë e re"	—N/a
4	Marvin Myshketa	"Luaj me fëmijërinë"	—N/a
5	Elia Fejzaj and Tea Kashta	"Jemi brezi që po vjen"	—N/a
6	Hera Hoxha	"Valët e zemrës"	—N/a
7	Nivis Sulishti	"Me hënën"	—N/a
8	Prishila Puka	"Si një fishekzjarr"	3
9	Amina Zegullaj	"Mësuesja e parë"	—N/a
10	Kroni Pula	"Fruta perime"	1
11	Rozafa Maka	"Kam emrin si kështjella"	—N/a
12	Eslin Kurti	"Me fat unë jam"	—N/a
13	Tara Fejzullahu	"Bye bye bye"	—N/a
14	Ea Zoga	"Mirësi"	2
15	Armantja Balla and Marin Kerri	"Ej Aj"	—N/a
16	Jasemin Çaku	"Nënë të thërrasin"	—N/a
17	Ilenia Llanaj	"Bota e fëmijëve"	—N/a
18	Roslin Krate	"Heroi jam unë"	—N/a
19	Ivana Gjurbavija	"Si një sirenë"	—N/a
20	Kristel Metkaj	"Ndriçoj"	—N/a

== At Junior Eurovision ==
The Junior Eurovision Song Contest 2025 took place at the Gymnastic Hall of Olympic City in Tbilisi, Georgia on 13 December 2025. On 4 November 2025, an allocation draw was held to determine the running order of the contest, ahead of which each song was classified into a different category based on its musical style and tempo. Albania was drawn to perform in position 18, performing last, following the entry from the France .

=== Voting ===
The same voting system that was introduced in the 2017 edition will be used, where the results will be determined by 50% online voting and 50% jury voting. Every participating broadcaster assembles a national jury that consists of three music industry professionals and two children aged between 10 and 15 who are citizens of the country they represent. The rankings of those jurors are combined to make an overall top ten.

The online voting consists of two phases. The first phase of the online voting will begin on 12 December 2025 when a recap of all the rehearsal performances is shown on the contest's website Junioreurovision.tv before the viewers can vote. After this, voters will also have the option to watch longer one-minute clips from each participant's rehearsal. This first round of voting will end on 13 December at 16:59 CET. The second phase of the online voting will take place during the live show and begin right after the last performance and will be open for 15 minutes. International viewers will be able to vote for three songs. They will also be able to vote for their own country's song. These votes will then be turned into points which will be determined by the percentage of votes received. For example, if a song receives 10% of the votes, it will receive 10% of the available points.

At the end of the show, Albania received 60 points from juries and 85 points from online voting, placing 6th.

Points awarded to Albania
Score	Country
12 points	France
10 points	Azerbaijan
8 points	Ukraine
7 points	
6 points	Spain
5 points	Georgia; Netherlands; Portugal
4 points	Montenegro
3 points	Croatia
2 points	Poland
1 point	
Albania received 85 points from the online vote

Points awarded by Albania
Score	Country
12 points	France
10 points	Georgia
8 points	Armenia
7 points	Portugal
6 points	Poland
5 points	Ukraine
4 points	North Macedonia
3 points	Malta
2 points	Azerbaijan
1 point	Netherlands

==== Detailed voting results ====
The following members comprised the Albanian jury:

- Enis Mulla
- Blerta Ristani
- Eriona Rushiti
- Ea Zoga
- Marina Daka

Detailed voting results from Albania
Draw	Country	Juror A	Juror B	Juror C	Juror D	Juror E	Rank	Points
01	Malta	16	6	9	5	15	8	3
02	Azerbaijan	10	4	10	12	14	9	2
03	Croatia	17	15	14	14	12	16	
04	San Marino	14	5	12	13	9	14	
05	Armenia	1	1	1	15	2	3	8
06	Ukraine	9	8	5	9	4	6	5
07	Ireland	11	17	16	6	11	15	
08	Netherlands	7	10	7	16	10	10	1
09	Poland	4	9	6	8	7	5	6
10	North Macedonia	13	11	15	3	5	7	4
11	Montenegro	8	7	11	10	13	12	
12	Italy	15	14	8	4	17	11	
13	Portugal	5	12	4	7	6	4	7
14	Spain	6	13	13	11	8	13	
15	Georgia	2	2	2	2	3	2	10
16	Cyprus	12	16	17	17	16	17	
17	France	3	3	3	1	1	1	12
18	Albania							
