= Ivo Gonçalves =

Portuguese footballer (born 1984)

Personal information
- Full name: Ivo Filipe Claudino da Palma Gonçalves
- Date of birth: 6 May 1984 (age 42)
- Place of birth: Silves, Portugal
- Height: 1.86 m (6 ft 1 in)
- Position: Goalkeeper

Team information
- Current team: Várzea Douro

Youth career
- 1994–2002: Silves

Senior career*
Years	Team	Apps	(Gls)
2002–2005	Silves	33	(0)
2005–2006	Vitória Setúbal B	25	(0)
2006–2007	Portimonense	3	(0)
2007–2008	Silves		
2008–2010	Lagoa	54	(0)
2010–2013	Portimonense	24	(0)
2013–2014	Farense	39	(0)
2014–2015	Académico Viseu	37	(0)
2015–2019	Penafiel	98	(1)
2017	→ Académico Viseu (loan)	2	(0)
2019–2020	Leixões	11	(0)
2020–2022	Vizela	26	(0)
2022–2024	Länk Vilaverdense	34	(0)
2024	→ Felgueiras 1932 (loan)	0	(0)
2024–2025	Cinfães	15	(0)
2025–	Várzea Douro	25	(0)
- * Club domestic league appearances and goals as of 10:21, 2 April 2026 (UTC)

Ivo Filipe Claudino da Palma Gonçalves (born 6 May 1984) is a Portuguese professional footballer who plays as a goalkeeper for ADC Várzea do Douro.

== Club career ==
Born in Silves, Algarve, Gonçalves appeared in 238 matches in the Segunda Liga, representing Portimonense SC (two spells), S.C. Farense, Académico de Viseu FC (twice), F.C. Penafiel, Leixões SC, F.C. Vizela and Länk FC Vilaverdense. He made his debut in the competition on 27 August 2006, in a 0–1 home loss against C.D. Santa Clara.

On 6 December 2015, playing for Penafiel, Gonçalves scored from his goal in an eventual 3–2 defeat away to Santa Clara. He contributed 19 games as Vizela returned to the Primeira Liga at the end of the 2020–21 season after an absence of 36 years, but subsequently played second-fiddle to newly signed Charles Silva as well as Pedro Silva.

Gonçalves made his only appearance in the top flight in the last match of 2021–22 campaign, with his team already safe from relegation; the 38-year-old started in the 4–1 loss at Moreirense F.C. on 14 May, with the opposition in turn avoiding an immediate drop and being forced to take part in the relegation play-off.

After achieving second-tier promotion with Vilaverdense in 2022–23, Gonçalves renewed his contract. On 22 January 2024, he returned to the Liga 3 on a five-month loan to F.C. Felgueiras 1932.

Gonçalves signed for amateurs C.D. Cinfães in August 2024.

== Personal life ==
Gonçalves' daughter, Inês, represented Portugal at the Junior Eurovision Song Contest 2025.
