= Portugal in the Eurovision Song Contest 2026 =

- Eurovision Song Contest 2026
- Participating broadcaster: Rádio e Televisão de Portugal (RTP)
- Country: Portugal
- Selection process: Festival da Canção 2026
- Selection date: 7 March 2026

Competing entry
- Song: "Rosa"
- Artist: Bandidos do Cante
- Songwriters: Duarte Farias; Francisco Pereira; Francisco Pestana; Francisco Raposo; Gonçalo Narciso; Gui Alface; José Carlos Coelho Almeida Tavares; Luis Aleixo; Miguel Costa

Placement
- Semi-final result: Failed to qualify (12th)

Participation chronology

Portugal was represented at the Eurovision Song Contest 2026 with the song "Rosa", written by Duarte Farias, Francisco Pereira, Francisco Pestana, Francisco Raposo, Gonçalo Narciso, Gui Alface, José Carlos Coelho Almeida Tavares, Luis Aleixo, and Miguel Costa, and performed by the group Bandidos do Cante. The Portuguese participating broadcaster, Rádio e Televisão de Portugal (RTP), selected its entry during the traditional national selection competition Festival da Canção.

== Background ==
Prior to the 2026 contest, Radiotelevisão Portuguesa (RTP) until 2003, and Rádio e Televisão de Portugal (RTP) since 2004, have participated in the Eurovision Song Contest representing Portugal fifty-six times since their first entry in 1964. They had won the contest on one occasion: in 2017 with the song "Amar pelos dois" performed by Salvador Sobral. Since the introduction of semi-finals to the format of the contest in 2004, Portugal has thus far managed to qualify to the final on nine occasions, the latest being in 2025, when "Deslocado" performed by Napa ultimately placed 21st in the final.

As part of its duties as participating broadcaster, RTP organises the selection of its entry in the Eurovision Song Contest and broadcasts the event in the country. The broadcaster had traditionally selected its entry for the contest via the music competition Festival da Canção, with exceptions in 1988 and 2005 when the entries were internally selected. RTP confirmed its participation in the 2026 contest on 4 December 2025, having previously announced that the winner of the 60th edition of Festival da Canção would "be eligible to represent Portugal" at the contest on 16 September 2025.

== Before Eurovision ==
=== Festival da Canção 2026 ===
Festival da Canção 2026 was the 60th edition of Festival da Canção. Sixteen entries competed in the festival, which consisted of two semi-finals held on 21 and 28 February 2026, leading to a ten-song final on 7 March 2026. All three shows were broadcast on RTP1, RTP África, RTP Ásia, RTP América, and RTP Internacional as well as on radio via Antena 1 and online via RTP Play.

==== Format ====
The format of the competition consisted of three shows: two semi-finals and a final. Each semi-final featured eight competing entries from which five advanced from each show to complete the ten-song lineup in the final. Results during the semi-finals were determined by the votes from a jury panel appointed by RTP and public televoting; the first four qualifiers were based on the 50/50 combination of jury and public voting where both streams of voting assigned points from 1–8, 10 and 12 based on ranking, while the fifth qualifier was determined by a second round of public televoting from the remaining entries. Results during the final were determined by the 50/50 combination of votes from seven regional juries and public televoting. Both the public televote and the juries assigned points from 1–8, 10, and 12 based on the ranking developed by both streams of voting.

==== Competing entries ====
Sixteen composers were selected by RTP through four methods: eight from direct invitation from RTP, six from selected from 660 submissions received through an open call, one from the invitation of Napa, the 2025 winners, and one from the winner of Prova de Acesso. The composers, which both created the songs and selected its performers, were required to submit the demo and final versions of their entries by 31 October and 30 November 2025, respectively. Songs could be submitted in any language. The selected composers were revealed on 12 November 2025, while the competing artists were revealed on 22 January 2026.

Artist	Song	Songwriter(s)	Selection
Agridoce	"Onde quero estar"	Joana Banza; Margarida Castanheira; Pedro Agostinho; Sofia Jorge; Tiago Alves	Open call winner
André Amaro	"Dá-me a tua mão"	André Amaro	Invited by RTP
Bandidos do Cante	"Rosa"	Duarte Farias; Francisco Pereira; Francisco Pestana; Francisco Raposo; Gonçalo Narciso; Gui Alface; José Carlos Coelho Almeida Tavares; Luis Aleixo; Miguel Costa	Invited by RTP
Bateu Matou	"Nos teus olhos"	Joaquim Albergaria; Ivo Costa; Rui Pité	Invited by RTP
Dinis Mota	"Jurei"	Dinis Mota	Prova de Acesso winner
Evaya	"Sprint"	Beatriz Bronze; Guilherme Firmino; Joao Valente	Invited by RTP
Francisco Fontes	"Copiloto"	Francisco Fontes	Open call winner
Gonçalo Gomes	"Doce ilusão"	Bernardo Almeida; Gonçalo Gomes; João Umbelino; Pedro Fernandes	Open call winner
Inês Sousa	"Um filme ao contrário"	António Vasconcelos Dias; Inês Sousa; João Correia	Invited by RTP
Jacaréu and Ana Margarida	"O-pi-ni-ão"	Jorge Gonçalves	Open call winner
João Ribeiro	"Canção do querer"	André Henriques; Cristina Branco; Luís Figueiredo	Invited by RTP
Mário Marta	"Pertencer"	Alberto Koenig; Jorge "Djodje" Almeida	Invited by RTP
Marquise	"Chuva"	Mafalda Matos; Matias Ferreira; Miguel Azevedo; Miguel Pereira	Invited by RTP
Nunca Mates o Mandarim	"Fumo"	João Amorim; João Cabral Campello; Manuel Dinis	Invited by Napa
Sandrino	"Disposto a tudo"	Francesco Meoli; Sandrino Costa	Open call winner
Silvana Peres	"Não tem fim"	Rita Dias	Open call winner

==== Semi-finals ====
The semi-finals took place on 21 and 28 February 2026. In each show, eight entries competed, with five advancing to the final. The voting consisted of two rounds: a 50/50 combination of votes from an expert jury and a public televote determined the first four qualifiers, and a second round of televoting selected the fifth and final qualifier. The jury consisted of Diana Vilarinho, Joana Espadinha, Lena d'Água, Mário Rui Vieira and Tó Cruz (represented Portugal in 1995)

Key: Jury and televote round qualifier Televote-only round qualifier

Semi-final 1 – First round – 21 February 2026
R/O	Artist	Song	Jury	Televote	Total	Place
1	Dinis Mota	"Jurei"	7	10	17	2
2	Nunca Mates o Mandarim	"Fumo"	12	12	24	1
3	Evaya	"Sprint"	10	5	15	4
4	André Amaro	"Dá-me a tua mão"	5	6	11	5
5	Bateu Matou	"Nos teus olhos"	6	3	9	7
6	Marquise	"Chuva"	8	8	16	3
7	Agridoce	"Onde quero estar"	4	7	11	6
8	Mário Marta	"Pertencer"	3	4	7	8

Semi-final 1 – Second round – 21 February 2026
Artist	Song	Place
Agridoce	"Onde quero estar"	2
André Amaro	"Dá-me a tua mão"	1
Bateu Matou	"Nos teus olhos"	3
Mário Marta	"Pertencer"	4

Semi-final 2 – First round – 28 February 2026
R/O	Artist	Song	Jury	Televote	Total	Place
1	Gonçalo Gomes	"Doce ilusão"	7	7	14	5
2	Silvana Peres	"Não tem fim"	8	8	16	3
3	Sandrino	"Disposto a tudo"	6	10	16	4
4	Francisco Fontes	"Copiloto"	3	5	8	8
5	Bandidos do Cante	"Rosa"	5	12	17	1
6	Jacaréu and Ana Margarida	"O-pi-ni-ão"	4	6	10	7
7	João Ribeiro	"Canção do querer"	12	4	16	2
8	Inês Sousa	"Um filme ao contrário"	10	3	13	6

Semi-final 2 – Second round – 28 February 2026
Artist	Song	Place
Francisco Fontes	"Copiloto"	3
Gonçalo Gomes	"Doce ilusão"	1
Inês Sousa	"Um filme ao contrário"	4
Jacaréu and Ana Margarida	"O-pi-ni-ão"	2

==== Final ====
The final took place on 7 March 2026 and featured the ten qualified entries. The winner was determined by a 50/50 combination of the vote by a three-member regional jury representing the seven Portuguese territorial regions and a public vote; in the event of a tie, the public voting was to take precedence.

Final – 7 March 2026
R/O	Artist	Song	Jury		Televote	Total	Place
R/O	Artist	Song	Votes	Points	Televote	Total	Place
1	Bandidos do Cante	"Rosa"	56	10	12	22	1
2	João Ribeiro	"Canção do querer"	65	12	2	14	4
3	André Amaro	"Dá-me a tua mão"	21	1	7	8	7
4	Gonçalo Gomes	"Doce ilusão"	34	4	3	7	9
5	Marquise	"Chuva"	33	3	5	8	8
6	Evaya	"Sprint"	31	2	1	3	10
7	Sandrino	"Disposto a tudo"	40	7	6	13	5
8	Nunca Mates o Mandarim	"Fumo"	51	8	8	16	3
9	Silvana Peres	"Não tem fim"	35	5	4	9	6
10	Dinis Mota	"Jurei"	40	6	10	16	2

Detailed regional jury votes
R/O	Song	North	Central	Lisbon Area	Alentejo	Algarve	Madeira	Azores	Total
1	"Rosa"	12	8	12	12	8	2	2	56
2	"Canção do querer"	10	12	5	10	6	10	12	65
3	"Dá-me a tua mão"	2	7	7	2	1	1	1	21
4	"Doce ilusão"	1	10	10	4	2	4	3	34
5	"Chuva"	7	1	1	3	10	7	4	33
6	"Sprint"	3	6	2	1	5	6	8	31
7	"Disposto a tudo"	5	2	6	7	12	3	5	40
8	"Fumo"	8	5	8	8	4	12	6	51
9	"Não tem fim"	6	3	3	5	3	5	10	35
10	"Jurei"	4	4	4	6	7	8	7	40

==== Official album ====
Cover art of the official compilation album

Festival da Canção 2026 is the official compilation album of the contest. It was compiled by Universal Music Portugal and was digitally released by the former on 22 January 2026. The album features the 16 participating entries of the contest.

Chart performance for Festival da Canção 2026
Chart (2026)	Peak position
Portuguese Albums (AFP)	185

==== Controversy over Israeli participation ====
Israel's participation in the Eurovision Song Contest has been controversial since 2024 due to the Gaza war. In 2026, broadcasters from five countries, namely Iceland, Ireland, the Netherlands, Slovenia, and Spain, opted not to take part in the contest after the European Broadcasting Union (EBU) allowed Israel to compete, following a vote held in December 2025 in favour of adopting a series of amendments to the voting system, bypassing a proposed separate vote on Israel's participation. Before the vote, in September 2025, RTP announced that the winner of Festival da Canção 2026, unlike previous editions, would not be obligated to represent Portugal in Eurovision. After the EBU's decision to permit Israel's presence, 11 out of 16 participants of Festival da Canção 2026 signed an open letter on 10 December 2025, confirming that they would not represent Portugal if they win, due to Israel's participation. Later, two participants also announced that they will not be competing in Eurovision should they win the Portuguese selection. Of the remaining contestants, two confirmed they would still represent Portugal if selected, including eventual winner Bandidos do Cante, while one did not issue a definitive statement.

== At Eurovision ==
The Eurovision Song Contest 2026 took place at the Wiener Stadthalle in Vienna, Austria, and consisted of two semi-finals held on the respective dates of 12 and 14 May and the final on 16 May 2026. All nations with the exceptions of the host country and the "Big Four" (France, Germany, Italy and the United Kingdom) were required to qualify from one of two semi-finals in order to compete for the final; the top ten countries from each semi-final progressed to the final. On 12 January 2026, an allocation draw was held to determine which of the two semi-finals, as well as which half of the show, each country performed in; the European Broadcasting Union (EBU) split up the competing countries into different pots based on voting patterns from previous contests, with countries with favourable voting histories put into the same pot.

=== Semi final ===
Portugal was allocated for the first semi final, and later, was announced to perform in position five during the show. Shortly after, the qualification–announcement segment took place, and, at the end of the segment Portugal was not announced as one of the ten qualifiers, therefore, Portugal would not move on onto the final, for the first time since 2019.

=== Voting ===
Below is a breakdown of points awarded to Portugal during the first semi-final. Voting during the three shows involved each country awarding two sets of points from 1-8, 10 and 12: one from their professional jury and the other from televoting. The exact composition of the professional jury, and the results of each country's jury and televoting were released after the final; the individual results from each jury member were also released in an anonymised form. The Portuguese jury consisted of Cláudia Pascoal, who represented Portugal in the Eurovision Song Contest 2018, Joana Espadinha, Paulo Castelo, Pedro Granger, and Rita Guerra, who represented Portugal in the Eurovision Song Contest 2003.

==== Points awarded to Portugal ====
Points awarded to Portugal (Semi-final 1)
Score	Televote	Jury
12 points		
10 points		
8 points	Estonia	Poland
7 points		Lithuania
6 points		
5 points	Croatia; San Marino	Belgium; Serbia
4 points	Belgium; Lithuania	Israel
3 points	Finland	Sweden
2 points	Germany; Montenegro; Sweden	Estonia; Italy; Montenegro
1 point		Finland

==== Points awarded by Portugal ====
Points awarded by Portugal (Semi-final 1)
Score	Televote	Jury
12 points	Israel	Finland
10 points	Moldova	Poland
8 points	Serbia	Croatia
7 points	Finland	Lithuania
6 points	Poland	Serbia
5 points	Croatia	Sweden
4 points	Montenegro	Belgium
3 points	Greece	Montenegro
2 points	Lithuania	Israel
1 point	Estonia	Greece

Points awarded by Portugal (Final)
Score	Televote	Jury
12 points	Israel	Albania
10 points	Ukraine	Denmark
8 points	Moldova	Croatia
7 points	Romania	Finland
6 points	Bulgaria	Poland
5 points	Finland	France
4 points	Australia	Germany
3 points	Italy	Ukraine
2 points	France	Norway
1 point	Croatia	Romania

==== Detailed voting results ====
The following members comprised the Portuguese jury:

- Beatriz Câmara Fonseca
- Carolina Pires Gonçalves
- Jorge Fernando
- Luís Gustavo Paixão
- Mário Rui Vieira
- Matilde Maria Almeida
- Pedro Miguel Mimoso

Detailed voting results from Portugal (Semi-final 1)
R/O	Country	Jury									Televote	
R/O	Country	Juror A	Juror B	Juror C	Juror D	Juror E	Juror F	Juror G	Rank	Points	Rank	Points
01	Moldova	10	11	13	7	8	5	11	11		2	10
02	Sweden	8	5	10	9	4	4	1	6	5	12	
03	Croatia	9	2	9	2	2	3	3	3	8	6	5
04	Greece	3	10	14	5	14	12	13	10	1	8	3
05	Portugal											
06	Georgia	11	13	12	13	13	10	14	14		13	
07	Finland	1	3	2	1	5	8	8	1	12	4	7
08	Montenegro	7	9	8	8	7	9	7	8	3	7	4
09	Estonia	12	12	3	14	12	13	9	13		10	1
10	Israel	14	14	6	4	11	14	4	9	2	1	12
11	Belgium	13	8	5	11	10	2	2	7	4	11	
12	Lithuania	4	1	7	3	6	7	5	4	7	9	2
13	San Marino	6	6	11	12	9	11	10	12		14	
14	Poland	5	7	1	10	1	1	6	2	10	5	6
15	Serbia	2	4	4	6	3	6	12	5	6	3	8

Detailed voting results from Portugal (Final)
R/O	Country	Jury									Televote	
R/O	Country	Juror A	Juror B	Juror C	Juror D	Juror E	Juror F	Juror G	Rank	Points	Rank	Points
01	Denmark	7	6	2	10	1	18	1	2	10	11	
02	Germany	14	14	4	14	19	6	3	7	4	22	
03	Israel	20	25	3	15	25	13	25	17		1	12
04	Belgium	12	5	6	11	15	15	5	11		24	
05	Albania	1	4	5	4	17	5	2	1	12	15	
06	Greece	22	24	25	6	21	25	9	19		12	
07	Ukraine	15	20	1	12	18	4	17	8	3	2	10
08	Australia	8	21	11	19	4	8	12	14		7	4
09	Serbia	4	7	14	16	16	7	11	13		14	
10	Malta	11	22	10	21	10	21	7	18		21	
11	Czechia	21	8	7	3	9	12	21	12		16	
12	Bulgaria	10	17	21	18	7	24	23	20		5	6
13	Croatia	3	1	8	2	8	10	13	3	8	10	1
14	United Kingdom	25	23	22	20	22	23	15	25		23	
15	France	17	19	9	5	2	1	18	6	5	9	2
16	Moldova	13	16	19	22	20	22	20	24		3	8
17	Finland	5	11	13	1	6	2	22	4	7	6	5
18	Poland	2	2	12	9	13	3	16	5	6	13	
19	Lithuania	16	18	18	13	11	17	19	22		20	
20	Sweden	18	15	15	23	5	9	14	16		17	
21	Cyprus	24	9	17	25	23	20	8	21		19	
22	Italy	9	12	16	17	14	14	6	15		8	3
23	Norway	6	3	20	8	12	11	10	9	2	18	
24	Romania	23	13	23	7	3	16	4	10	1	4	7
25	Austria	19	10	24	24	24	19	24	23		25	
