= Buba Espinho =

Portuguese singer (born 1995)

- Born: Bernardo Ramos Ribeiro Ferraz Espinho; 24 May 1995 (age 31); Beja, Portugal
- Genres: Fado; Cante Alentejano
- Occupations: Singer; songwriter
- Instrument: Vocals

Bernardo Ramos Ribeiro Ferraz "Buba" Espinho (born 24 May 1995) is a Portuguese singer and songwriter. Alongside António Zambujo and Luís Trigacheiro, he is one of the most highly regarded singers from Alentejo.

== Early life ==
Espinho is the son of the composer of the unusual hit "As Meninas da Ribeira do Sado" - a song by Adiafa -, Luís Espinho, and Maria Rosa Martins Ramos Ribeiro Ferraz Espinho (who passed away in 2023). He comes from a family of artists; the son of a musician and a pianist grandmother, he has been familiar with music since a very young age, especially with Cante Alentejano, a type of traditional music from the Baixo Alentejo region, where Espinho comes from.

== Career ==
Espinho took his first steps in music with Cante Alentejano by joining several groups, such as Os Adiafa, A Moda da Mãe, Os Bubedanas, Mestre Cante and Há Lobos sem Ser Serra. A vast journey that, by 2016, and already assuming his place as a fado singer, led him to win the Grande Noite do Fado at the Coliseu dos Recreios, becoming one of the great promises of the Portuguese musical scene.

After winning the Grande Noite do Fado, Espinho decided to start his solo career. Since then, he has been a regular guest in shows by big names in Portuguese music: Rui Veloso, António Zambujo, Ana Moura, Celina da Piedade, Júlio Resende, among many others.

From Beja, Espinho went to Lisbon, passing through the city's most iconic Fado Houses, from Faia to Casa de Linhares, from Clube do Fado to Adega Machado, and from there to the main national stages, with memorable performances at the NOS Alive Festival, the Coliseu de Lisboa, Coliseu do Porto, Casa da Música, Centro Cultural de Belém, Ovibeja, and many more. Besides Portugal, Buba is pursuing a career that is expected to be international, performing in countries such as England, Timor-Leste, Spain, Canada, Switzerland, and France.

In 2020, Espinho released his first studio album. The album includes "Roubei-te Um Beijo", which features Zambujo on the single and in the video. In addition to this song, the album features Raquel Tavares.

In 2023, the band D.A.M.A released the hit song "Casa", featuring Buba Espinho, in homage to Cante Alentejano. In the same year, Espinho released the song "Ao Teu Ouvido", with Bárbara Tinoco. The following year, he participated in the Festival da Canção 2024, with the song "Farol", finishing in sixth place.

== Personal life ==
As a result of his relationship with Ana Carocinho, Esphino had a daughter, Maria Amália, born on 7 September 2023. The name chosen by the couple for their daughter was in honor of his paternal grandmother. After ten years of dating, Espinho and Carocinho separated in 2024.

== Discography ==
=== Studio albums ===
- Buba Espinho (2020)
- Voltar (2023)

=== Singles ===
==== As lead artist ====
- "Quem Sabe Um Dia" (2017)
- "Roubei-te Um Beijo", with António Zambujo (2020)
- "Ao Teu Ouvido", with Bárbara Tinoco (2023)
- "Um Dia Hei De Voltar", with Bandidos do Cante (2024)
- "É Tão Grande o Alentejo" (2024) - commemorating 10 years of Cante Alentejano as intangible cultural heritage by UNESCO
- "Não É Tarde Nem É Cedo", with Miguel Araújo (2025)

==== As featured artist ====
- "Casa", with D.A.M.A (2023)
- "Tu Na Tua", with ÁTOA and Luís Trigacheiro (2025)
- "Cidade", with Bluay (2026)
