= Cante Alentejano =

Polyphonic singing from Alentejo, southern Portugal

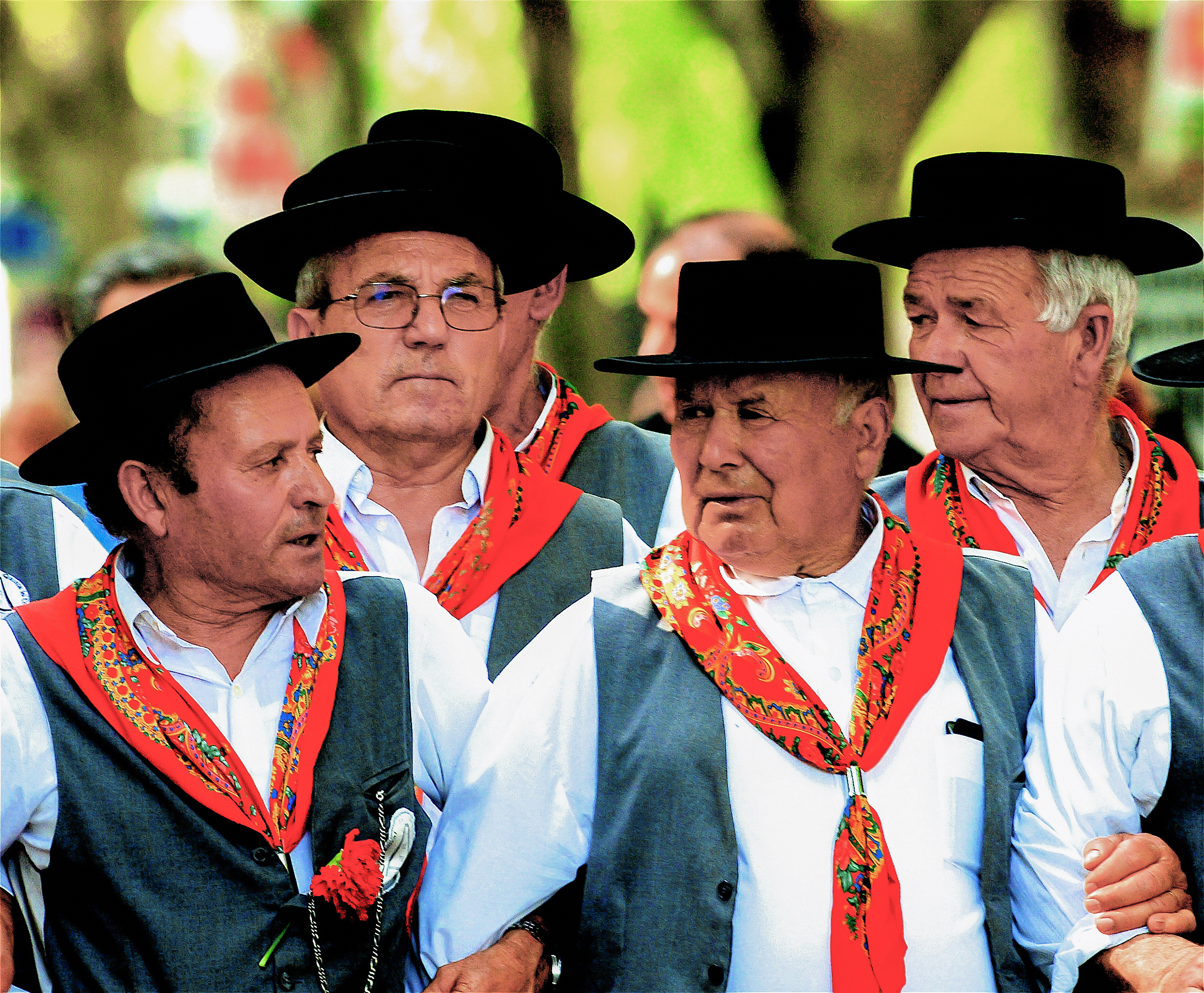
- A traditional group of Cante Alentejano
- Stylistic origins: Portuguese music
- Typical instruments: Human voice

Local scenes
- Alentejo

Cante Alentejano, polyphonic singing from Alentejo, southern Portugal
- UNESCO Intangible Cultural Heritage
- Country: Portugal
- Reference: 01007
- Region: Europe and North America

Inscription history
- Inscription: 2014 (9th session)
- List: Representative

Cante Alentejano is a Portuguese music genre based on vocal music without instrumentation from the Alentejo region. It was inscribed in 2014 in UNESCO's Representative List of the Intangible Cultural Heritage of Humanity, one of two Portuguese music traditions, the other being Fado. Its origins come from a similar popular music genre created in the region of Minde by campinos. It is said that the habit of singing without instruments was common in bull-herding as a means to coordinate efforts among the campinos.

== See also ==
- Alentejo
- Music of Portugal
