= D.A.M.A =

Portuguese pop band

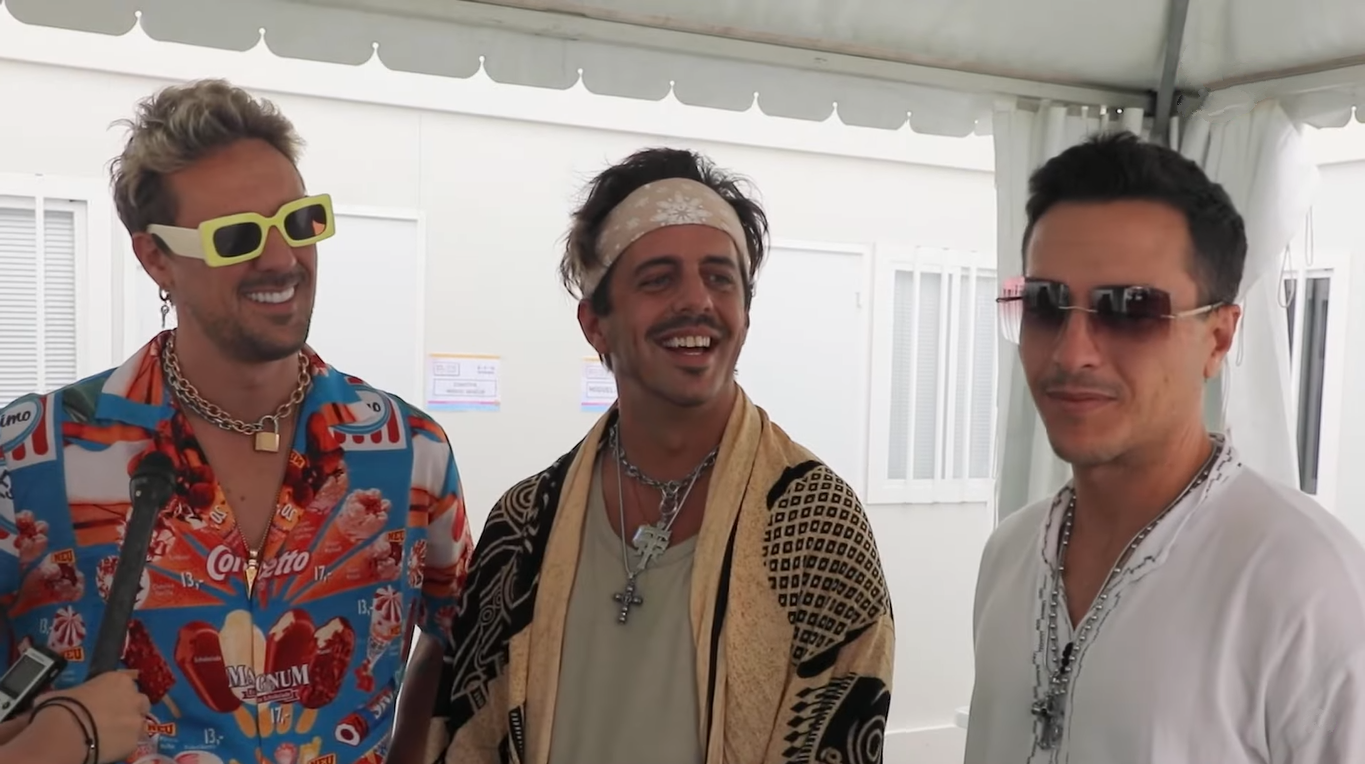
- D.A.M.A in 2023

Background information
- Origin: Portugal
- Genres: Pop, Pop Rap, Hip Hop, Electronic Pop, Reggae Pop
- Years active: 2008-present
- Label: Sony Music
- Members: Francisco "Kasha" Pereira (2008-present); Miguel Coimbra (2008-present); Miguel Cristovinho (2012-present)
- Past members: Filipa "Pipa" (2008-2012)

D.A.M.A (Portuguese pronunciation: [ˈdɐ.mɐ]), stylized as D.Δ.M.A or DAMA, acronym of Deixa-me Aclarar-te a Mente Amigo (English: "Let me Clear your Mind Friend"), is a Portuguese pop band from Lisbon.

== Discography ==
=== Albums ===
| Title | Details | Peak chart positions | Certifications |
| Title | Details | POR | Certifications |
|---|---|---|---|
| Uma questão de princípio | Released: 29 September 2014 (POR); Label: Sony Music | 1 | *AFP: 2× Platinum |
| Dá-me um segundo | Released: 23 October 2015 (POR); Label: Sony Music | 1 | *AFP: Platinum |
| Lado a lado | Released: 7 November 2017 (POR); Label: Sony Music | 2 | *AFP: Platinum |

=== Singles ===
List of singles, with selected details and chart positions
| Title | Year | Peak chart positions | Album |
| Title | Year | POR | Album |
|---|---|---|---|
| "Ás Vezes" | 2016 | 95 | Uma questão de princípio |
| "Era Eu" | 2016 | 24 | Non-album single(s) |
| "Agora É Tarde" | 2016 | 65 | Dá-me um segundo |
| "Não Dá" | 2016 | 55 | Dá-me um segundo |
| "Não Faço Questão" (featuring Gabriel O Pensador) | 2016 | 31 | Dá-me um segundo |
| "Tempo para Quê" (featuring Player) | 2016 | 35 | Dá-me um segundo |
| "Pensa bem" (featuring ProfJam) | 2017 | 68 | Lado a Lado |
| "Oquelávai" | 2017 | 51 | Lado a Lado |
"—" denotes a recording that did not chart or was not released in that territory.

== Awards and nominations ==
| Year | Award | Category | Result |
|---|---|---|---|
| 2015 | MTV Europe Music Award | Best Portuguese Act | Nominated |
| 2016 | MTV Europe Music Award | Best Portuguese Act | Nominated |
| 2016 | Nickelodeon Kids' Choice Awards | Favorite Portuguese Act | Won |
| 2015 | Golden Globes (Portugal) | Best Newcomer | Nominated |
| 2015 | Golden Globes (Portugal) | Best Group | Nominated |
| 2015 | Golden Globes (Portugal) | Best Song | Nominated |
| 2016 | Golden Globes (Portugal) | Best Song | Nominated |
| 2016 | Golden Globes (Portugal) | Best Group | Won |
| 2018 | Golden Globes (Portugal) | Best Group | Nominated |
