= Georgia in the Junior Eurovision Song Contest 2024 =

- Junior Eurovision Song Contest 2024
- Participating broadcaster: Georgian Public Broadcaster (GPB)
- Country: Georgia
- Selection process: Artist: Ranina; Song: Internal selection
- Selection date: Artist: 26 May 2024; Song: 13 October 2024

Competing entry
- Song: "To My Mom"
- Artist: Andria Putkaradze
- Songwriters: Giorgi Kukhianidze; Maka Davitaia

Placement
- Final result: 1st, 239 points

Participation chronology

Georgia was represented at the Junior Eurovision Song Contest 2024 with the song "To My Mom", written by Giorgi Kukhianidze and Maka Davitaia, and performed by Andria Putkaradze. The Georgian participating broadcaster, Georgian Public Broadcaster (GPB), selected Putkaradze as its representative through the children's talent show Ranina, while the song, which ultimately won the contest, was internally selected.

== Background ==
Prior to the 2024 contest, Georgia have participated in the Junior Eurovision Song Contest sixteen times since its debut in 2007, having never missed a contest since then. Georgia is also the most successful country in the competition, with three victories in 2008, 2011 and 2016.

In 2023, Anastasia Vasadze was selected to represent the country following her victory in the sixth season of Ranina, however it was later announced that she would be joined on stage by fellow Ranina finalists Nikoloz Kharati and Oto Bazerashvili, marking the first time Georgia was not represented by a soloist since 2015. The trio sang the song "Over the Sky", which ended up in 14th place out of 16 entries with 74 points.

== Before Junior Eurovision ==
=== Ranina ===
For the seventh year in a row, Georgia used an original children's talent show format, Ranina (Georgian: რანინა), as the selection method for their artist. GPB opened applications on 28 November 2023 and held castings in December to select the contestants. The final list of artists was revealed on 1 January 2024 on the official Facebook page of Ranina, publishing ten videos where the family of the contestants broke the news to them on New Year's Eve.

Classical pianist Datuna Aladashvili was the main host of the seventh season of Ranina, a role that he has held since the first season. During the shows, former contestant Vache Ghviniashvili joined him at the studio.

The format of Ranina remains unchanged from previous seasons, as all ten contestants compete across four thematic tours in the main round, where they perform accompanied by a live orchestra and famous singers or bands from Georgia. Each tour is divided in two episodes. Each time that they perform, the artists are rated by a three-member jury, who can award up to ten points to each artist in four categories: vocals, performance, artistry and involvement. All the scores are added up and, at the end of the fourth tour, the five artists with the highest scores advance to the semi-final. In the semi-final, the five artists are rated by the jury following the same system to select three finalists. The winner of the final was also chosen by a three-member jury.

Every episode of the main round was broadcast on the First Channel of Georgia on Saturdays at 21:30 GET. As for the two final episodes, GPB broadcast them on the weekend of 25 and 26 May 2024 at 22:00 and 21:30 GET, setting the final to coincide with Georgian Independence Day. The two final episodes were also broadcast on Georgian Radio, alongside the regular broadcasts on the First Channel.

List of contestants
| Name | Main round scores | | | | | Semi-final | Final | Place |
| Name | Tour 1 | Tour 2 | Tour 3 | Tour 4 | Combined score | Semi-final | Final | Place |
|---|---|---|---|---|---|---|---|---|
| Andria Putkaradze (ანდრია ფუტკარაძე) | 117 | 120 | 120 | 120 | 477 | Qualified | Winner | 1 |
| Barbare Morgoshia (ბარბარე მორგოშია) | 116 | 120 | 120 | 120 | 476 | Qualified | Finalist | 2 |
| Sandro Gurgenadze (სანდრო გურგენაძე) | 118 | 120 | 120 | 120 | 478 | Qualified | Finalist | 2 |
| Andria Mishvelidze (ანდრია მიშველიძე) | 120 | 120 | 118 | 120 | 478 | Eliminated | Did not qualify | 4 |
| Sandro Ashotia (სანდრო აშოტია) | 118 | 120 | 120 | 119 | 477 | Eliminated | Did not qualify | 4 |
| Anastasia Imeradze (ანასტასია იმერაძე) | 119 | 120 | 120 | 115 | 474 | Did not qualify | | 6 |
| Ia Licheli (ია ლიჩელი) | 117 | 120 | 118 | 119 | 474 | Did not qualify | | 6 |
| Mate Martiashvili (მატე მარტიაშვილი) | 114 | 120 | 120 | 116 | 470 | Did not qualify | | 8 |
| Giorgi Shashiashvili (გიორგი შაშიაშვილი) | 113 | 120 | 120 | 115 | 468 | Did not qualify | | 9 |
| Marta Nozadze (მართა ნოზაძე) | 114 | 120 | 118 | 116 | 468 | Did not qualify | | 9 |

==== Tour 1 ====
In the first tour, the ten contestants covered songs by the Georgian composers Roma Rtskhiladze and Gia Macharashvili, joined on stage by past Ranina contestants. The first episode featured five songs by Rtskhiladze, who sat in the jury, and the second episode featured five songs by Macharashvili, who also joined the jury.

Show 1 – 23 March 2024
| R/O | Artist (Guest artists) | Song | Jury scores (Note: The categories for the scores, from left to right, are vocals, performance, artistry and involvement.) | | | Final score |
| R/O | Artist (Guest artists) | Song | D. Evgenidze | N. Metonidze | R. Rtskhiladze | Final score |
|---|---|---|---|---|---|---|
| 1 | Giorgi Shashiashvili (with Vache Ghviniashvili and Datuna Kereselidze) | "Ch'adrak'is dapa" "ჭადრაკის დაფა" | 39 (10 | 9 | 10 | 10) | 38 (10 | 9 | 10 | 9) | 36 (9 | 9 | 9 | 9) | 113 |
| 2 | Marta Nozadze (with Oto Bazerashvili) | "Nost'algia" "ნოსტალგია" | 39 (10 | 9 | 10 | 10) | 39 (10 | 9 | 10 | 10) | 36 (9 | 9 | 9 | 9) | 114 |
| 3 | Mate Martiashvili (with Nikoloz Kharati) | "Sheni tvalebis peri" "შენი თვალების ფერი" | 39 (10 | 9 | 10 | 10) | 39 (10 | 9 | 10 | 10) | 36 (9 | 9 | 9 | 9) | 114 |
| 4 | Barbare Morgoshia (with Mariam Gomiashvili, Barbare Makhatadze and Anastasia Masurashvili) | "Zghap'ari" "ზღაპარი" | 40 (10 | 10 | 10 | 10) | 39 (10 | 9 | 10 | 10) | 37 (9 | 10 | 9 | 9) | 116 |
| 5 | Andria Putkaradze (with Demetre Okriashvili, Barbare Makhatadze, Datuna Kereselidze, Anastasia Masurashvili and Mariam Gomiashvili) | "Varsk'vlavebi" "ვარსკვლავები" | 40 (10 | 10 | 10 | 10) | 40 (10 | 10 | 10 | 10) | 37 (10 | 9 | 9 | 9) | 117 |

Show 2 – 30 March 2024
| R/O | Artist (Guest artists) | Song | Jury scores | | | Final score |
| R/O | Artist (Guest artists) | Song | D. Evgenidze | N. Metonidze | G. Macharashvili | Final score |
|---|---|---|---|---|---|---|
| 1 | Andria Mishvelidze (with Anaroza Gaprindashvili) | "Iq'o da ara iq'o ra" "იყო და არა იყო რა" | 40 (10 | 10 | 10 | 10) | 40 (10 | 10 | 10 | 10) | 40 (10 | 10 | 10 | 10) | 120 |
| 2 | Ia Licheli (with Gabriel Lomsadze) | "Amaghldi sulo" "ამაღლდი სულო" | 39 (10 | 9 | 10 | 10) | 38 (10 | 9 | 9 | 10) | 40 (10 | 10 | 10 | 10) | 117 |
| 3 | Anastasia Iremadze (with Vache Ghviniashvili, Nikoloz Kharati, Oto Bazerashvili and Gega Shonia) | "Gaighime" "გაიღიმე" | 40 (10 | 10 | 10 | 10) | 39 (10 | 9 | 10 | 10) | 40 (10 | 10 | 10 | 10) | 119 |
| 4 | Sandro Gurgenadze (with Anastasia Vasadze) | "Shok'oladis ts'vima" "შოკოლადის წვიმა" | 40 (10 | 10 | 10 | 10) | 39 (10 | 9 | 10 | 10) | 39 (10 | 9 | 10 | 10) | 118 |
| 5 | Sandro Ashotia (with Mariam Bigvava) | "Midis ts'lebi" "მიდის წლები" | 39 (10 | 9 | 10 | 10) | 39 (10 | 9 | 10 | 10) | 40 (10 | 10 | 10 | 10) | 118 |

==== Tour 2 ====
In the second tour, the ten contestants covered Georgian classic songs accompanied by young Georgian musicians Giga Gigashvili and Beka Gochiashvili. The first episode of the tour featured Gigashvili on stage and Gochiashvili in the jury, and the roles reversed for the second episode.

Show 3 – 6 April 2024 (Guest artist: Giga Gigashvili)
| R/O | Artist | Song | Jury scores | | | Final score |
| R/O | Artist | Song | D. Evgenidze | N. Metonidze | B. Gochiashvili | Final score |
|---|---|---|---|---|---|---|
| 1 | Marta Nozadze | "Alionze gamighima Tbilisma" "ალიონზე გამიღიმა თბილისმა" | 40 (10 | 10 | 10 | 10) | 40 (10 | 10 | 10 | 10) | 40 (10 | 10 | 10 | 10) | 120 |
| 2 | Mate Martiashvili | "Me Tbilisis mot'rpiale var" "მე თბილისის მოტრფიალე ვარ" | 40 (10 | 10 | 10 | 10) | 40 (10 | 10 | 10 | 10) | 40 (10 | 10 | 10 | 10) | 120 |
| 3 | Giorgi Shashiashvili | "Minda gjerodes" "მინდა გჯეროდეს" | 40 (10 | 10 | 10 | 10) | 40 (10 | 10 | 10 | 10) | 40 (10 | 10 | 10 | 10) | 120 |
| 4 | Barbare Morgoshia | "Ch'aghara Tbiliso" "ჭაღარა თბილისო" | 40 (10 | 10 | 10 | 10) | 40 (10 | 10 | 10 | 10) | 40 (10 | 10 | 10 | 10) | 120 |
| 5 | Andria Putkaradze | "Chems simgheras vin gaigebs" "ჩემს სიმღერას ვინ გაიგებს" | 40 (10 | 10 | 10 | 10) | 40 (10 | 10 | 10 | 10) | 40 (10 | 10 | 10 | 10) | 120 |

Show 4 – 13 April 2024 (Guest artist: Beka Gochiashvili)
| R/O | Artist | Song | Jury scores | | | Final score |
| R/O | Artist | Song | D. Evgenidze | N. Metonidze | G. Gigashvili | Final score |
|---|---|---|---|---|---|---|
| 1 | Sandro Ashotia | "Toliebi" "თოლიები" | 40 (10 | 10 | 10 | 10) | 40 (10 | 10 | 10 | 10) | 40 (10 | 10 | 10 | 10) | 120 |
| 2 | Anastasia Iremadze | "Megobrebi" "მეგობრები" | 40 (10 | 10 | 10 | 10) | 40 (10 | 10 | 10 | 10) | 40 (10 | 10 | 10 | 10) | 120 |
| 3 | Andria Mishvelidze | "Lurji zghva" "ლურჯი ზღვა" | 40 (10 | 10 | 10 | 10) | 40 (10 | 10 | 10 | 10) | 40 (10 | 10 | 10 | 10) | 120 |
| 4 | Ia Licheli | "Ts'vims" "წვიმს" | 40 (10 | 10 | 10 | 10) | 40 (10 | 10 | 10 | 10) | 40 (10 | 10 | 10 | 10) | 120 |
| 5 | Sandro Gurgenadze | "Nu medzakhi" "ნუ მეძახი" | 40 (10 | 10 | 10 | 10) | 40 (10 | 10 | 10 | 10) | 40 (10 | 10 | 10 | 10) | 120 |

==== Tour 3 ====
The third tour was dedicated to Georgian folklore, as all ten contestants performed traditional songs alongside the ensemble Shavnabada.

Show 5 – 20 April 2024 (Guest artists: Shavnabada)
| R/O | Artist | Song | Jury scores | | | Final score |
| R/O | Artist | Song | D. Evgenidze | N. Metonidze | T. Tsiramua | Final score |
|---|---|---|---|---|---|---|
| 1 | Barbare Morgoshia | "Vagiorko ma" "ვაგიორქო მა" | 40 (10 | 10 | 10 | 10) | 40 (10 | 10 | 10 | 10) | 40 (10 | 10 | 10 | 10) | 120 |
| 2 | Mate Martiashvili | "Oghond shentan mamq'opina" "ოღონდ შენთან მამყოფინა" | 40 (10 | 10 | 10 | 10) | 40 (10 | 10 | 10 | 10) | 40 (10 | 10 | 10 | 10) | 120 |
| 3 | Andria Putkaradze | "Si ko uli bat'a" "სი ქო ული ბატა" | 40 (10 | 10 | 10 | 10) | 40 (10 | 10 | 10 | 10) | 40 (10 | 10 | 10 | 10) | 120 |
| 4 | Marta Nozadze | "Bat'onebo" "ბატონებო" | 40 (10 | 10 | 10 | 10) | 40 (10 | 10 | 10 | 10) | 38 (10 | 10 | 9 | 9) | 118 |
| 5 | Giorgi Shashiashvili | "Avara var" "ავარა ვარ" | 40 (10 | 10 | 10 | 10) | 40 (10 | 10 | 10 | 10) | 40 (10 | 10 | 10 | 10) | 120 |

Show 6 – 27 April 2024
| R/O | Artist | Song | Jury scores | | | Final score |
| R/O | Artist | Song | D. Evgenidze | N. Metonidze | T. Tsiramua | Final score |
|---|---|---|---|---|---|---|
| 1 | Sandro Ashotia | "Mtiuluri sat'rpialo" "მთიულური სატრფიალო" | 40 (10 | 10 | 10 | 10) | 40 (10 | 10 | 10 | 10) | 40 (10 | 10 | 10 | 10) | 120 |
| 2 | Andria Mishvelidze | "Mkholod shen erts" "მხოლოდ შენ ერთს" | 40 (10 | 10 | 10 | 10) | 39 (10 | 9 | 10 | 10) | 39 (9 | 10 | 10 | 10) | 118 |
| 3 | Anastasia Iremadze | "Kalav vin mogtsa mshveneba" "ქალავ ვინ მოგცა მშვენება" | 40 (10 | 10 | 10 | 10) | 40 (10 | 10 | 10 | 10) | 40 (10 | 10 | 10 | 10) | 120 |
| 4 | Ia Licheli | "Ase chonguri" "ასე ჩონგური" | 40 (10 | 10 | 10 | 10) | 39 (10 | 9 | 10 | 10) | 39 (10 | 10 | 9 | 10) | 118 |
| 5 | Sandro Gurgenadze (with Oto Bazerashvili) | "Chak'rulo" "ჩაკრულო" | 40 (10 | 10 | 10 | 10) | 40 (10 | 10 | 10 | 10) | 40 (10 | 10 | 10 | 10) | 120 |

==== Tour 4 ====
The fourth tour was themed as an international tour: the contestants performed songs in ten different languages chosen by Natia Okruashvili alongside a choir made up by past contestants from the six previous seasons of Ranina. The broadcast of the second half of the tour, initially set to be on 11 May, was pushed back by a week because of news coverage on the 2024 Georgian protests.

Show 7 – 4 May 2024
| R/O | Artist | Song | Jury scores | | | Final score |
| R/O | Artist | Song | D. Evgenidze | N. Metonidze | T. Rukhadze | Final score |
|---|---|---|---|---|---|---|
| 1 | Barbare Morgoshia | "Simba" | 40 (10 | 10 | 10 | 10) | 40 (10 | 10 | 10 | 10) | 40 (10 | 10 | 10 | 10) | 120 |
| 2 | Mate Martiashvili | "Blackbird" | 39 (10 | 9 | 10 | 10) | 39 (9 | 10 | 10 | 10) | 38 (9 | 9 | 10 | 10) | 116 |
| 3 | Giorgi Shashiashvili | "Al monte" | 39 (10 | 9 | 10 | 10) | 38 (10 | 9 | 10 | 9) | 38 (10 | 9 | 10 | 9) | 115 |
| 4 | Andria Putkaradze | "Cinema Paradiso" | 40 (10 | 10 | 10 | 10) | 40 (10 | 10 | 10 | 10) | 40 (10 | 10 | 10 | 10) | 120 |
| 5 | Marta Nozadze | "Malanka" "Маланка" | 39 (10 | 9 | 10 | 10) | 39 (10 | 9 | 10 | 10) | 38 (9 | 9 | 10 | 10) | 116 |

Show 8 – 18 May 2024
| R/O | Artist | Song | Jury scores | | | Final score |
| R/O | Artist | Song | D. Evgenidze | N. Metonidze | T. Rukhadze | Final score |
|---|---|---|---|---|---|---|
| 1 | Anastasia Iremadze | "Je ne veux pas travailler" | 39 (10 | 9 | 10 | 10) | 38 (10 | 9 | 9 | 10) | 38 (9 | 9 | 10 | 10) | 115 |
| 2 | Andria Mishvelidze | "Aquarela do Brasil" | 40 (10 | 10 | 10 | 10) | 40 (10 | 10 | 10 | 10) | 40 (10 | 10 | 10 | 10) | 120 |
| 3 | Sandro Gurgenadze | "Maa Tujhe Salaam" | 40 (10 | 10 | 10 | 10) | 40 (10 | 10 | 10 | 10) | 40 (10 | 10 | 10 | 10) | 120 |
| 4 | Ia Licheli | "Dandini" | 40 (10 | 10 | 10 | 10) | 40 (10 | 10 | 10 | 10) | 39 (10 | 10 | 10 | 9) | 119 |
| 5 | Sandro Ashotia | "Bridge over Troubled Water" | 39 (10 | 9 | 10 | 10) | 40 (10 | 10 | 10 | 10) | 40 (10 | 10 | 10 | 10) | 119 |

==== Semi-final ====
The semi-final took place on 25 May 2024. The vocal sextet The Bookmarks made up of six former Ranina contestants Anastasia Garsevanishvili, Barbare Imnadze, Marita Khvedelidze, Kato Chkaureli, Rati Gelovani and Soso Chachua joined the five qualified artists on stage performing songs by the classical composer Meri Davitashvili. Buka Kartozia, director of The Bookmarks and the person chosen to select the songs in the semi-final, also acted as the rotating juror in the episode next to Evgenidze and Metonidze.

Semi-final – 25 May 2024 (Guest artists: The Bookmarks)
| R/O | Artist | Song | Result |
|---|---|---|---|
| 1 | Sandro Ashotia | "P'at'ara mat'arebeli / "Chattanooga Choo Choo" "პატარა მატარებელი" | Eliminated |
| 2 | Sandro Gurgenadze | "Es sats'q'ali k'urdgheli" / "Somewhere Over the Rainbow" "ეს საწყალი კურდღელი" | Qualified |
| 3 | Andria Mishvelidze | "Ts'its'ilebi" / "Jadosnuri pleit'a" "წიწილები" / "ჯადოსნური ფლეიტა" | Eliminated |
| 4 | Barbare Morgoshia | "Iavnana" / "Mze shina" "იავნანა" / "მზე შინა" | Qualified |
| 5 | Andria Putkaradze | "Baghdaduri" "ბაღდადური" | Qualified |

==== Final ====
The final took place on 26 May 2024, coinciding with Georgian Independence Day. The artists that qualified from the semi-final covered Georgian patriotic songs originally written by the singer Gogi Dolidze, as arranged by the composer Zviad Bolkvadze. Orchestra conductor Nikoloz Rachveli was the rotating judge in the final alongside Evgenidze and Metonidze.

Final – 26 May 2024
| R/O | Artist | Song | Result |
|---|---|---|---|
| 1 | Sandro Gurgenadze | "Kartvelebis ertad q'opna damilotse ghmerto" "ქართველების ერთად ყოფნა დამილოცე ღმერთო" | Finalist |
| 2 | Barbare Morgoshia | "Nushi" "ნუში" | Finalist |
| 3 | Andria Putkaradze | "K'idevats daizrdebin" "კიდევაც დაიზრდებინ" | Winner |

=== Song selection ===
The song that Andria Putkaradze would perform in the contest was internally selected. The selected entry, titled "To My Mom", was revealed on 13 October.

== At Junior Eurovision ==
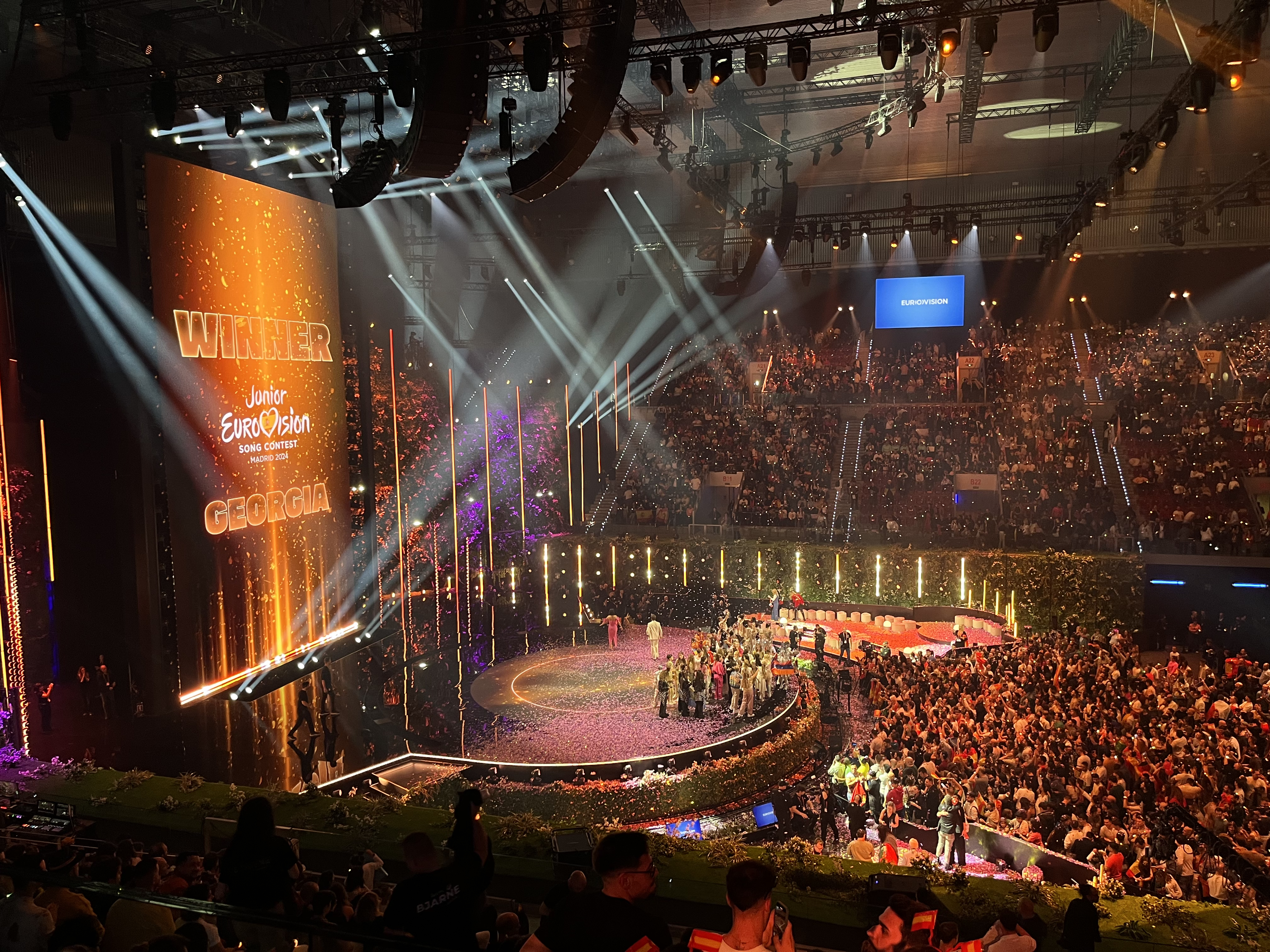
Participants onstage moments after Georgia's win

The Junior Eurovision Song Contest 2024 took place at Caja Mágica in Madrid, Spain on 16 November 2024. Georgia performed 9th, following Poland and preceding Spain.

=== Voting ===
The same voting system that was introduced in the 2017 edition was used, where the results were determined by 50% online voting and 50% jury voting. Every participating broadcaster assembled a national jury that consisted of three music industry professionals and two children aged between 10 and 15 who were citizens of the country they represented. The rankings of those jurors were combined to make an overall top ten.

The online voting consisted of two phases. The first phase of the online voting began on 15 November 2024 when a recap of all the rehearsal performances was shown on the contest's website Junioreurovision.tv before the viewers could vote. After this, voters also had the option to watch longer one-minute clips from each participant's rehearsal. This first round of voting ended on 16 November at 17:59 CET. The second phase of the online voting took place during the live show and began right after the last performance and was open for 15 minutes. International viewers were able to vote for three songs. They were also able to vote for their own country's song. These votes were then turned into points which were determined by the percentage of votes received. For example, if a song received 10% of the votes, it received 10% of the available points.

At the end of the show, Georgia received 180 points from juries and 59 points from online voting, winning the contest. This was Georgia's 4th victory, following their wins in 2008, 2011 and 2016, becoming the country with the most wins in the contest's history.

Points awarded to Georgia
| Score | Country |
|---|---|
| 12 points | Albania; Armenia; Cyprus; Estonia; Ireland; Italy; Malta; Netherlands; Portugal; San Marino; Spain; Ukraine |
| 10 points | Germany; North Macedonia |
| 8 points | France; Poland |
| 7 points | |
| 6 points | |
| 5 points | |
| 4 points | |
| 3 points | |
| 2 points | |
| 1 point | |
Georgia received 59 points from the online vote

Points awarded by Georgia
| Score | Country |
|---|---|
| 12 points | Armenia |
| 10 points | France |
| 8 points | Spain |
| 7 points | Portugal |
| 6 points | Malta |
| 5 points | Ukraine |
| 4 points | Ireland |
| 3 points | Netherlands |
| 2 points | Germany |
| 1 point | Estonia |

==== Detailed voting results ====
The following members comprised the Georgian jury:

- David Kereselidze
- Giorgi Shiolashvili
- Grigol Kipshidze
- Barbare Morgoshia
- Neli Sebiskveradze

Detailed voting results from Georgia
| Draw | Country | Juror A | Juror B | Juror C | Juror D | Juror E | Rank | Points |
|---|---|---|---|---|---|---|---|---|
| 01 | Italy | 11 | 6 | 13 | 10 | 10 | 11 | |
| 02 | Estonia | 6 | 10 | 14 | 6 | 9 | 10 | 1 |
| 03 | Albania | 12 | 14 | 11 | 16 | 7 | 13 | |
| 04 | Armenia | 1 | 1 | 1 | 1 | 1 | 1 | 12 |
| 05 | Cyprus | 15 | 13 | 15 | 13 | 8 | 14 | |
| 06 | France | 2 | 2 | 3 | 3 | 6 | 2 | 10 |
| 07 | North Macedonia | 14 | 11 | 9 | 9 | 15 | 12 | |
| 08 | Poland | 13 | 12 | 12 | 15 | 11 | 15 | |
| 09 | Georgia | | | | | | | |
| 10 | Spain | 3 | 3 | 10 | 11 | 2 | 3 | 8 |
| 11 | Germany | 10 | 7 | 4 | 12 | 12 | 9 | 2 |
| 12 | Netherlands | 7 | 16 | 5 | 2 | 13 | 8 | 3 |
| 13 | San Marino | 16 | 15 | 16 | 14 | 16 | 16 | |
| 14 | Ukraine | 9 | 4 | 6 | 7 | 5 | 6 | 5 |
| 15 | Portugal | 4 | 8 | 7 | 4 | 4 | 4 | 7 |
| 16 | Ireland | 5 | 9 | 8 | 8 | 3 | 7 | 4 |
| 17 | Malta | 8 | 5 | 2 | 5 | 14 | 5 | 6 |
