= To My Mom =

2024 song by Andria Putkaradze

Single by Andria Putkaradze
- Published: 13 October 2024
- Released: 22 October 2024
- Length: 2:58
- Label: Giga Studio Production; Universal Music Denmark
- Songwriters: Giorgi Kukhianidze; Maka Davitaia

Music video
- "To My Mom" on YouTube

Junior Eurovision Song Contest 2024 entry
- Country: Georgia
- Artist: Andria Putkaradze
- Language: Georgian
- Composer: Giorgi Kukhianidze
- Lyricists: Giorgi Kukhianidze; Maka Davitaia

Finals performance
- Final result: 1st
- Final points: 239

Entry chronology
- ◄ "Over the Sky" (2023)
- "Shine Like a Star" (2025) ►

Official performance video
- "To My Mom" on YouTube

"To My Mom" is a song by Georgian child singer Andria Putkaradze. It was written by Giorgi Kukhianidze and Maka Davitaia, and was released on 22 October 2024 through Giga Studio Production. The song represented Georgia in the Junior Eurovision Song Contest 2024, where it won the contest with 239 points, becoming the first victory for the country since "Mzeo" by Mariam Mamadashvili in 2016.

== Background and composition ==
"To My Mom" was written by Giorgi Kukhianidze and Maka Davitaia.

== Music video ==
An accompanying music video for the song was released on 13 October 2024. The Georgian Public Broadcaster (GPB) was responsible for the filming, with Putkaradze's outfit created by Iza Nadareishvili.

== Junior Eurovision Song Contest ==
=== Ranina, songwriting process ===
GPB used Ranina (Georgian: რანინა), a children's talent show, to select the Georgian representative for the Junior Eurovision Song Contest 2024. The broadcaster opened applications for the competition on 28 November 2023 and held castings in December to select the contestants. The final list of the participants featuring Putkaradze was revealed on 25 February 2024. At the end of the competition on 26 May 2024, the singer was declared the winner. On 9 October 2024, it was revealed that the song that Putkaradze would perform at the Junior Eurovision Song Contest is called "To My Mom".

=== At Junior Eurovision ===
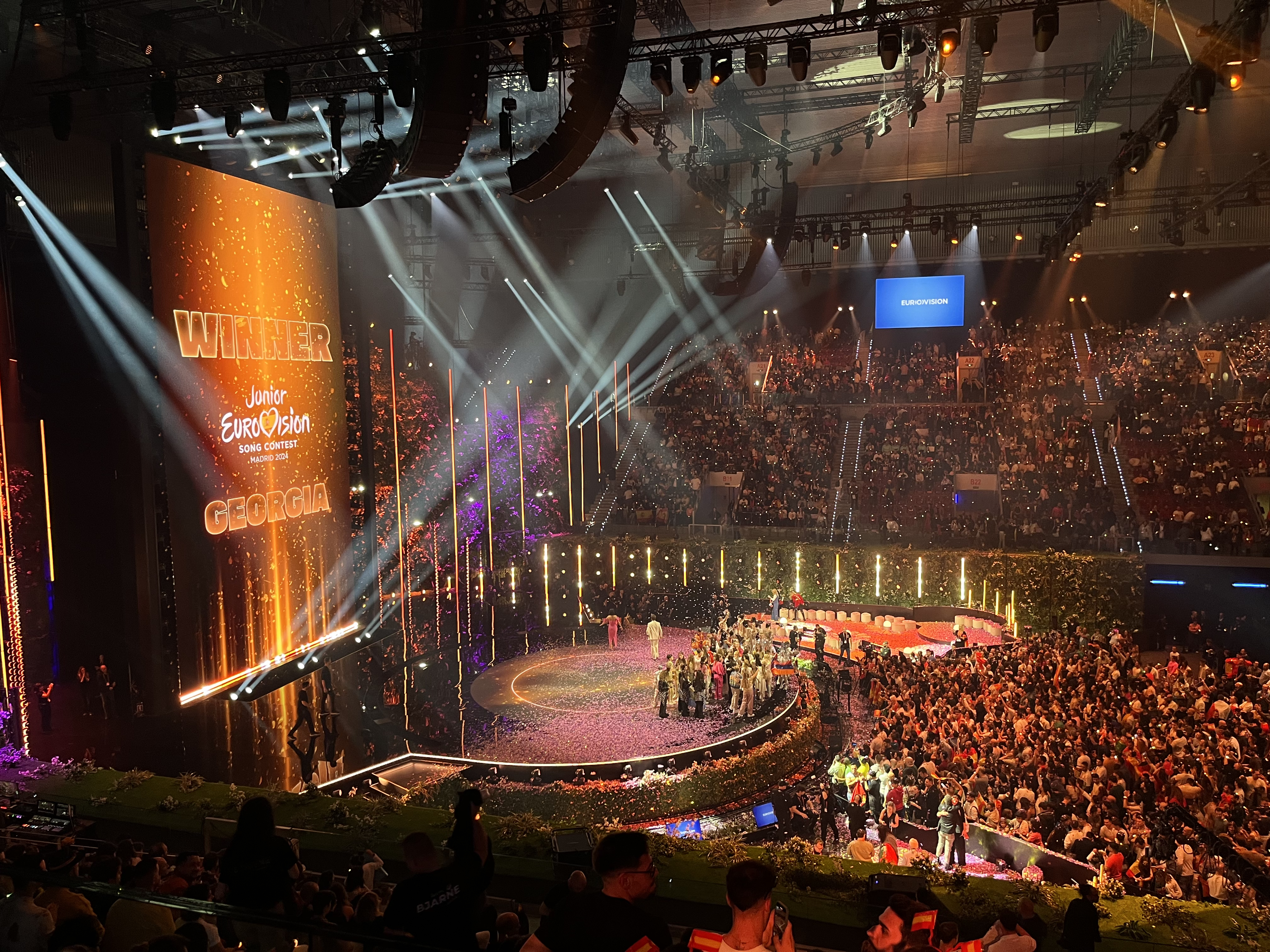
Participants on stage immediately after Putkaradze's win at the Junior Eurovision Song Contest 2024.

The Junior Eurovision Song Contest 2024 took place at Caja Mágica in Madrid, Spain, on 16 November 2024. Georgia was drawn to perform 9th, following Dominik Arim from Poland and preceding Chloe DelaRosa from Spain.

Putkaradze's performance at Junior Eurovision featured two screens, a table, and chairs. The singer was joined by dancer Gabriel Machabeli, who was dressed in a patched blazer and white shirt. One of the screens showed pictures of a mother and child, shifting clouds, windmills, and windows.

At the end of the show, Georgia won the competition with a total of 239 points. Putkaradze has become the fourth Georgian entrant to win the Junior Eurovision Song Contest.

== Release history ==
Release history and formats for "To My Mom"
Country	Date	Format(s)	Label	Ref.
Various	22 October 2024	Digital download; streaming	GIGASTUDIOPRODUCTION	
Various	1 November 2024	Digital download; streaming	Universal Music Denmark	
