= Estonia in the Junior Eurovision Song Contest 2024 =

- Junior Eurovision Song Contest 2024
- Participating broadcaster: Eesti Rahvusringhääling (ERR)
- Country: Estonia
- Selection process: Artist: Tähtede lava 2024; Song: Internal selection
- Selection date: Artist: 5 May 2024; Song: 4 October 2024

Competing entry
- Song: "Tänavad"
- Artist: Annabelle
- Songwriters: Sven Lõhmus

Placement
- Final result: 14th, 55 points

Participation chronology

Estonia was represented at the Junior Eurovision Song Contest 2024 with the song "Tänavad", written by Sven Lõhmus, and performed by Annabelle. The Estonian participating broadcaster, Eesti Rahvusringhääling (ERR), organised the national final Tähtede lava in order to select its artist for the contest, after which it internally selected the song.

== Background ==
Estonia debuted in the Junior Eurovision Song Contest in 2023. ERR had previously broadcast the contest in 2003 and 2004, however cited financial reasons for Estonia's absence from participation in the junior contest in the years running up to their debut appearance. Broadcasters from the Baltic countries, including Estonia, expressed interest in taking part in the 2016 contest, which never materialised. ERR internally selected Arhanna to represent the country in 2023, with her song "Hoiame kokku" also being internally selected and released at a later date. At the contest Arhanna finished 15th with 49 points.

ERR's head of entertainment Karmel Killandi, while interviewing Arhanna, said that she "opened the door" for artists to "perform in front of this huge audience" in future years, suggesting that Estonia could take part in 2024. On 24 November 2023, ahead of the country's debut in the contest, Estonian broadcaster ERR said that it would be looking into the possibilities of making the singing competition Tähtede lava its national final for Junior Eurovision. This was confirmed the following 4 May, ahead of the final of Tähtede lava.

== Before Junior Eurovision ==
=== Tähtede lava 2024 ===
ERR selected the Estonian representative with the biennial television program Tähtede lava (transl. Star Stage); the 2022 series of the show was won by Arhanna, who also won in her younger category in 2019, which motivated her selection to represent the country on its debut appearance in 2023. The competition consisted of five shows and concluded with a winning artist on 5 May 2024. All shows were hosted by Jaagup Tuisk and Aaron Thor Härm, and directed by Kristo Veinberg.

==== Contest overview ====
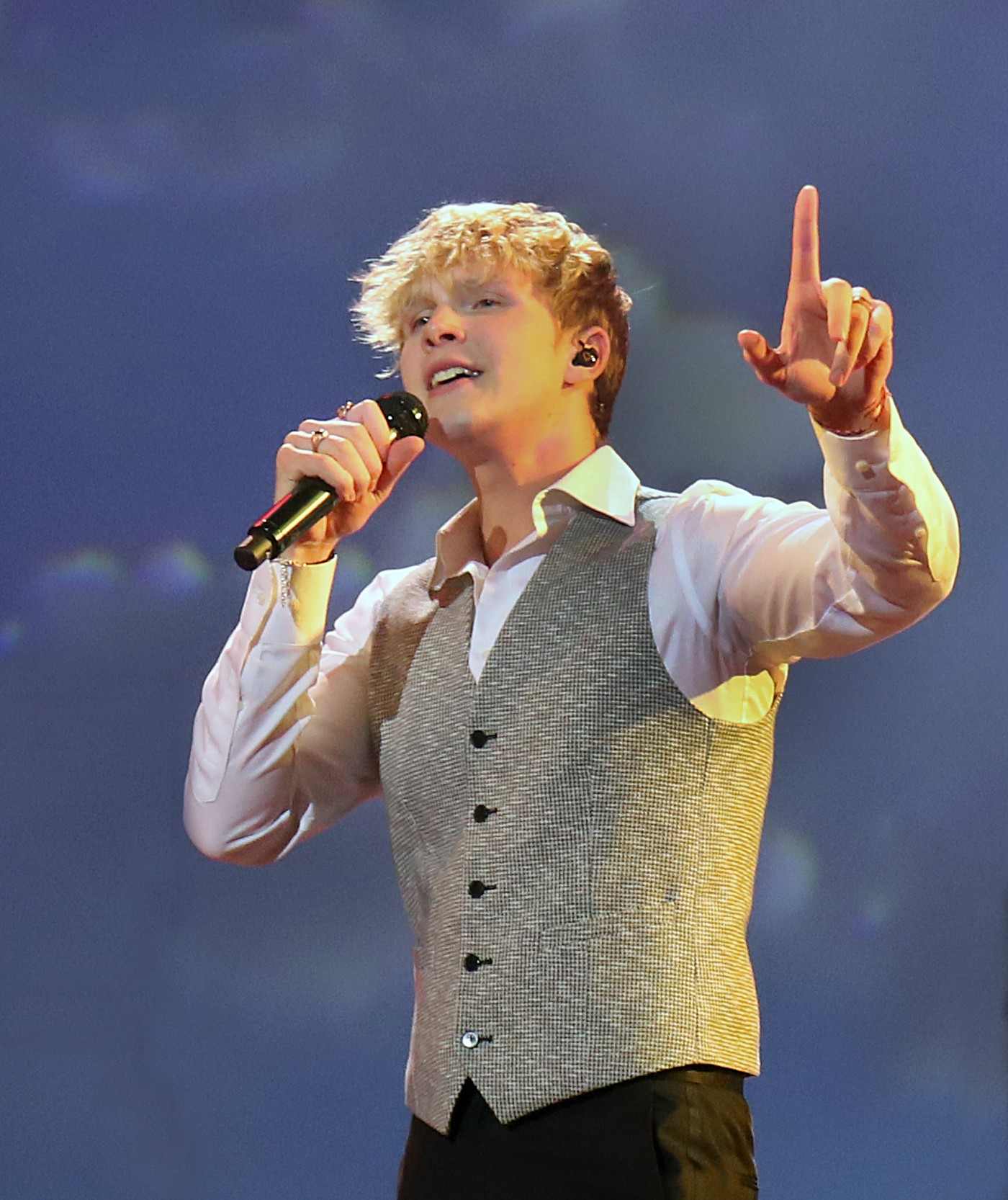
Jaagup Tuisk, co-host of Tähtede lava 2024

The 2024 series of the competition commenced on 7 April, together with the selection show of the youngest age category, which consisted of singers aged between 3 and 7 years old, and continued the following week with the selection show of the middle age category of 8 to 10 year olds, being held on 14 April; the eldest age category for singers aged between 11 and 13 years old had a selection show held on 21 April, where the three artists with the most points from the jury qualified to the final directly and an additional wildcard finalist was chosen according to the public votes. The winners of the two younger age categories were revealed during a live show called the first final, held on 28 April, while the winner of the eldest category, as well as the Estonian representative in the Junior Eurovision Song Contest, was selected on 5 May during the so-called second final.

Following a total of eight performances (two per each finalist: one solo performance and one featuring a well-known Estonian performer), the winner of the second final was determined by a combination of votes from the public and a six-member jury panel composed of Sirje Medell (singing and music teacher), Kadri Hunt (conductor, singing teacher), Robert Linna (musician), Ewert Sundja (musician, songwriter), Alice Aleksandridi (choreographer) and Maris Aljaste (organiser of Tallinna laste jazzifestival Kräsh). At the end of the show, 13 year-old Annabelle Ats was announced as the winner of Tähtede lava's eldest age category.

Key: Winner

Second final of Tähtede lava – 5 May 2024
Artist	Draw	Solo song	Draw	Duet artist	Duet song
Tristan Erik Teniste	1	"Imede öö"	5	Maarja-Liis Ilus	"Tulilinnud"
Milana Fayzullova	2	"Sügistuuled"	6	Karmen Rõivassepp	"Moanin' "
Karl-Markkus Rebane	3	"Vana lokomotiiv"	7	Silver Laas	"Trummitüdruk"
Annabelle Ats	4	"The House of the Rising Sun"	8	Kärt Sepp	"Üle vee"

== At Junior Eurovision ==
The Junior Eurovision Song Contest 2024 took place at the Caja Mágica in Madrid, Spain on 16 November 2024. Estonia will perform 2nd, following Italy and preceding Albania.

=== Voting ===
The same voting system that was introduced in the 2017 edition was used, where the results were determined by 50% online voting and 50% jury voting. Every participating broadcaster assembled a national jury that consisted of three music industry professionals and two children aged between 10 and 15 who were citizens of the country they represented. The rankings of those jurors were combined to make an overall top ten.

The online voting consisted of two phases. The first phase of the online voting began on 15 November 2024 when a recap of all the rehearsal performances was shown on the contest's website Junioreurovision.tv before the viewers could vote. After this, voters also had the option to watch longer one-minute clips from each participant's rehearsal. This first round of voting ended on 16 November at 17:59 CET. The second phase of the online voting took place during the live show and began right after the last performance and was open for 15 minutes. International viewers were able to vote for three songs. They were also able to vote for their own country's song. These votes were then turned into points which were determined by the percentage of votes received. For example, if a song received 10% of the votes, it received 10% of the available points.

At the end of the show, Estonia received 14 points from juries and 41 points from online voting, placing 14th.

Points awarded to Estonia
Score	Country
12 points	
10 points	
8 points	
7 points	
6 points	France
5 points	
4 points	Germany
3 points	
2 points	Italy
1 point	Georgia; Spain
Estonia received 41 points from the online vote

Points awarded by Estonia
Score	Country
12 points	Georgia
10 points	Armenia
8 points	Albania
7 points	Ukraine
6 points	Portugal
5 points	Spain
4 points	France
3 points	Italy
2 points	Malta
1 point	Germany

==== Detailed voting results ====
The following members comprised the Estonian jury:

- Henri Põder
- Priit Pajusaar
- Edith Oberle
- Merilin Mälk
- Tuuli Rand

Detailed voting results from Estonia
Draw	Country	Juror A	Juror B	Juror C	Juror D	Juror E	Rank	Points
01	Italy	7	2	7	11	11	8	3
02	Estonia							
03	Albania	4	14	3	3	4	3	8
04	Armenia	6	3	2	14	3	2	10
05	Cyprus	15	15	11	2	8	11	
06	France	3	4	10	6	10	7	4
07	North Macedonia	14	8	15	13	13	15	
08	Poland	10	13	8	10	15	13	
09	Georgia	1	1	1	9	2	1	12
10	Spain	2	6	14	7	6	6	5
11	Germany	8	12	9	4	9	10	1
12	Netherlands	12	9	13	5	14	12	
13	San Marino	16	16	12	16	16	16	
14	Ukraine	5	5	5	12	1	4	7
15	Portugal	11	7	6	1	7	5	6
16	Ireland	13	11	16	8	12	14	
17	Malta	9	10	4	15	5	9	2
