= Ireland in the Junior Eurovision Song Contest 2024 =

- Junior Eurovision Song Contest 2024
- Participating broadcaster: TG4
- Country: Ireland
- Selection process: Artist: Junior Eurovision Éire 2024; Song: Internal selection
- Selection date: 13 October 2024

Competing entry
- Song: "Le chéile"
- Artist: Enya Cox Dempsey
- Songwriters: Laoise Ní Nualláin; Ian James White; Nicky Brennan

Placement
- Final result: 15th, 55 points

Participation chronology

Ireland was represented at the Junior Eurovision Song Contest 2024 with the song "Le chéile", composed by Ian James White and Nicky Brennan, with lyrics by Laoise Ní Nualláin, and performed by Enya Cox Dempsey. The Irish participating broadcaster, TG4, organised the national final Junior Eurovision Éire 2024 to select its entrant for the contest, while the song was internally selected.

== Background ==
Prior to the 2024 contest, Ireland had participated in the Junior Eurovision Song Contest eight times since its debut in 2015; TG4 originally intended to make their debut a year earlier, but required funding from the Broadcasting Authority of Ireland (BAI), which was rejected. Ireland first entered the top ten in 2016, when Zena Donnelly represented the country with "Bríce ar bhríce" and ended up in 10th place out of 17 entries with 122 points; this would remain as Ireland's only top ten entry and its best result until 2022, when Sophie Lennon represented it with the song "Solas" and finished 4th with 150 points. In 2023, Jessica McKean competed for Ireland with the song "Aisling", which contained uncredited live vocals from the aforementioned Lennon and ended up in 16th (last) place with 42 points; this marked the first last place result for Ireland.

Unlike the Irish participation in the adult contest, which is managed by the Irish national broadcaster, Raidió Teilifís Éireann (RTÉ), the responsibility of broadcasting the Junior Eurovision Song Contest within Ireland and organising the selection of the nation's entry falls on TG4, which broadcasts exclusively in the Irish language.

== Before Junior Eurovision ==
=== Junior Eurovision Éire 2024 ===
TG4 confirmed its intention to participate in the 2024 contest on 5 March 2024, also revealing that it would once again use the national selection format Junior Eurovision Éire 2024, co-produced with Adare Productions, to select its artist, and opened the submission process for interested artists aged between nine and fourteen. Changes to the format of Junior Eurovision Éire 2024 were also announced, such as lowering the number of competitors to ten. Filming for the selection commenced in Dublin in early June 2024.

Further details of the competition were announced during the show's first episode on 15 September 2024. Louise Cantillon returned to host the show for the fourth time in a row. Niamh Ní Chróinín also returned as one of the two permanent judges.

==== Participants ====
The ten participants competing in the 2024 edition were revealed at the end of the first show:

- Kiefer Byrne
- Enya Cox Dempsey
- Safiya Devlin
- Robin Doyle
- Harry Greaney
- Katelyn Harrington
- Charlotte Mackey
- Isla McManus
- Abiha Mansoor
- Lottie O'Driscoll Murray

==== Jury members ====
As in previous editions, the results of the live shows were decided by an in-studio jury of two permanent members and revolving guest judges. The two permanent judges are:

- Niamh Ní Chróinín – Radio presenter, manager of Irish-language youth radio station Raidió Rí-Rá
- Tadhg Ó Gríofa – Irish singer

Guest judges
Artist	ESC Year(s)	Song(s)	Place (SF)	Points (SF)	Place (Final)	Points (Final)
Linda Martin	1984	"Terminal 3"	No semi-finals		2	137
Linda Martin	1992	"Why Me?"	No semi-finals		1	155
Niamh Kavanagh	1993	"In Your Eyes"	No semi-finals		1	187
Niamh Kavanagh	2010	"It's for You"	9	67	23	25
Brooke Scullion	2022	"That's Rich"	15	47	Failed to qualify	
Sophie Lennon	2022 (Note: Competed in the junior contest.)	"Solas"	No semi-finals		4	150
Sophie Lennon	2023 (Note: Competed in the junior contest.)	"Aisling" (as a featuring artist with Jessica McKean)	No semi-finals		16 ◁	42

==== First round ====
The second show was broadcast on 22 September 2024, with Brooke Scullion as the guest judge. Unlike in previous years, rather than contestants compete in heats for a ticket to the semi-final, all ten finalists performed in the first show with two being eliminated from the competition. The show consisted of all ten artists performing Irish-language covers of popular songs. Safiya Devlin and Harry Greaney did not advance, while the remaining eight contestants progressed to the next round.

Show 2 – 22 September 2024
Draw	Artist	Song (Original artists)	Result
1	Enya Cox Dempsey	"Driver's Licence" (Olivia Rodrigo)	Advanced
2	Isla McManus	"Perfect" (Ed Sheeran)	Advanced
3	Kiefer Byrne	"Valerie" (Amy Winehouse & Mark Ronson)	Advanced
4	Abiha Mansoor	"Only Love Can Hurt Like This" (Paloma Faith)	Advanced
5	Robin Doyle	"New York" (Paloma Faith)	Advanced
6	Lottie O'Driscoll Murray	"And I Am Telling You I'm Not Going" (Jennifer Holliday)	Advanced
7	Charlotte Mackay	"I Will Always Love You" (Whitney Houston)	Advanced
8	Katelyn Harrington	"Spotlight" (Jennifer Hudson)	Advanced
9	Safiya Devlin	"If I Could Turn Back Time" (Cher)	Eliminated
10	Harry Greaney	"Eyes Closed" (Ed Sheeran)	Eliminated

==== Second round ====
The third show was broadcast on 29 September 2024, with Niamh Kavanagh as the guest judge. The remaining eight artists performed with another two being eliminated from the competition. The show consisted of all eight artists performing Irish-language covers of popular songs. Kiefer Byrne and Robyn Doyle did not advance to the next round, while the remaining six contestants progressed to the semi-final.

Show 3 – 29 September 2024
Draw	Artist	Song (Original artists)	Result
1	Lottie O'Driscoll Murray	"Take Me to Church" (Hozier)	Advanced
2	Enya Cox Dempsey	"Someone You Loved" (Lewis Capaldi)	Advanced
3	Katelyn Harrington	"Stay With Me" (Sam Smith)	Advanced
4	Abiha Mansoor	"Always" (Gavin James)	Advanced
5	Isla McManus	"Skinny Love" (Birdy)	Advanced
6	Charlotte Mackey	"Can't Help Falling in Love" (Elvis Presley)	Advanced
7	Robyn Doyle	"Brave" (Ella Henderson)	Eliminated
8	Kiefer Byrne	"Halo" (Beyoncé)	Eliminated

==== Semi-final ====
The fourth show was broadcast on 6 October 2024, with Sophie Lennon as the guest judge. The remaining six artists performed with three contestants being eliminated from the competition. The show consisted of all six artists performing Irish-language covers of popular songs. Katelyn Harrington, Charlotte Mackay and Abiha Mansoor did not advance, while the final three contestants qualified for the final.

Show 4 – 6 October 2024
Draw	Artist	Song (Original artists)	Result
1	Lottie O'Driscoll Murray	"Castles" (Freya Ridings)	Advanced
2	Enya Cox Dempsey	"Back to Black" (Amy Winehouse)	Advanced
3	Charlotte Mackay	"Hold Me While You Wait" (Lewis Capaldi)	Eliminated
4	Isla McManus	"Nervous" (Gavin James)	Advanced
5	Abiha Mansoor	"Pompeii" (Bastille)	Eliminated
6	Katelyn Harrington	"Brave" (Ella Henderson)	Eliminated

==== Final ====
The fifth and final show took place on 13 October 2024, with Linda Martin as the guest judge. First, the remaining three finalists performed an Irish-language cover of a popular song from the previous weeks, and then performed a cover of a famous Eurovision song. After revealing Enya Cox Dempsey and Lottie O’Driscoll Murray as the top 2, they performed their rendition of the 2024 Irish entry "Le chéile". Enya Cox Dempsey was later revealed as the winner chosen by the jury, earning the right to represent Ireland at the Junior Eurovision Song Contest 2024 in Madrid.

Show 5 – 13 October 2024
Artist	Draw	Song (Song from the series)	Draw	Song (Eurovision cover)	Result
Lottie O'Driscoll Murray	1	"And I Am Telling You I'm Not Going" (Jennifer Holliday)	4	"Euphoria" (Loreen) - Won for Sweden in 2012	Advanced
Isla McManus	2	"Perfect" (Ed Sheeran)	5	"Rock 'n' Roll Kids" (Paul Harrington and Charlie McGettigan) - Won for Ireland in 1994	Eliminated
Enya Cox Dempsey	3	"Driver's Licence" (Olivia Rodrigo)	6	"Arcade" (Duncan Laurence) - Won for the Netherlands in 2019	Advanced

Artist	Draw	Song (JESC entry)	Juror 1	Juror 2	Juror 3	Result
Lottie O'Driscoll Murray	7	"Le chéile"	-	X	-	2
Enya Cox Dempsey	8	"Le chéile"	X	-	X	1

== At Junior Eurovision ==
The Junior Eurovision Song Contest 2024 is set to take place at Caja Mágica in Madrid, Spain on 16 November 2024. Ireland will perform 16th of 17 participating countries, following Portugal and preceding Malta.

=== Voting ===
The same voting system that was introduced in the 2017 edition was used, where the results were determined by 50% online voting and 50% jury voting. Every participating broadcaster assembled a national jury that consisted of three music industry professionals and two children aged between 10 and 15 who were citizens of the country they represented. The rankings of those jurors were combined to make an overall top ten.

The online voting consisted of two phases. The first phase of the online voting began on 15 November 2024 when a recap of all the rehearsal performances was shown on the contest's website Junioreurovision.tv before the viewers could vote. After this, voters also had the option to watch longer one-minute clips from each participant's rehearsal. This first round of voting ended on 16 November at 17:59 CET. The second phase of the online voting took place during the live show and began right after the last performance and was open for 15 minutes. International viewers were able to vote for three songs. They were also able to vote for their own country's song. These votes were then turned into points which were determined by the percentage of votes received. For example, if a song received 10% of the votes, it received 10% of the available points.

At the end of the show, Ireland received 15 points from juries and 40 points from online voting, placing 15th.

Points awarded to Ireland
Score	Country
12 points	
10 points	
8 points	
7 points	
6 points	
5 points	Germany
4 points	Georgia
3 points	Spain
2 points	France
1 point	Portugal
Ireland received 40 points from the online vote

Points awarded by Ireland
Score	Country
12 points	Georgia
10 points	France
8 points	Albania
7 points	Ukraine
6 points	Portugal
5 points	Spain
4 points	Netherlands
3 points	Poland
2 points	Cyprus
1 point	Germany

==== Detailed voting results ====
The following members comprised the Irish jury:

- Mark Kelly
- Stephen Rosney
- Corissa Mulvany
- Norita Ní Chartúir
- Paula Healy

Detailed voting results from Ireland
Draw	Country	Juror A	Juror B	Juror C	Juror D	Juror E	Rank	Points
01	Italy	14	6	8	8	16	12	
02	Estonia	5	7	13	13	12	11	
03	Albania	2	5	1	11	13	3	8
04	Armenia	12	8	12	12	7	14	
05	Cyprus	6	9	3	15	14	9	2
06	France	3	4	2	4	3	2	10
07	North Macedonia	15	11	11	14	8	15	
08	Poland	16	10	9	3	6	8	3
09	Georgia	1	1	10	6	1	1	12
10	Spain	7	12	14	2	4	6	5
11	Germany	13	13	15	1	11	10	1
12	Netherlands	9	14	4	5	5	7	4
13	San Marino	11	16	16	16	15	16	
14	Ukraine	10	2	6	7	2	4	7
15	Portugal	4	3	5	9	9	5	6
16	Ireland							
17	Malta	8	15	7	10	10	13	
