= Albania in the Junior Eurovision Song Contest 2024 =

- Junior Eurovision Song Contest 2024
- Participating broadcaster: Radio Televizioni Shqiptar (RTSH)
- Country: Albania
- Selection process: Junior Fest Albania 2024
- Selection date: 27 September 2024

Competing entry
- Song: "Vallëzoj"
- Artist: Nikol Çabeli

Placement
- Final result: 7th, 126 points

Participation chronology

Albania was represented at the Junior Eurovision Song Contest 2024 with the song "Vallëzoj", produced by Enis Mullaj, composed by Endri Muçaj, with lyrics by Eriona Rushiti, and performed by Nikol Çabeli. The Albanian participating broadcaster, Radio Televizioni Shqiptar (RTSH), organised the national final Junior Fest Albania 2024 in order to select it entry for the contest.

== Background ==
Prior to the 2024 contest, Albania had participated in the contest nine times since its first entry in the 2012 contest. Albania has never won the contest, with their best result being in 2015, when Mishela Rapo represented the country with "Dambaje", placing 5th. The nation opted not to take part in the contest in 2013 and 2014, and in 2020 (due to the COVID-19 pandemic). In 2023, Viola Gjyzeli competed for Albania with the song "Bota ime", which ended up in 8th place with 115 points; this marked the first top ten entry for Albania since 2015.

== Before Junior Eurovision ==
=== Junior Fest Albania 2024 ===
Junior Fest Albania 2024 was the seventh edition of Junior Fest Albania, the national final format developed by RTSH to select Albanian entries for the Junior Eurovision Song Contest. The submission process for interested artists aged between nine and fourteen and composers to submit their entries for the competition was open between 29 July 2024 and 31 August 2024. Eighteen finalists were selected by a jury panel composed of music industry professionals and announced on 3 September 2024, with one-minute snippets of the songs published on the following 12 September.

RTSH had announced their intention to apply changes to the format of the competition – which took place on 27 September 2024 at the RTSH Symphony Orchestra Hall in Tirana, hosted by Angelo Shkreli and Julian Hurdha, and broadcast on RTSH 1, RTSH Muzikë and Radio Tirana 1 – stating it would take place under a "brand new formula, in the form of a spectacle". Migena Kraja and Klodian Qafoku were appointed the artistic and musical director of the event, respectively. The slogan for the competition was "Ti lulëzo" ("You bloom"), inspired by the theme art and slogan of the 2024 contest.

The winner of the competition was determined by the combination of the votes by a five-member jury panel, with the final also seeing several acts receive special awards for their participation; these included the prize for best vocals to Eden Dani, the prize for best lyrics to Ami Kokurti and the Robert Radoja encouragement prize to Ema Deda. Nikol Çabeli, born in Ioannina, Greece and residing in Gjirokastër, Albania, was declared the winner with the song "Vallëzoj". In addition to the competing entries, the guest performers included Mal Retkoceri (winner of Festivali i Këngës 62) with "Çmendur", Eranda Libohova with "Marinela" and Viola Gjyzeli with "Bota ime", after which a children's choir also performed "Footloose" and the finalists performed a common song; Retkoceri was also one of the members of the jury panel.

Key: Winner Second place Third place

Final – 27 September 2024
R/O	Artist	Song	Songwriter(s)	Place
1	Kejt Hitaj	"Ëndërrojnë"	Adrian Hila	—N/a
2	Elora Tahitri	"Me lajka"	Enis Mullaj	—N/a
3	Gjon Gjipali	"S'ka problem"	Renis Gjoka	2
4	Arbëri Dajko	"Ëndrra në detin blu"	Fabian Basha	—N/a
5	Doris Canaj	"Jemi njësoj"	Melodajn Mancaku	—N/a
6	Armina Kajnozi	"Mama"	Adrian Hila; Egzona Ademi	—N/a
7	Boris Metaj	"Se jemi ne"	Edmond Zhulali; Remo Torra	3
8	Nikol Çabeli	"Vallëzoj"	Endri Muçaj; Eriona Rushiti	1
9	Hana Lamaj	"Medaljon"	Arbër Koçllari	—N/a
10	David Kerri	"Thirrja e tokës"	Florian Zyka; Kevin Zotrija	—N/a
11	Ema Deda	"Hapat"	Mario Deda	—N/a
12	Eden Dani	"Ti më sjell fat"	Alban Kondi	—N/a
13	Gedis Germani	"Flutura prej letre"	Artur Dhamo; Florian Zyka	—N/a
14	Ami Kokurti	"Reale"	Enis Mullaj; Eriona Rushiti	—N/a
15	Kejsi Xheladini	"Dua të këndoj"	Reinald Foçi	—N/a
16	Klejda Bashota	"Një këngë për ty"	Florent Boshnjaku	—N/a
17	Marina Daka	"Nuk do ndalem"	Eriona Rushiti; Irma Libohova	—N/a
18	Kristel Xhafka	"Party"	Metila Dervishi	—N/a

=== Preparation ===
In early October 2024, the producers behind "Vallëzoj" confirmed that it would undergo a revamp ahead of the contest; it was released on 8 October alongside an accompanying music video.

== At Junior Eurovision ==
The Junior Eurovision Song Contest 2024 took place at Caja Mágica in Madrid, Spain on 16 November 2024. Albania performed 3rd, following Estonia and preceding Armenia.

=== Voting ===
The same voting system that was introduced in the 2017 edition was used, where the results were determined by 50% online voting and 50% jury voting. Every participating broadcaster assembled a national jury that consisted of three music industry professionals and two children aged between 10 and 15 who were citizens of the country they represented. The rankings of those jurors were combined to make an overall top ten.

The online voting consisted of two phases. The first phase of the online voting began on 15 November 2024 when a recap of all the rehearsal performances was shown on the contest's website Junioreurovision.tv before the viewers could vote. After this, voters also had the option to watch longer one-minute clips from each participant's rehearsal. This first round of voting ended on 16 November at 17:59 CET. The second phase of the online voting took place during the live show and began right after the last performance and was open for 15 minutes. International viewers were able to vote for three songs. They were also able to vote for their own country's song. These votes were then turned into points which were determined by the percentage of votes received. For example, if a song received 10% of the votes, it received 10% of the available points.

At the end of the show, Albania received 82 points from juries and 44 points from online voting, placing 7th.

Points awarded to Albania
Score	Country
12 points	
10 points	Portugal
8 points	Estonia; Ireland; Ukraine
7 points	Cyprus; Germany
6 points	Italy; Malta; Spain
5 points	Armenia; Poland
4 points	
3 points	San Marino
2 points	Netherlands
1 point	North Macedonia
Albania received 44 points from the online vote

Points awarded by Albania
Score	Country
12 points	Georgia
10 points	Ukraine
8 points	Portugal
7 points	Spain
6 points	Italy
5 points	France
4 points	Malta
3 points	North Macedonia
2 points	Armenia
1 point	Netherlands

==== Detailed voting results ====
The following members comprised the Albanian jury:

- Boris Metaj
- Endri Sina
- Blerina Arbana
- Kejsi Xheladini
- Vesa Luma

Detailed voting results from Albania
Draw	Country	Juror A	Juror B	Juror C	Juror D	Juror E	Rank	Points
01	Italy	3	13	6	4	4	5	6
02	Estonia	11	15	11	10	8	12	
03	Albania							
04	Armenia	9	9	9	9	10	9	2
05	Cyprus	12	7	15	14	14	13	
06	France	5	10	3	5	7	6	5
07	North Macedonia	7	12	5	7	6	8	3
08	Poland	13	14	13	11	15	15	
09	Georgia	1	2	2	1	1	1	12
10	Spain	6	3	1	6	9	4	7
11	Germany	15	5	14	15	12	11	
12	Netherlands	10	6	10	12	11	10	1
13	San Marino	16	16	16	16	16	16	
14	Ukraine	4	1	4	3	2	2	10
15	Portugal	2	4	7	2	5	3	8
16	Ireland	14	11	12	13	13	14	
17	Malta	8	8	8	8	3	7	4
