= Malta in the Junior Eurovision Song Contest 2024 =

- Junior Eurovision Song Contest 2024
- Participating broadcaster: Public Broadcasting Services (PBS)
- Country: Malta
- Selection process: Malta Junior Eurovision Song Contest 2024
- Selection date: 21 September 2024

Competing entry
- Song: "Stilla ċkejkna"
- Artist: Ramires Sciberras
- Songwriters: Aleandro Spiteri Monseigneur; Marlon Chircop; Peter Borg

Placement
- Final result: 5th, 153 points

Participation chronology

Malta was represented at the Junior Eurovision Song Contest 2024 with the song "Stilla ċkejkna", composed by Aleandro Spiteri Monseigneur and Peter Borg, with lyrics by Marlon Chircop, and performed by Ramires Sciberras. The Maltese participating broadcaster, Public Broadcasting Services (PBS), organised the national final Malta Junior Eurovision Song Contest 2024 in order to select its entry for the contest.

== Background ==
Prior to the 2024 contest, Malta had participated in the contest nineteen times since its first entry in the inaugural 2003 contest. Since then, Malta has won the contest on two occasions: in 2013 with "The Start" performed by Gaia Cauchi, and in 2015 with "Not My Soul" performed by Destiny Chukunyere. The nation opted not to take part in the contest in 2011 and 2012. In 2023, Yulan competed for Malta with the song "Stronger", which ended up in 10th place out of 16 entries with 94 points.

== Before Junior Eurovision ==
=== Malta Junior Eurovision Song Contest 2024 ===
Malta Junior Eurovision Song Contest 2024 was the national final format developed by PBS to select the Maltese entry for the Junior Eurovision Song Contest 2024. The competition consisted of a final on 21 September 2024, coinciding with Malta's Independence Day, held at the TVM Studios in Pietà, and hosted by Melanie Kelly, and broadcast on Television Malta (TVM) as well as on the broadcaster's streaming platform tvmi.mt.

==== Competing entries ====
On 6 May 2024, PBS announced the MESC and MJESC Music Exchange Camp would be held between 17 and 23 June, dedicated to the creation of a total of 60 competing songs for the following two national selections. The camp dedicated to the creation of entries for the Malta Junior Eurovision Song Contest 2024 featured ten artists aged between nine and fourteen.

On 12 July 2024, PBS published the rules of the competition, opening a window for interested artists aged between nine and fourteen and composers to submit their entries until 19 August 2024. Songwriters from any nationality were able to submit songs as long as the artist was Maltese or possessed Maltese citizenship. Artists were able to submit as many songs as they wish, however, they could only compete with one in the final. Yulan, who represented Malta in the 2023 contest, was ineligible to compete due to a rule that prevents the previous winner from entering the following year. A dedicated panel selected the finalist entries, which were announced on 26 August 2024, with one-minute snippets of the songs published on 5 September.

==== Final ====
The final took place on 21 September 2024. The winner was determined by a weighed combination of votes from a jury panel (80%) and a public televote (20%), with the former taking precedence in the event of a tie. In addition to the competing entries, Chanel Monseigneur, who represented Malta in the 2020 contest, Gaia Gambuzza, who represented Malta in the 2022 contest, and Yulan performed as the interval acts. Ramires Sciberras – a twelve-year-old singer of Cambodian descent, adopted by Maltese parents at a young age – was declared the winner with the song "Stilla ċkejkna", which became the first Maltese entry to be performed entirely in the Maltese language.

Key: Winner Second place Third place

Final – 21 September 2024
Draw	Artist	Song	Songwriter(s)
1	Shaz	"Above It All"	Alexandra Rotan; Audun Agnar Gulbrandsen; Henrik Tala; Sara Biglert
2	Andrea	"Gold"	Andrea Camilleri; Andreas Lindbergh; Maria Cachia Abdilla; Remy Borsboom
3	Eleny	"Guiding Light"	Joe Julian Farrugia; Philip Vella
4	Emma Farrugia	"Summertime"	Emil Calleja Bayliss; John Emil Johansson; Soren Emil Lunoe Schiodt
5	Grrlz	"Grrlz"	Henrik Tala; Leila Borg; Remy Borsboom; Matthew Mercieca
6	Ilona	"Zip It Up"	Emil Calleja Bayliss; Philip Vella
7	Anneka Xerri	"Trying to Be Me (Ħeqq le)"	Anneka Xerri; David Meliak; Jean Paul Borg; Michael Joe Cini
8	Kayleen	"Lalala"	Matthew Borg Brincau
9	Ramires Sciberras	"Stilla ċkejkna"	Aleandro Spiteri Monseigneur; Marlon Chircop; Peter Borg
10	Maria Curmi	"Għawdex"	Emil Calleja Bayliss; Philip Vella
11	Keira	"Kif jien"	Aldo Spiteri; Bradley Spiteri; Liam Spiteri; Rita Pace
12	Chanel	"I'll Be Alright"	Christina Karei Magrin; Sebastian Pritchard-James
13	Thomas Casha	"A Little Bit Longer"	Matthew Caruana; Matteo Depares
14	Daylin Cassar Randich	"Bonafide"	Anderz Wrethov; Andreas Stone Johansson; Mohombi Nzasi Moupondo

=== Preparation ===
In late September 2024, Sciberras revealed that his entry "Stilla ċkejkna" would undergo a revamp ahead of the contest.

== At Junior Eurovision ==
The Junior Eurovision Song Contest 2024 will take place at the Caja Mágica in Madrid, Spain on 16 November 2024. On 1 October 2024, during the Heads of Delegation meeting, Malta was drawn to close the event in position 17.

=== Voting ===
The same voting system that was introduced in the 2017 edition was used, where the results were determined by 50% online voting and 50% jury voting. Every participating broadcaster assembled a national jury that consisted of three music industry professionals and two children aged between 10 and 15 who were citizens of the country they represented. The rankings of those jurors were combined to make an overall top ten.

The online voting consisted of two phases. The first phase of the online voting began on 15 November 2024 when a recap of all the rehearsal performances was shown on the contest's website Junioreurovision.tv before the viewers could vote. After this, voters also had the option to watch longer one-minute clips from each participant's rehearsal. This first round of voting ended on 16 November at 17:59 CET. The second phase of the online voting took place during the live show and began right after the last performance and was open for 15 minutes. International viewers were able to vote for three songs. They were also able to vote for their own country's song. These votes were then turned into points which were determined by the percentage of votes received. For example, if a song received 10% of the votes, it received 10% of the available points.

At the end of the show, Malta received 74 points from juries and 79 points from online voting, placing 5th.

Points awarded to Malta
Score	Country
12 points	
10 points	San Marino
8 points	North Macedonia
7 points	Spain; Ukraine
6 points	Armenia; Cyprus; Georgia; Germany
5 points	Portugal
4 points	Albania; France
3 points	Netherlands
2 points	Estonia
1 point	
Malta received 79 points from the online vote

Points awarded by Malta
Score	Country
12 points	Georgia
10 points	Ukraine
8 points	Armenia
7 points	Italy
6 points	Albania
5 points	France
4 points	Portugal
3 points	North Macedonia
2 points	Spain
1 point	Netherlands

==== Detailed voting results ====
The following members comprised the Maltese jury:

- Andrea Camilleri
- Cyprian Cassar
- Etienne Micallef
- Maria Curmi
- Maxine Pace

Detailed voting results from Malta
Draw	Country	Juror A	Juror B	Juror C	Juror D	Juror E	Rank	Points
01	Italy	3	3	5	3	6	4	7
02	Estonia	8	13	11	10	7	11	
03	Albania	4	2	3	8	13	5	6
04	Armenia	7	7	4	1	2	3	8
05	Cyprus	15	11	15	14	14	14	
06	France	5	5	9	4	4	6	5
07	North Macedonia	6	6	2	13	10	8	3
08	Poland	12	14	13	15	15	15	
09	Georgia	1	1	1	7	9	1	12
10	Spain	9	8	6	5	5	9	2
11	Germany	13	10	14	12	12	12	
12	Netherlands	10	9	8	9	8	10	1
13	San Marino	16	16	16	16	16	16	
14	Ukraine	2	4	7	6	1	2	10
15	Portugal	11	12	10	2	3	7	4
16	Ireland	14	15	12	11	11	13	
17	Malta							
