= Armenia in the Junior Eurovision Song Contest 2024 =

- Junior Eurovision Song Contest 2024
- Participating broadcaster: Public Television of Armenia (AMPTV)
- Country: Armenia
- Selection process: Internal selection
- Announcement date: Artist: 28 September 2024; Song: 22 October 2024

Competing entry
- Song: "Cosmic Friend"
- Artist: Leo
- Songwriters: Arpine Martoyan; Tokionine; Vahram Petrosyan

Placement
- Final result: 8th, 125 points

Participation chronology

Armenia was represented at the Junior Eurovision Song Contest 2024 with the song "Cosmic Friend", written by Arpine Martoyan, Tokionine and Vahram Petrosyan, and performed by Leo. The Armenian participating broadcaster, Public Television of Armenia (AMPTV), internally selected its entry for the contest.

== Background ==
Prior to the 2024 contest, Armenia had participated in the contest sixteen times since its first entry in the 2007 contest. Since then, it had placed inside of the top three on ten occasions – more than any other country to have ever competed – and won the contest on three occasions: in 2010 with the song "Mama" performed by Vladimir Arzumanyan, in 2021 with "Qami Qami" performed by Maléna, and in 2026 with "Boo!" performed by Naré. The nation opted not to take part in the contest in 2020 due to the martial law imposed on the country as a result of the then-ongoing Second Nagorno-Karabakh War; it was then set to be represented by Maléna. In 2023, Yan Girls competed for Armenia with the song "Do It My Way", which ended up in 3rd place out of 16 entries with 180 points.

== Before Junior Eurovision ==
Upon confirming its participation in the 2024 contest, AMPTV declared it would internally select its entrant and entry, and opened a submission process for interested artists aged between nine and fourteen, lasting until 21 July 2024; the deadline was later extended to 28 July 2024. All submissions required participants to enter covers of two songs, with the Junior Eurovision entry to be written for the selected entrant at a later date. Upon closing the submission period, over 100 applications had been submitted.

Following two rounds of auditions, an expert focus group consisting of both local and international industry professionals and appointed by AMPTV (presented in the table below) determined the eventual representative for the country. On 28 September 2024, AMPTV announced that it had internally selected ten-year-old Leo Mkrtchyan, known mononymously as Leo, as the Armenian entrant for the 2024 contest. His competing song, "Cosmic Friend", was released on 22 October 2024.

Members of the expert focus group
Member	Country	Occupation
Alexandra Redde-Amiel	France	French head of delegation, executive producer of the 2021 and 2023 contests
Aramayis Hayrapetyan	Armenia	Director, founder of Gravity Production
Carla Bugalho	Portugal	Portuguese head of delegation, executive producer of Festival da Canção
Garik Papoyan	Armenia	Actor, musician, presenter, writer and comedian, presenter of the 2022 contest
Iveta Mukuchyan	Armenia	Singer, represented Armenia in the Eurovision Song Contest 2016, presenter of the 2022 contest
Lee Smithurst	United Kingdom	British head of delegation at the Eurovision Song Contest, head of show for the Eurovision Song Contest 2023
Marta Piekarska	Poland	Polish head of delegation, executive producer of the 2020 contest

== At Junior Eurovision ==
The Junior Eurovision Song Contest 2024 is set to take place at Caja Mágica in Madrid, Spain on 16 November 2024. Armenia will perform 4th, following Albania and preceding Cyprus.

=== Voting ===
The same voting system that was introduced in the 2017 edition was used, where the results were determined by 50% online voting and 50% jury voting. Every participating broadcaster assembled a national jury that consisted of three music industry professionals and two children aged between 10 and 15 who were citizens of the country they represented. The rankings of those jurors were combined to make an overall top ten.

The online voting consisted of two phases. The first phase of the online voting began on 15 November 2024 when a recap of all the rehearsal performances was shown on the contest's website Junioreurovision.tv before the viewers could vote. After this, voters also had the option to watch longer one-minute clips from each participant's rehearsal. This first round of voting ended on 16 November at 17:59 CET. The second phase of the online voting took place during the live show and began right after the last performance and was open for 15 minutes. International viewers were able to vote for three songs. They were also able to vote for their own country's song. These votes were then turned into points which were determined by the percentage of votes received. For example, if a song received 10% of the votes, it received 10% of the available points.

At the end of the show, Armenia received 76 points from juries and 49 points from online voting, placing 8th.

Points awarded to Armenia
Score	Country
12 points	France; Georgia
10 points	Estonia
8 points	Malta
7 points	Netherlands
6 points	Portugal
5 points	North Macedonia; Ukraine
4 points	Spain
3 points	
2 points	Albania; Poland; San Marino
1 point	Cyprus
Armenia received 49 points from the online vote

Points awarded by Armenia
Score	Country
12 points	Georgia
10 points	France
8 points	Italy
7 points	Netherlands
6 points	Malta
5 points	Albania
4 points	Cyprus
3 points	North Macedonia
2 points	Germany
1 point	Spain

==== Detailed voting results ====
The following members comprised the Armenian jury:

- Arman Mitoyan
- Arsen Grigoryan
- Aida Sargsian
- Kamilla Davtyan
- Srbuhi Sargsyan

Detailed voting results from Armenia
Draw	Country	Juror A	Juror B	Juror C	Juror D	Juror E	Rank	Points
01	Italy	4	3	2	11	6	3	8
02	Estonia	14	10	11	13	13	14	
03	Albania	11	2	8	7	10	6	5
04	Armenia							
05	Cyprus	6	4	5	12	12	7	4
06	France	3	8	14	2	1	2	10
07	North Macedonia	13	5	12	5	5	8	3
08	Poland	8	15	15	15	16	15	
09	Georgia	1	1	1	1	2	1	12
10	Spain	12	12	10	8	3	10	1
11	Germany	7	7	4	16	7	9	2
12	Netherlands	2	6	3	6	8	4	7
13	San Marino	15	16	16	14	15	16	
14	Ukraine	10	14	13	9	4	12	
15	Portugal	9	11	9	10	9	13	
16	Ireland	16	9	7	4	14	11	
17	Malta	5	13	6	3	11	5	6
