= Italy in the Junior Eurovision Song Contest 2024 =

- Junior Eurovision Song Contest 2024
- Participating broadcaster: Radiotelevisione italiana (RAI)
- Country: Italy
- Selection process: Internal selection
- Announcement date: Artist: 19 September 2024; Song: 27 September 2024

Competing entry
- Song: "Pigiama party"
- Artist: Simone Grande
- Songwriters: Alex Uhlmann; Luca Mattioni; Pablo Meneguzzo

Placement
- Final result: 9th, 98 points

Participation chronology

Italy was represented at the Junior Eurovision Song Contest 2024 with the song "Pigiama party", written by Alex Uhlmann, Luca Mattioni, and Pablo Meneguzzo, and performed by Simone Grande. The Italian participating broadcaster, Radiotelevisione italiana (RAI), internally selected its entry for the contest.

== Background ==
Prior to the 2024 contest, Italy had participated in the contest nine times since its first entry in the 2014 contest, winning the contest with its debut entry "Tu primo grande amore" performed by Vincenzo Cantiello, marking its only win to this point. The nation opted not to take part in the contest in 2020 (due to the COVID-19 pandemic). In 2022, Rai Gulp – which had previously been in charge of Italy's participation in the contest – was replaced within the structures of RAI by the flagship channel Rai 1, citing a new division of schedules and a desire for such events to reach a wider audience; this led to a large increase of viewers watching the show in Italy. In 2023, Melissa and Ranya competed for Italy with the song "Un mondo giusto", which ended up in 11th place out of 16 entries with 81 points.

== Before Junior Eurovision ==
During the final of the second season of The Voice Kids in December 2023, host Antonella Clerici revealed that one of the show's twelve finalists would go on to represent Italy in the 2024 contest; this was misinterpreted by much of the local media as a confirmation of the show's winner, Simone Grande from Rozzano near Milan, being selected to represent the nation, which had not been at that point confirmed by RAI. On 10 September 2024, RAI announced that it had internally selected the Italian entrant for the contest and that they would be revealed on 19 September. Grande (who was, at the time of his selection, a twelve-year-old) was eventually announced as the entrant with the song "Pigiama party", which was written by Alex Uhlmann, Luca Mattioni and Pablo Meneguzzo and released on 27 September, alongside an accompanying music video.

== At Junior Eurovision ==
The Junior Eurovision Song Contest 2024 took place at the Caja Mágica in Madrid, Spain on 16 November 2024. On 1 October 2024, during the heads of delegation meeting, Italy was drawn to open the event in position 1.

In Italy, the event was broadcast on Rai 2 and RaiPlay, with commentary provided by Mario Acampa; Rai Kids was responsible for the television production of the Italian broadcast.

=== Performance ===
Grande's performance was staged by Claudio Santucci and choreographed by Manuela Saccardi, with the supervision of Laccio. RAI described the concept of the performance as "touching on the themes of the right to childhood, to play, to lightheartedness".

=== Voting ===
The same voting system that was introduced in the 2017 edition will be used, where the results will be determined by 50% online voting and 50% jury voting. Every participating broadcaster assembles a national jury that consists of three music industry professionals and two children aged between 10 and 15 who are citizens of the country they represent. The rankings of those jurors are combined to make an overall top ten.

The online voting consists of two phases. The first phase of the online voting will begin on 15 November 2024 when a recap of all the rehearsal performances is shown on the contest's website Junioreurovision.tv before the viewers can vote. After this, voters will also have the option to watch longer one-minute clips from each participant's rehearsal. This first round of voting will end on 16 November at 17:59 CET. The second phase of the online voting will take place during the live show and begin right after the last performance and will be open for 15 minutes. International viewers will be able to vote for three songs. They will also be able to vote for their own country's song. These votes will then be turned into points which will be determined by the percentage of votes received. For example, if a song receives 10% of the votes, it will receive 10% of the available points.

At the end of the show, Italy received 98 points, finishing in 9th place.

Points awarded to Italy
| Score | Country |
|---|---|
| 12 points | |
| 10 points | |
| 8 points | Armenia |
| 7 points | Malta |
| 6 points | Albania; Poland; San Marino |
| 5 points | |
| 4 points | Cyprus; Netherlands |
| 3 points | Estonia; Ukraine |
| 2 points | Portugal; Spain |
| 1 point | France |
Italy received 46 points from the online vote

Points awarded by Italy
| Score | Country |
|---|---|
| 12 points | Georgia |
| 10 points | Ukraine |
| 8 points | Portugal |
| 7 points | France |
| 6 points | Albania |
| 5 points | North Macedonia |
| 4 points | Spain |
| 3 points | Netherlands |
| 2 points | Estonia |
| 1 point | San Marino |

==== Detailed voting results ====
The following members comprised the Italian jury:

- Edmondo Anselmi
- Iros Lorenzo Guiati
- Michele Mo
- Lucia Margherita Marino
- Marta Lucia Coda Zabetta

Detailed voting results from Italy
| Draw | Country | Juror A | Juror B | Juror C | Juror D | Juror E | Rank | Points |
|---|---|---|---|---|---|---|---|---|
| 01 | Italy | | | | | | | |
| 02 | Estonia | 9 | 9 | 2 | 14 | 12 | 9 | 2 |
| 03 | Albania | 8 | 6 | 1 | 13 | 6 | 5 | 6 |
| 04 | Armenia | 6 | 10 | 11 | 7 | 15 | 12 | |
| 05 | Cyprus | 15 | 16 | 10 | 16 | 7 | 15 | |
| 06 | France | 5 | 2 | 12 | 11 | 2 | 4 | 7 |
| 07 | North Macedonia | 10 | 3 | 9 | 4 | 5 | 6 | 5 |
| 08 | Poland | 13 | 14 | 8 | 12 | 8 | 14 | |
| 09 | Georgia | 1 | 1 | 7 | 3 | 1 | 1 | 12 |
| 10 | Spain | 2 | 5 | 13 | 10 | 16 | 7 | 4 |
| 11 | Germany | 12 | 13 | 3 | 9 | 13 | 11 | |
| 12 | Netherlands | 14 | 7 | 4 | 6 | 11 | 8 | 3 |
| 13 | San Marino | 16 | 15 | 14 | 1 | 14 | 10 | 1 |
| 14 | Ukraine | 3 | 4 | 5 | 5 | 3 | 2 | 10 |
| 15 | Portugal | 4 | 8 | 6 | 2 | 4 | 3 | 8 |
| 16 | Ireland | 11 | 11 | 16 | 15 | 10 | 16 | |
| 17 | Malta | 7 | 12 | 15 | 8 | 9 | 13 | |
