= Netherlands in the Junior Eurovision Song Contest 2024 =

- Junior Eurovision Song Contest 2024
- Participating broadcaster: AVROTROS
- Country: Netherlands
- Selection process: Junior Songfestival 2024
- Selection date: 21 September 2024

Competing entry
- Song: "Music"
- Artist: Stay Tuned
- Songwriters: Jermain van der Bogt; Willem Laseroms

Placement
- Final result: 10th, 91 points

Participation chronology

The Netherlands was represented at the Junior Eurovision Song Contest 2024 with the song "Music", written by Jermain van der Bogt and Willem Laseroms, and performed by Stay Tuned. The Dutch participating broadcaster, AVROTROS, organised the national final Junior Songfestival 2024 in order to select its entry for the contest.

== Background ==
Prior to the 2024 contest, the Netherlands had participated in the contest twenty-one times since its first entry in the inaugural 2003 contest. Since then, the country has won the contest on one occasion in 2009 with the song "Click Clack" performed by Ralf Mackenbach. The Netherlands is the only country to have taken part in every edition of the contest. Since 2014, as the result of a merger between the AVRO – which had previously been in charge of the Netherlands' participation in the contest – and TROS into the current AVROTROS, it is the latter who participates representing the Netherlands. In 2023, Sep and Jasmijn competed for the Netherlands with the song "Holding On to You", which ended up in 7th place out of 16 entries with 122 points.

== Before Junior Eurovision ==
=== Junior Songfestival 2024 ===
Junior Songfestival 2024 was the twenty-first edition of Junior Songfestival, the national final format developed by AVROTROS to select Dutch entries for the Junior Eurovision Song Contest. The event was held on 21 September 2024 at the RTM Stage in Rotterdam, and was hosted by Matheu and Stefania. The show was broadcast on NPO Zapp via NPO 3, as well as on the broadcaster's streaming platform NPO Start.

==== Format ====
The selection took place in four stages: the received applications were first assessed by an expert committee; 45 were selected to be performed at an audition round, excerpts of which were published to the competition's official YouTube channel on 5 and 19 April, and 3 May 2024, where a jury selected twenty artists to advance to the academy; at the academy, the singers had the opportunity to work with vocal coaches and choreographers, after which the nine finalists were determined, who were later grouped into four acts, each of them being assigned original songs written by established songwriting groups; at the final, which was held on 21 September 2024, the winner was determined by a combination of votes from an kids jury (traditionally made up of past Junior Songfestival participants), a professional jury (made up of industry professionals) and an online vote – each awarding sets of 8–10 and 12 points – with the latter taking precedence in the event of a tie.

==== Competing entries ====
The submission process for interested artists aged between nine and fourteen was open between 23 September 2023 and 31 January 2024. All submissions required participants to enter one cover song and a separate introduction video. An expert committee reviewed the received submissions and selected 45 of them (including 29 which qualified directly, announced on 12 February 2024, and 16 which advanced from the preselection – a second chance round, where an additional 48 artists who hadn't advanced were invited to perform, after which some were invited for the audition, announced on 27 February 2024) to proceed to the audition round. Auditionee and eventual finalist Veronika had previously competed in the Ukrainian national final in 2021, placing third. The finalists were revealed on 31 May 2024, while the groupings were unveiled on 14 June 2024. One-minute snippets of the songs published on 29 June 2024, with the songs released daily between 2 and 5 July 2024.

Artist	Song	Songwriter(s)
Hidde, Saïda and Dunyah	"In m'n Prime"	Daniel van der Molen; Elke Tiel; Stas Swaczyna
Ruben	"Colors of My Heart"	Didier de Ruyter; Kirsten Michel
Stay Tuned	"Music"	Jermain van der Bogt; Willem Laseroms
Veronika	"Dreams Are Built to Last"	Nienke van der Velden; Rens Koppe; Tjeerd van Zanen

==== Final ====
The final took place on 21 September 2024. The kids jury panel consisted of Junior Songfestival 2023 participants Joy! and Sep & Jasmijn, while the professional jury panel, the members of which also provided feedback in regards to the performances during the show, consisted of singers Anne Appelo, Jim Bakkum and Roxeanne Hazes. In addition to the competing entries, the finalists performed a common song entitled "Move On". Stay Tuned – a group consisting of fourteen-year-old Chiara, twelve-year-olds Inkar and Miucha, and thirteen-year-old Niek – were declared the winners with the song "Music".

Final – 21 September 2024
Draw	Artist	Song	Kids jury	Prof. jury	Online vote	Total	Place
1	Hidde, Saïda and Dunyah	"In m'n Prime"	9	8	9	26	3
2	Veronika	"Dreams Are Built to Last"	10	12	10	32	2
3	Stay Tuned	"Music"	12	10	12	34	1
4	Ruben	"Colors of My Heart"	8	9	8	25	4

=== Promotion ===
As part of the promotion of their participation in the contest, Stay Tuned performed at Het Grote Junior Songfestival Concert, a retrospective celebration event with performances by past participants of Junior Songfestival, in Rotterdam on 26 October 2024.

== At Junior Eurovision ==
The Junior Eurovision Song Contest 2024 is set to take place at Caja Mágica in Madrid, Spain on 16 November 2024. The Netherlands will perform 12th, following Germany and preceding San Marino.

=== Voting ===
The same voting system that was introduced in the 2017 edition was used, where the results were determined by 50% online voting and 50% jury voting. Every participating broadcaster assembled a national jury that consisted of three music industry professionals and two children aged between 10 and 15 who were citizens of the country they represented. The rankings of those jurors were combined to make an overall top ten.

The online voting consisted of two phases. The first phase of the online voting began on 15 November 2024 when a recap of all the rehearsal performances was shown on the contest's website Junioreurovision.tv before the viewers could vote. After this, voters also had the option to watch longer one-minute clips from each participant's rehearsal. This first round of voting ended on 16 November at 17:59 CET. The second phase of the online voting took place during the live show and began right after the last performance and was open for 15 minutes. International viewers were able to vote for three songs. They were also able to vote for their own country's song. These votes were then turned into points which were determined by the percentage of votes received. For example, if a song received 10% of the votes, it received 10% of the available points.

At the end of the show, Netherlands received 34 points from juries and 57 points from online voting, placing 10th.

Points awarded to Netherlands
Score	Country
12 points	
10 points	
8 points	
7 points	Armenia
6 points	
5 points	San Marino
4 points	Ireland; North Macedonia
3 points	Cyprus; Georgia; Italy; Poland
2 points	
1 point	Albania; Malta
Netherlands received 57 points from the online vote

Points awarded by Netherlands
Score	Country
12 points	Georgia
10 points	France
8 points	Ukraine
7 points	Armenia
6 points	Portugal
5 points	Spain
4 points	Italy
3 points	Malta
2 points	Albania
1 point	North Macedonia

==== Detailed voting results ====
The following members comprised the Dutch jury:

- Arnan Samson
- Maurice Wijnen
- Sep Jansen
- Jasmijn Torrico
- Jazz Fafié

Detailed voting results from Netherlands
Draw	Country	Juror A	Juror B	Juror C	Juror D	Juror E	Rank	Points
01	Italy	7	6	6	9	7	7	4
02	Estonia	13	13	14	13	15	15	
03	Albania	10	9	7	12	13	9	2
04	Armenia	8	3	2	5	3	4	7
05	Cyprus	9	14	13	14	11	14	
06	France	4	4	3	2	2	2	10
07	North Macedonia	12	12	12	6	14	10	1
08	Poland	14	10	10	15	9	13	
09	Georgia	1	2	4	1	1	1	12
10	Spain	6	5	1	10	5	6	5
11	Germany	15	15	8	11	8	11	
12	Netherlands							
13	San Marino	16	16	16	16	16	16	
14	Ukraine	2	1	9	7	4	3	8
15	Portugal	3	7	5	3	6	5	6
16	Ireland	11	11	15	8	10	12	
17	Malta	5	8	11	4	12	8	3
