= Ukraine in the Junior Eurovision Song Contest 2024 =

- Junior Eurovision Song Contest 2024
- Participating broadcaster: Public Broadcasting Company of Ukraine (Suspilne)
- Country: Ukraine
- Selection process: Natsvidbir na Dytiache Yevrobachennia – 2024
- Selection date: 22 September 2024

Competing entry
- Song: "Hear Me Now"
- Artist: Artem Kotenko
- Songwriters: Svitlana Tarabarova

Placement
- Final result: 3rd, 203 points

Participation chronology

Ukraine was represented at the Junior Eurovision Song Contest 2024 with the song "Hear Me Now", written by Svitlana Tarabarova and performed by Artem Kotenko. The Ukrainian participating broadcaster, Suspilne, selected its entry, originally titled "Dim", through the national final Natsvidbir na Dytiache Yevrobachennia – 2024.

== Background ==
Prior to the 2024 contest, Ukraine had participated in the contest eighteen times since its first entry in the 2006 contest. Since then, the country has won the contest on one occasion in 2012 with the song "Nebo" performed by Anastasiya Petryk. The nation originally opted not to take part in the contest in 2018 (due to financial and structural difficulties), but would later be added to the list of participating countries. In 2023, Anastasiia Dymyd competed for Ukraine with the song "Kvitka", which ended up in 5th place out of 16 entries with 128 points.

== Before Junior Eurovision ==
=== Natsvidbir na Dytiache Yevrobachennia – 2024 ===
Natsvidbir na Dytiache Yevrobachennia – 2024 was the national final format developed by Suspilne in order to select Ukraine's entry for the Junior Eurovision Song Contest 2024. The competition consisted of a final held on 22 September 2024, hosted by Anna Trincher, Anna Tulieva and Timur Miroshnychenko. The show was broadcast on Suspilne Kultura, as well as on Suspilne's online platforms. The slogan for the competition was "Mrii smilyvo!" ("Dream boldly!").

==== Format ====
The selection of the competing entries for the national final took place over three stages. In the first stage, artists could apply for the competition through an online submission form. For the second year in a row, Svitlana Tarabarova was the music producer of the event, who was in charge of reviewing the received submissions and selecting a longlist of 15 participants, announced on 24 July 2024. In the second stage, longlisted artists were assessed by a three-member expert council consisting of Michelle Andrade, Tayanna and Yevhen Khmara alongside competition producers Tarabarova, Yevhen Kot and Yevhen Triplov at an event labeled as the "star school", which took place at the Recording House of Radio Ukraine in Kyiv in late July 2024, with ten acts, announced on 2 September 2024, proceeding further in the competition, and eventually six acts, announced on 8 September, qualifying for the final. The third stage consisted of Suspilne assigning specially-made songs written by Tarabarova and Triplov – the head songwriters of the competition; no original song submitted by a competing artist made the final.

The "star school" and finalist selection process were documented in the show Shchodennyky Dytiachoho Yevrobachennia ("Junior Eurovision diaries"), consisting of six broadcasts hosted by Miroshnychenko and Tulieva and aired weekly on Suspilne Kultura between 16 August and 22 September 2024. The six selected artists took part in a final on 22 September 2024, where the winner was determined by a 50/50 combination of jury and public votes – the latter being cast through the Diia application over two phases of voting and taking precedence in the event of a tie.

==== Competing entries ====
The submission process for interested artists aged between nine and fourteen was open between 5 June and 3 July 2024. All submissions required participants to enter covers of two songs and a separate introduction video; however, artists were also allowed to submit original songs for consideration. Precedence was not given to complete submissions, with Suspilne also reserving the right to replace a song submitted by an eventual finalist with a new entry of its choice if such a case was to occur. At the closing of the submission process, 309 applications had been received. The songs were released on the official Eurovision Ukraine YouTube channel on 16 September.

Longlisted artists
Artist	Top 10	Top 6	Result
Anastasiia Bielibova	Yes		Finalist
Anhelina Hlohus	Yes		Finalist
Anna Doina	Yes	No	Eliminated
Artem Kotenko	Yes		Finalist
Bohdan Bilukha	No	—N/a	Eliminated
Daryna Vitsan	No	—N/a	Eliminated
Illia Konovchenko	Yes		Finalist
Mariia Blyzniuk	Yes	No	Eliminated
Sofiia Nersesian	Yes	No	Eliminated
Veronika Kohan	Yes		Finalist
Vladyslav Vasytskyi	No	—N/a	Eliminated
Vladyslava Kitseliuk	No	—N/a	Eliminated
Vsevolod Skryma	Yes	No	Eliminated
Zlata Ivaniv	Yes		Finalist
Zlata Solonenko	No	—N/a	Eliminated

Natsvidbir na Dytiache Yevrobachennia – 2024 participating entries
Artist	Song	Songwriter(s)
Anastasiia Bielibova	"Unbelievable"	Yevhen Triplov
Anhelina Hlohus	"Plachut yanholy" (Плачуть янголи)	Yevhen Triplov
Artem Kotenko	"Dim" (Дім)	Svitlana Tarabarova
Illia Konovchenko	"Spaceship"	Svitlana Tarabarova
Veronika Kohan	"Harmony"	Yevhen Triplov
Zlata Ivaniv	"Namysto" (Намисто)	Svitlana Tarabarova

==== Final ====
The final took place on 22 September 2024. The members of the jury were Andrii Hutsuliak (represented Ukraine in the Eurovision Song Contest 2023 as part of Tvorchi), Roxolana (singer-songwriter, finalist of Vidbir 2022) and Vitalii Drozdov (radio producer, general producer of TAVR Media Radio Holding). In addition to the competing entries, the guest performers included Roxolana with "Ne stii pid viknom", Tvorchi with "Dubidu", Anastasiia Dymyd and the Ukrainian Radio Symphony Orchestra with "Kvitka", Anna Trincher with "Ochi", and Jerry Heil with "#AllEyesOnKids", after which the finalists performed a common song titled "Pure and Beautiful" alongside Tarabarova.

Final – 22 September 2024
Draw	Artist	Song	Jury	Public vote		Total	Place
Draw	Artist	Song	Jury	Votes	Points	Total	Place
1	Illia Konovchenko	"Spaceship"	2	3,003	2	4	5
2	Anastasiia Bielibova	"Unbelievable"	4	5,296	4	8	3
3	Veronika Kohan	"Harmony"	3	3,113	3	6	4
4	Zlata Ivaniv	"Namysto"	6	8,712	5	11	2
5	Artem Kotenko	"Dim"	5	12,661	6	11	1
6	Anhelina Hlohus	"Plachut yanholy"	1	2,716	1	2	6

=== Preparation and cyberbullying campaign ===
On 6 October 2024, Kotenko revealed the title of his entry would be changed from "Dim" to "Hear Me Now" for the contest in order for the "message of the song [to] be understood by everyone in Europe".

On 31 October 2024, Suspilne reported that a cyberbullying campaign targeting Kotenko was being carried out by Russian web brigades in an effort to undermine promotional activities of the Ukrainian delegation, with Tarabarova calling on Ukrainians to show support for Kotenko on social media to help counter the harassment.

== At Junior Eurovision ==
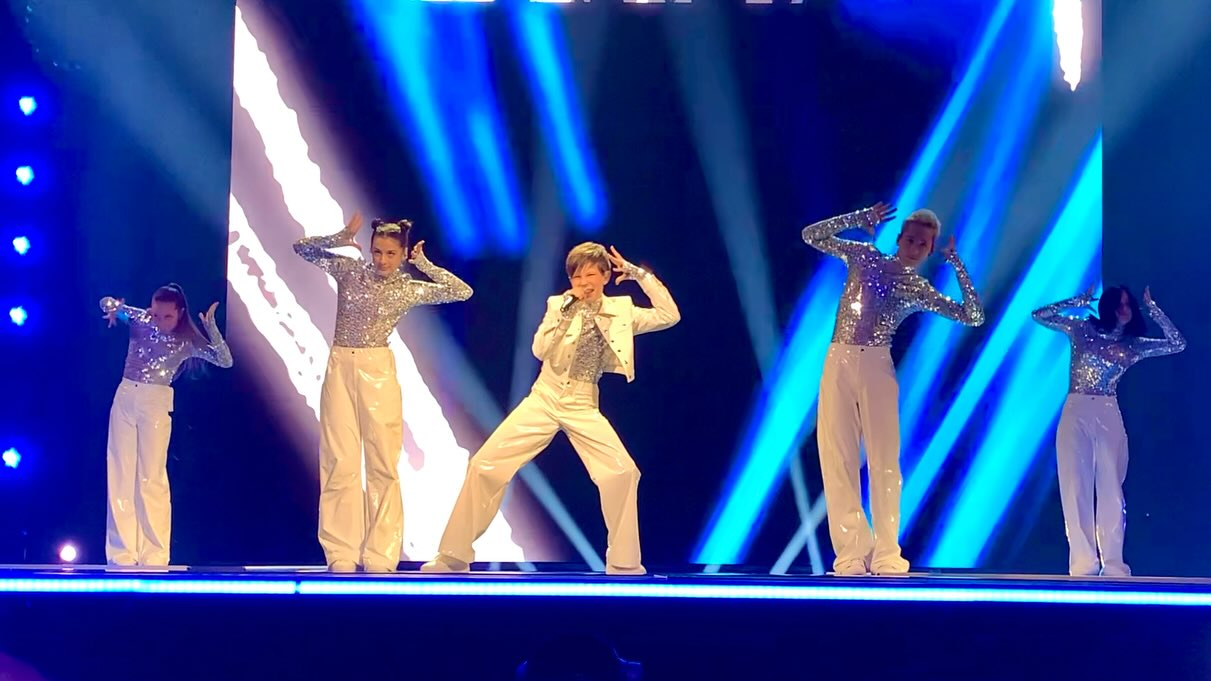
Artem Kotenko performing on stage during the Jury Show

The Junior Eurovision Song Contest 2024 took place at Caja Mágica in Madrid, Spain on 16 November 2024. Ukraine performed 14th, following San Marino and preceding Portugal.

=== Voting ===
The same voting system that was introduced in the 2017 edition was used, where the results were determined by 50% online voting and 50% jury voting. Every participating broadcaster assembled a national jury that consisted of three music industry professionals and two children aged between 10 and 15 who were citizens of the country they represented. The rankings of those jurors were combined to make an overall top ten.

The online voting consisted of two phases. The first phase of the online voting began on 15 November 2024 when a recap of all the rehearsal performances was shown on the contest's website Junioreurovision.tv before the viewers could vote. After this, voters also had the option to watch longer one-minute clips from each participant's rehearsal. This first round of voting ended on 16 November at 17:59 CET. The second phase of the online voting took place during the live show and began right after the last performance and was open for 15 minutes. International viewers were able to vote for three songs. They were also able to vote for their own country's song. These votes were then turned into points which were determined by the percentage of votes received. For example, if a song received 10% of the votes, it received 10% of the available points.

At the end of the show, Ukraine received 122 points from juries and 81 points from online voting, placing 3rd.

Points awarded to Ukraine
Score	Country
12 points	North Macedonia; Poland
10 points	Albania; France; Italy; Malta; Spain
8 points	Cyprus; Netherlands
7 points	Estonia; Ireland; Portugal
6 points	
5 points	Georgia
4 points	San Marino
3 points	
2 points	Germany
1 point	
Ukraine received 81 points from the online vote

Points awarded by Ukraine
Score	Country
12 points	Georgia
10 points	Spain
8 points	Albania
7 points	Malta
6 points	France
5 points	Armenia
4 points	Portugal
3 points	Italy
2 points	Poland
1 point	Cyprus

==== Detailed voting results ====
The following members comprised the Ukrainian jury:

- Denys Hryshchuk
- Herman Nienov
- Mariana Voronina
- Mishel Stefani Andrade Chekasina
- Zlata Ivaniv

Detailed voting results from Ukraine
Draw	Country	Juror A	Juror B	Juror C	Juror D	Juror E	Rank	Points
01	Italy	8	3	9	13	10	8	3
02	Estonia	14	12	10	9	14	13	
03	Albania	1	6	7	1	3	3	8
04	Armenia	6	7	4	4	8	6	5
05	Cyprus	9	8	11	7	15	10	1
06	France	5	1	12	6	5	5	6
07	North Macedonia	13	11	13	10	9	12	
08	Poland	12	14	5	11	7	9	2
09	Georgia	3	2	1	2	4	1	12
10	Spain	2	5	2	3	1	2	10
11	Germany	11	9	8	12	11	11	
12	Netherlands	10	10	14	14	12	14	
13	San Marino	16	15	16	16	16	16	
14	Ukraine							
15	Portugal	7	4	6	8	6	7	4
16	Ireland	15	13	15	15	13	15	
17	Malta	4	16	3	5	2	4	7
