= Spain in the Junior Eurovision Song Contest 2024 =

- Junior Eurovision Song Contest 2024
- Participating broadcaster: Radiotelevisión Española (RTVE)
- Country: Spain
- Selection process: Internal selection
- Announcement date: Artist: 18 July 2024; Song: 7 October 2024

Competing entry
- Song: "Como la Lola"
- Artist: Chloe DelaRosa
- Songwriters: Alejandro Martínez; Chloe DelaRosa; David Parejo; Luis Ramiro

Placement
- Final result: 6th, 144 points

Participation chronology

Spain was represented at the Junior Eurovision Song Contest 2024 with the song "Como la Lola", written by Alejandro Martínez, Chloe DelaRosa, David Parejo, and Luis Ramiro, and performed by Chloe DelaRosa herself. The Spanish participating broadcaster, Radiotelevisión Española (RTVE), internally selected its entry for the contest. In addition, RTVE was also the host broadcaster and staged the event at the Caja Mágica in Madrid, after the previous year's winner, France Télévisions, refused to host the contest for the third time in four years.

== Background ==
Prior to the 2024 contest, Televisión Española (TVE) until 2006, and Radiotelevisión Española (RTVE) since 2019, had participated in the Junior Eurovision Song Contest representing Spain nine times. They came second on their debut appearance in 2003 with the song "Desde el cielo" performed by Sergio, and won the contest the following year with the song "Antes muerta que sencilla" performed by María Isabel. TVE decided to take an indefinite break from the contest after the 2006 contest, with a broadcaster representative stating "Junior Eurovision promotes stereotypes [they] do not share". RTVE returned after a 13-year absence in 2019. Their return proved successful, with "Marte" by Melani García in 2019 and "Palante" by Soleá in 2020 both reaching third place. In 2023, "Loviu" performed by Sandra Valero, ended up in 2nd place out of 16 entries with 201 points.

Following the refusal of French broadcaster France Télévisions to host the Junior Eurovision Song Contest for the third time in four years, the European Broadcasting Union (EBU) offered RTVE, which finished in second place in 2023, to host the contest, which it ultimately accepted. They announced the decision on 14 February 2024, with the Caja Mágica in Madrid announced as the venue on 10 May 2024.

== Before Junior Eurovision ==
=== Internal selection ===
RTVE internally selected its entry for the Junior Eurovision Song Contest 2024. The broadcaster opened a submission process for interested artists aged between nine and fourteen on 14 May 2024. All submissions required participants to enter covers of two songs, with applications open until 3 July 2024. It was previously anticipated in February 2024 that the selection method for the song and artist would follow a similar casting format to 2022 and 2023, while on 10 May 2024 it was revealed that the song would be selected afterwards from a pool of entries submitted by "a large group of [both] national and international composers" and later recorded in September, with suitability to the vocal abilities and style of the selected artist having been reported to be one of the main criteria in the song selection process. Upon closing the submission period, Benidorm Fest 2024 artistic director César Vallejo announced that nearly 300 applications had been submitted; the precise number was later revealed to be 290.

Following an audition round held on 16 July 2024 at Prado del Rey in Pozuelo de Alarcón, Madrid, an expert jury panel appointed by RTVE determined their eventual representative; among the shortlisted acts was Gonzalo Pinillos, who would go on to represent Spain in 2025. Chloe DelaRosa was announced as the Spanish representative for the contest on 18 July 2024 during a presentation event held in the presence of RTVE's head of communications María Eizaguirre, the head of the Spanish delegation to the contest Ana María Bordas, and Vallejo.

On 7 October 2024, RTVE presented the song "Como la Lola", which was written by Alejandro Martínez, David Parejo, Luis Ramiro and DelaRosa herself. The song is a tribute to Lola Flores.

== At Junior Eurovision ==
RTVE hosted and staged the Junior Eurovision Song Contest 2024 at the Caja Mágica in Madrid on 16 November 2024. During the Heads of Delegation meeting on 1 October 2024, Spain was drawn be the 10th country to perform.

=== Voting ===
The same voting system that was introduced in the 2017 edition was used, where the results were determined by 50% online voting and 50% jury voting. Every participating broadcaster assembled a national jury that consisted of three music industry professionals and two children aged between 10 and 15 who were citizens of the country they represented. The rankings of those jurors were combined to make an overall top ten.

The online voting consisted of two phases. The first phase of the online voting began on 15 November 2024 when a recap of all the rehearsal performances was shown on the contest's website Junioreurovision.tv before the viewers could vote. After this, voters also had the option to watch longer one-minute clips from each participant's rehearsal. This first round of voting ended on 16 November at 17:59 CET. The second phase of the online voting took place during the live show and began right after the last performance and was open for 15 minutes. International viewers were able to vote for three songs. They were also able to vote for their own country's song. These votes were then turned into points which were determined by the percentage of votes received. For example, if a song received 10% of the votes, it received 10% of the available points.

"Como la Lola" placed 6th with 144 points.

Points awarded to Spain
Score	Country
12 points	
10 points	Cyprus; Ukraine
8 points	Georgia; San Marino
7 points	Albania
6 points	North Macedonia
5 points	Estonia; Ireland; Netherlands
4 points	Italy
3 points	France; Germany; Portugal
2 points	Malta
1 point	Armenia
Spain received 64 points from the online vote

Points awarded by Spain
Score	Country
12 points	Georgia
10 points	Ukraine
8 points	Portugal
7 points	Malta
6 points	Albania
5 points	France
4 points	Armenia
3 points	Ireland
2 points	Italy
1 point	Estonia

==== Detailed voting results ====
The following members comprised the Spanish jury:

- Juan Carlos Arauzo Olivares
- Juan Sebastián Domínguez Morillo
- Blanca Miralles Rodríguez
- Carmen Molina
- Soleá Fernández Moreno

Detailed voting results from Spain
Draw	Country	Juror A	Juror B	Juror C	Juror D	Juror E	Rank	Points
01	Italy	12	13	9	3	9	9	2
02	Estonia	13	4	6	12	12	10	1
03	Albania	10	15	1	2	5	5	6
04	Armenia	6	14	7	7	7	7	4
05	Cyprus	14	5	11	14	13	15	
06	France	5	12	5	11	4	6	5
07	North Macedonia	11	7	15	10	10	14	
08	Poland	15	11	14	8	15	16	
09	Georgia	4	16	2	1	1	1	12
10	Spain							
11	Germany	9	9	12	9	11	13	
12	Netherlands	7	8	10	13	6	11	
13	San Marino	16	1	16	16	16	12	
14	Ukraine	2	10	3	4	2	2	10
15	Portugal	1	6	8	6	3	3	8
16	Ireland	8	2	13	15	14	8	3
17	Malta	3	3	4	5	8	4	7
