= Poland in the Junior Eurovision Song Contest 2024 =

- Junior Eurovision Song Contest 2024
- Participating broadcaster: Telewizja Polska (TVP)
- Country: Poland
- Selection process: Artist: Szansa na sukces; Song: Internal selection
- Selection date: 29 September 2024

Competing entry
- Song: "All Together"
- Artist: Dominik Arim
- Songwriters: Aldona Dąbrowska; Sławomir Sokołowski

Placement
- Final result: 12th, 61 points

Participation chronology

Poland was represented at the Junior Eurovision Song Contest 2024 with the song "All Together", composed by Sławomir Sokołowski, with lyrics by Aldona Dąbrowska, and performed by Dominik Arim. The Polish participating broadcaster, Telewizja Polska (TVP), chose its entry through the national selection Szansa na sukces.

== Background ==
Prior to the 2024 contest, Poland had participated in the contest ten times. In 2003 and 2004, Poland finished in last place, and they decided not to participate from 2005 to 2015. The country returned in 2016. In both 2018 and 2019, Poland won the Junior Eurovision Song Contest with Roksana Węgiel and Viki Gabor respectively. In 2021, Sara James competed for Poland with the song "Somebody" which ended up in 2nd place, being 6 points short of winning the competition. In 2023, Maja Krzyżewska competed for Poland with the song "I Just Need a Friend", which ended up in 6th place out of 16 entries with 124 points.

In light of the 2023 Polish public media crisis, head of the Polish delegation for the contest Marta Piekarska reportedly assured that as long as "TVP trusts her", Poland would not withdraw from the Junior Eurovision Song Contest; she was later confirmed as a member of the contest's steering group, therefore confirming her involvement with the delegation for another year. In January 2024, a tender announcement was made by TVP in liquidation for the organisation of two traditional editions of Szansa na sukces that year – a spring edition, serving as the selection method for a newcomer spot at the Opole Festival, as well as an autumn edition held in relation to the Junior Eurovision Song Contest – thereby confirming it as the national final for the sixth year running.

== Before Junior Eurovision ==
=== Szansa na sukces ===
TVP selected the Polish representative with the television program Szansa na sukces (transl. Chance of Success); the same show has also been used for the Junior Eurovision Song Contest since 2019 and various times for the Eurovision Song Contest, directly or indirectly. (Note: The format has been involved at least thrice in the selection of the Polish representative in the Eurovision Song Contest. In 1995, the selection of Justyna to represent the country was partially motivated by her win in the first edition of Szansa na sukces; similarly, in 1996, Viola Brzezińska, who won the second edition, was initially selected to represent Poland, however she would be later replaced by Kasia Kowalska, while in 2020, a special edition of the format served as the selection method for the contest later that year.) Artur Orzech accepted a preliminary invitation to host the format following the takeover of Polish public media in late 2023. Casting for the show took place on 26 May 2024 at the TVP Headquarters in Warsaw, from which 21 acts were selected to advance to the competition.

==== Shows ====
===== Heats =====
The heats were recorded in early July 2024 and aired on 8, 15 and 22 September 2024. In each heat, seven semi-finalists performed cover versions of randomly drawn songs corresponding to the theme of the episode, and a two-member professional jury consisting of Viki Gabor – who won the 2019 contest for Poland – and Mietek Szcześniak – who represented Poland in the Eurovision Song Contest 1999 – in heat 1; Sara James – who represented Poland in the 2021 contest – and Luna – who represented Poland in the Eurovision Song Contest 2024 – in heat 2; and Cleo – who represented Poland in the Eurovision Song Contest 2014 alongside Donatan – and Maja Krzyżewska – who represented Poland in the 2023 contest – in heat 3 selected one finalist; TVP reserved the option to select wildcards among the non-qualifiers. The themes of the heats are "the latest hits" in heat 1, "Eurovision hits" in heat 2 and "casting songs" in heat 3.

Key: Jury finalist Wildcard finalist Honourable mention

Heat 1 – 8 September 2024
Draw	Artist	Song	Result
1	Łukasz Matyka	"Nie jest za późno"	Eliminated
2	Oliwia Bąk	"Cold Heart (Pnau remix)"	Eliminated
3	Julia Kuś	"We Can't Be Friends (Wait for Your Love)"	Eliminated
4	Tatiana Kopala	"Drivers License"	Eliminated
5	Blanka Korniluk	"Beautiful Things"	Advanced
6	Natan Gryga	"Lose Control"	Advanced
7	Igor Pochwała	"Och i ach"	Eliminated

Heat 2 – 15 September 2024
Draw	Artist	Song	Result
1	Kalina Kalicka	"Satellite"	Eliminated
2	Konrad Adamczyk	"Queen of Kings"	Eliminated
3	Iga Kaczyńska	"Heroes"	Eliminated
4	Sebastian Rąpel	"Arcade"	Eliminated
5	Aleksandra Antoniak	"The Tower"	Advanced
6	Dominik Arim	"Waterloo"	Advanced
7	Amelia Stawiarska	"Love Shine a Light"	Eliminated

Heat 3 – 22 September 2024
Draw	Artist	Song	Result
1	Nikodem Pajączek	"Jestem twoją bajką"	Eliminated
2	Maja Golańska	"Stone Cold"	Advanced
3	Filip Płażalski	"Tattoo"	Eliminated
4	Eryk Kucharski	"Kolorowy wiatr"	Eliminated
5	Antonina Smerkowska	"Hello"	Eliminated
6	Helena Ciuraba	"Flowers"	Eliminated
7	Helena Zaciewska	"Sztorm"	Eliminated

==== Final ====
The final took place on 29 September 2024.

Key: Winner

Final – First round – 29 September 2024
Draw	Artist	Song	Jury	Televote	Total	Place
1	Natan Gryga	"Fairytale"	1	7	8	3
2	Blanka Korniluk	"Heroes"	2	3	5	4
3	Aleksandra Antoniak	"Euphoria"	5	5	10	1
4	Dominik Arim	"Satellite"	7	2	9	2
5	Maja Golańska	"Snap"	3	1	4	5

Final – Second round – 29 September 2024
Draw	Artist	Song
1	Aleksandra Antoniak	"All Together"
2	Dominik Arim	"All Together"

== At Junior Eurovision ==
The Junior Eurovision Song Contest 2024 is set to take place at Caja Mágica in Madrid, Spain on 16 November 2024. Poland will perform 8th, following North Macedonia and preceding Georgia.

=== Voting ===
The same voting system that was introduced in the 2017 edition was used, where the results were determined by 50% online voting and 50% jury voting. Every participating broadcaster assembled a national jury that consisted of three music industry professionals and two children aged between 10 and 15 who were citizens of the country they represented. The rankings of those jurors were combined to make an overall top ten.

The online voting consisted of two phases. The first phase of the online voting began on 15 November 2024 when a recap of all the rehearsal performances was shown on the contest's website Junioreurovision.tv before the viewers could vote. After this, voters also had the option to watch longer one-minute clips from each participant's rehearsal. This first round of voting ended on 16 November at 17:59 CET. The second phase of the online voting took place during the live show and began right after the last performance and was open for 15 minutes. International viewers were able to vote for three songs. They were also able to vote for their own country's song. These votes were then turned into points which were determined by the percentage of votes received. For example, if a song received 10% of the votes, it received 10% of the available points.

At the end of the show, Poland received 13 points from juries and 48 points from online voting, placing 12th.

Points awarded to Poland
Score	Country
12 points	
10 points	
8 points	Portugal
7 points	
6 points	
5 points	
4 points	
3 points	Ireland
2 points	Ukraine
1 point	
Poland received 48 points from the online vote

Points awarded by Poland
Score	Country
12 points	Ukraine
10 points	Portugal
8 points	Georgia
7 points	France
6 points	Italy
5 points	Albania
4 points	North Macedonia
3 points	Netherlands
2 points	Armenia
1 point	Germany

==== Detailed voting results ====
The following members comprised the Polish jury:

- Natan Gryga
- Robert Janowski
- Aleksandra Antoniak
- Marta Dywicka
- Monika Wydrzyńska

Detailed voting results from Poland
Draw	Country	Juror A	Juror B	Juror C	Juror D	Juror E	Rank	Points
01	Italy	7	3	7	7	9	5	6
02	Estonia	14	10	11	13	8	14	
03	Albania	4	9	3	8	14	6	5
04	Armenia	8	12	6	14	5	9	2
05	Cyprus	13	15	15	10	16	15	
06	France	5	8	4	3	7	4	7
07	North Macedonia	9	5	14	4	11	7	4
08	Poland							
09	Georgia	1	13	5	6	2	3	8
10	Spain	15	14	8	9	4	12	
11	Germany	10	6	13	5	10	10	1
12	Netherlands	12	4	9	12	6	8	3
13	San Marino	16	16	16	16	15	16	
14	Ukraine	6	1	1	1	1	1	12
15	Portugal	2	2	2	2	3	2	10
16	Ireland	11	7	10	15	12	13	
17	Malta	3	11	12	11	13	11	
