= Andria Putkaradze =

Georgian child singer (born 2013)

Andria Putkaradze ანდრია ფუტკარაძე
- Born: 11 June 2013 (age 12); Batumi, Georgia
- Occupation: Singer
- Years active: 2024–present

Andria Putkaradze (Georgian: ანდრია ფუტკარაძე; born 11 June 2013) is a Georgian child singer. He began his career as the winner of the seventh season of Ranina, and then later won the Junior Eurovision Song Contest 2024 for Georgia with the song "To My Mom", becoming the fourth Georgian entrant to win the contest.

== Biography ==
=== Early life ===
Putkaradze was born in Batumi, Georgia, on 11 June 2013. He started singing at the age of two. Four years later, the artist became a member of the vocal ensemble Zghvis Shvilebis (Georgian: ზღვის შვილების). As of 2024, he studied piano at the Zakaria Paliashvili Music School in Batumi.

His mother, Shorena Abashidze, is an emigrant living in Brooklyn, New York City, United States, resulting in Putkaradze being raised by his grandparents. According to the singer himself, his parents separated before he was three years old, adding that the father went abroad.

=== 2024–2025: Ranina, Junior Eurovision Song Contest, and participation in shows ===
Putkaradze began his professional music career in 2024, participating in the seventh season of the children's talent show Ranina (Georgian: რანინა). He eventually won the competition.

Ranina performances and results (2024)
Episode	Song	Final	Points	Ref.
Tour 1, Show 1	"Varsk'vlavebi" (Note: Performed with Demetre Okriashvili, Barbare Makhatadze, Datuna Kereselidze, Anastasia Masurashvili and Mariam Gomiashvili.) "ვარსკვლავები"	1st	117	
Tour 2, Show 3	"Chems simgheras vin gaigebs" "ჩემს სიმღერას ვინ გაიგებს"	1st	120	
Tour 3, Show 5	"Si ko uli bat'a" "სი ქო ული ბატა"	1st	120	
Tour 4, Show 7	"Cinema Paradiso"	1st	120	
Semi-Final	"Baghdaduri" "ბაღდადური"	Advanced		
Grand Final	"K'idevats daizrdebin" "კიდევაც დაიზრდებინ"	Winner		

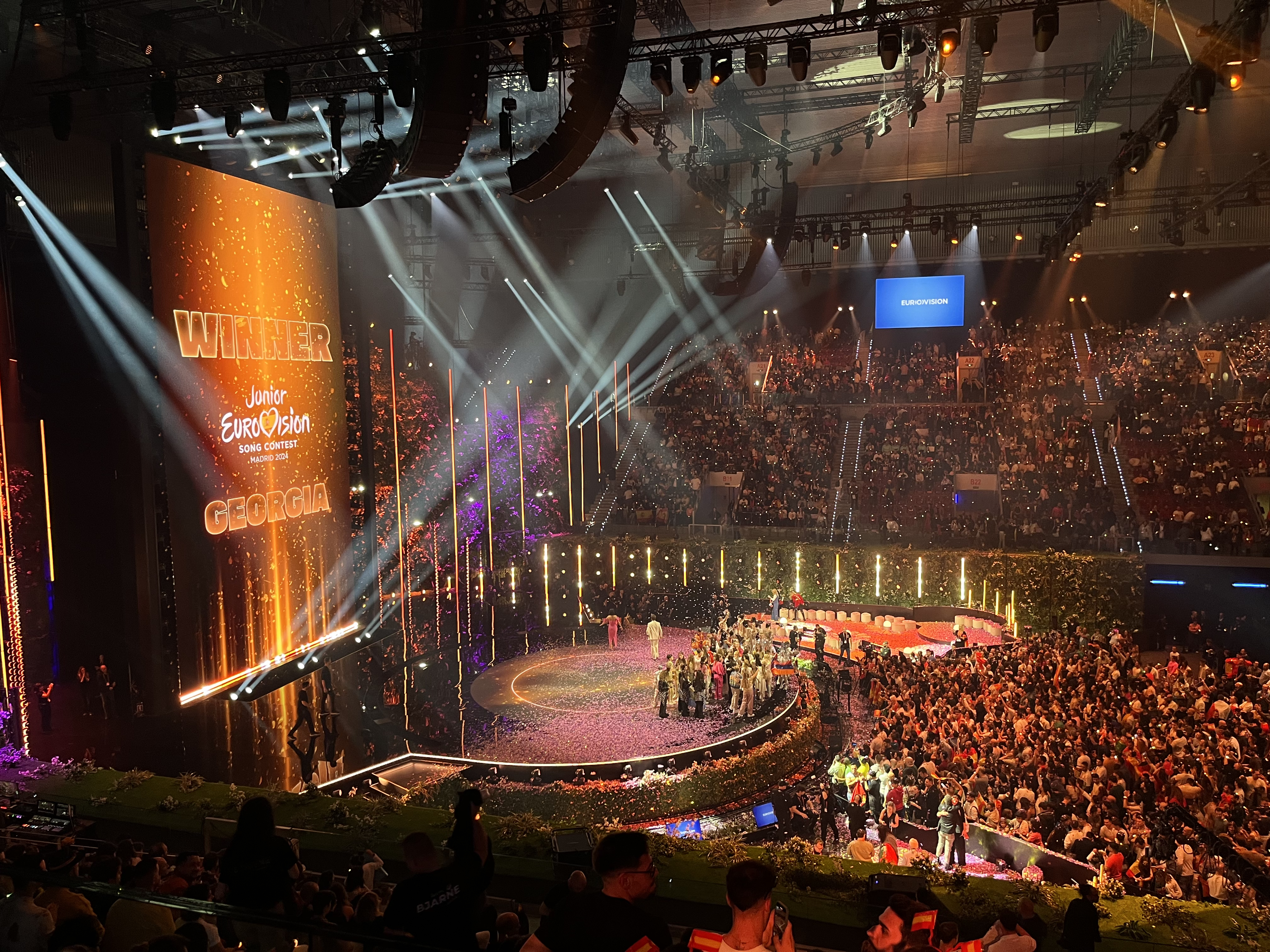
Participants on stage immediately after Putkaradze's win at the Junior Eurovision Song Contest 2024.

On 30 July 2024, the artist was announced as the Georgian representative for the Junior Eurovision Song Contest 2024 in Madrid, Spain, receiving a special certificate and congratulations from the director of the Georgian Public Broadcaster (GPB) Tinatin Berdzenishvili. His song was later revealed to be titled "To My Mom" and presented with an accompanying music video on 13 October, with the official release following on 22 October. It was also publicised that the singer would be joined on stage by Gabriel Machabeli (who was a ten-year-old at the time of the announcement). On 16 November in the Junior Eurovision live show, Putkaradze won the competition with a total of 239 points. He is the fourth Georgian entrant to win the Junior Eurovision Song Contest.

A few days after returning to Georgia and then Batumi, Putkaradze and his mother flew to France to take advantage of the trip to Disneyland Paris given to him as a prize for winning Ranina.

In January 2025, he became a participant of the special New Year's edition of the show Mart'ivilogik'a (Georgian: მარტივილოგიკა).

Four months later, in May 2025, the singer travelled to Basel, Switzerland, where he performed the song "Freedom" together with its performer Mariam Shengelia as part of the Georgian Culture Day in the city, organised by the Georgian Embassy in Switzerland with the support of the Ministries of Foreign Affairs and Culture.

In June 2025, he was revealed to be one of the guests at the Irena Santor "Vistula Sounds" International Festival in Ciechocinek, Kuyavian–Pomeranian Voivodeship, Poland, between 12 and 16 August.

== Discography ==
=== Singles ===
Title	Year	Album or EP	Length	Ref.
"To My Mom"	2024	Non-album singles	2:58	

== Videography ==
=== Music videos ===
Title	Year	Director(s)	Ref.
"To My Mom"	2024	—	

== Notes ==
Awards and achievements
Preceded by (France) Zoé Clauzure with "Cœur"	Winner of the Junior Eurovision Song Contest; 2024	Succeeded by (France) Lou Deleuze with "Ce monde"
Preceded by Anastasia & Ranina with "Over the Sky"	Georgia in the Junior Eurovision Song Contest; 2024	Succeeded by Anita Abgariani with "Shine Like a Star"
