= Gogi Dolidze =

Giorgi (Gogi) Dolidze (Georgian: გოგი დოლიძე; 5 September 1954 Tbilisi, Georgia – 8 March 1996) was a Georgian singer.

Dolidze graduated from Chavchavadze State Pedagogical Institute of Foreign Languages in 1976. From 1979 until his death, he worked in the editorial office of the Radio Corporation of Folk Art. Dolidze gained popularity from 1980 to 1990 as a solo singer. Dolidze's well-known songs include "Georgians Dolidze & Sword", "While the King of Love", "Even Daizrdebian", and "Christmas song".

In 1999, Dolidze was nominated for Best Video of the Twentieth Century. At Tbilisi School No. 24, the primary school where he studied, his bust was erected. He was also honored with the title Artist of Georgia, State Prize Laureate (posthumously, 1998).
