= Portugal in the Junior Eurovision Song Contest =

- Junior Eurovision Song Contest
- Participating broadcaster: Rádio e Televisão de Portugal (RTP)

Participation summary
- Appearances: 11
- First appearance: 2006
- Highest placement: 2nd: 2024
- Participation history: 2006; 2007; 2008 – 2016; 2017; 2018; 2019; 2020; 2021; 2022; 2023; 2024; 2025; 2026
- For the most recent participation see Portugal in the Junior Eurovision Song Contest 2026

Portugal has been represented at the Junior Eurovision Song Contest since 2006, and includes a total of eleven appearances. The Portuguese participating broadcaster in the contest is Rádio e Televisão de Portugal (RTP). It was not represented at the contest between 2008 and 2016, their longest absence run, and in 2020. Its first entry was "Deixa-me sentir" by Pedro Madeira, which finished in second-last place out of fifteen entries. Its worst result to date came in 2018 when "Gosto de tudo (já não gosto de nada)" by Rita Laranjeira placed 18th out of 20 entries. Its current best result is a second place obtained with "Esperança" by Victoria Nicole at the 2024 edition.

== History ==
Portugal has sent eight entries to the contest, first entering in 2006. Portugal finished second-last in both 2006 and 2007, and Portuguese broadcaster Rádio e Televisão de Portugal (RTP) withdrew after the 2007 contest, despite high viewing figures. On 28 July 2014, it was announced that Portugal would return in 2014, but on 4 September 2014 it was announced that they ultimately would not participate. Portugal returned in 2017 and has participated until 2019. Portugal provisionally confirmed their participation in the 2020 contest, but did not appear on the final list of participants, because COVID-19. Portugal returned in 2021 with Simão Oliveira, who came 11th, giving Portugal their best result up to that point. This achievement was then surpassed in 2022, when Portugal came 8th with Nicolas Alves and the song ‘Anos 70’, which was also the first entry sung entirely in Brazilian Portuguese dialect. The following year, Portuguese-American singer Júlia Machado came 13th out of 16 with 75 points, achieving Portugal's fourth-best result in Junior Eurovision.

In 2024, Portugal achieved their best result to date, with Victoria Nicole and the song ''Esperança'' placing 2nd, with 213 points. For the 2025 contest, RTP selected Inês Gonçalves – via the 6th season of "The Voice Kids," with the song "Para onde vai o amor?." Gonçalves would end up placing 13th with 73 points in Tbilisi.

== Participation overview ==
Table key
2	Second place

Year	Artist	Song	Language	Place	Points
2006	Pedro Madeira	"Deixa-me sentir"	Portuguese	14	22
2007	Jorge Leiria	"Só quero é cantar"	Portuguese	16	15
2017	Mariana Venâncio	"Youtuber"	Portuguese	14	54
2018	Rita Laranjeira	"Gosto de tudo (já não gosto de nada)"	Portuguese	18	42
2019	Joana Almeida	"Vem comigo (Come with Me)"	Portuguese, English	16	43
2021	Simão Oliveira	"O rapaz"	Portuguese	11	101
2022	Nicolas Alves	"Anos 70"	Portuguese	8	121
2023	Júlia Machado	"Where I Belong"	Portuguese, English	13	75
2024	Victoria Nicole	"Esperança"	Portuguese, Spanish	2	213
2025	Inês Gonçalves	"Para onde vai o amor?"	Portuguese	13	73
2026	Salvador Rio	"Alma"	Portuguese	13	64

== Commentators and spokespersons ==
The contests are broadcast online worldwide through the official Junior Eurovision Song Contest website junioreurovision.tv and YouTube. In 2015, the online broadcasts featured commentary in English by junioreurovision.tv editor Luke Fisher and 2011 Bulgarian Junior Eurovision Song Contest entrant Ivan Ivanov. The Portuguese broadcaster, RTP, sent their own commentators to the contest in order to provide commentary in the Portuguese language. Spokespersons were also chosen by the national broadcaster in order to announce the awarding points from Portugal. The table below list the details of each commentator and spokesperson since 2005.

Year(s)	Channel	Commentator	Spokesperson	Ref.
2005	RTP1	Eládio Clímaco	Did not participate	
2006	Unknown	Isabel Angelino	Joana Galo Costa	
2007	Unknown	Isabel Angelino	Clara Pedro	
2008–2016	No broadcast		Did not participate	N/A
2017	Unknown	Hélder Reis and Nuno Galopim	Duarte Valença	
2018	Unknown	Nuno Galopim	Nadezhda Sidorova	
2019	RTP1, RTPi	Nuno Galopim	Zofia	
2020	No broadcast		Did not participate	N/A
2021	RTP1, RTPi, RTPi Asia, RTPi America	Nuno Galopim	Manon	
2022	RTP1, RTPi	Nuno Galopim and Iolanda Ferreira	Emily Alves	
2023	RTP1, RTPi, RTP África	Nuno Galopim and Iolanda Ferreira	Chloé Baldakar	
2024	RTP1, RTP África, RTP Internacional	Carina Jorge and Nuno Galopim	Júlia Machado	
2025	RTP1, RTP África, RTP Internacional	Carina Jorge and Nuno Galopim	Victoria Nicole	
2026	RTP2	Carina Jorge and José Carlos Malato	Inês Gonçalves	

== See also ==
- Portugal in the Eurovision Song Contest – Senior version of the Junior Eurovision Song Contest.
