= Caja Mágica =

Sports venue in Madrid, Spain

La Caja Mágica
- The Magic Box
- Manzanares Park Tennis Center
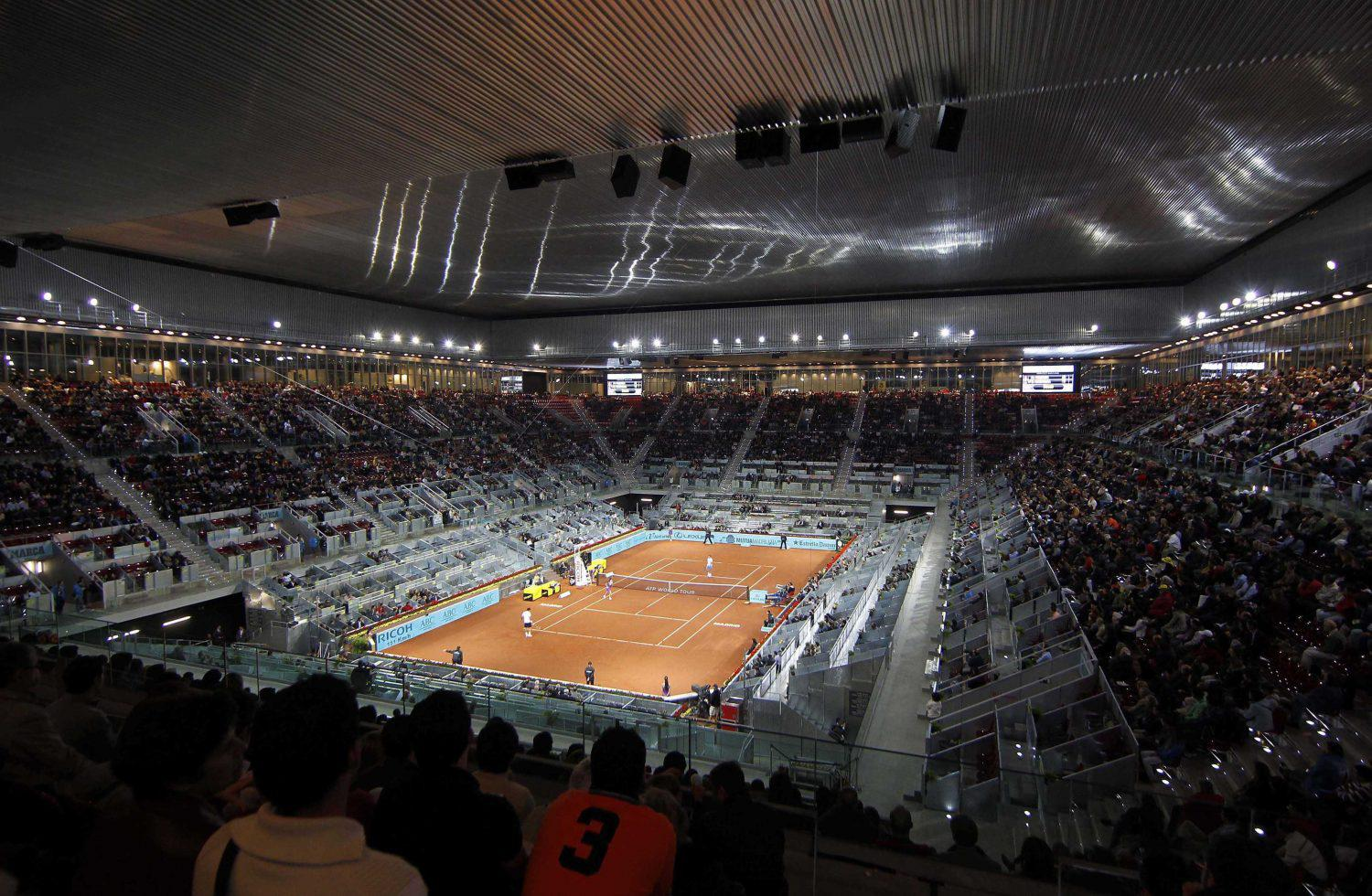
- Main court during 2018 Mutua Madrid Open
- Interactive map of La Caja Mágica
- Former names: Centro Olímpico de Tenis (planning/construction)
- Address: Camino de Perales, 23; 28041 Madrid; Spain
- Location: Parque Lineal del Manzanares, San Fermín
- Coordinates: 40.368896°N 3.684154°W
- Owner: Madrid Espacios y Congresos
- Capacity: 12,442 (Estadio Manolo Santana); 2,923 (Estadio Arantxa Sánchez Vicario); 1,772 (Estadio 3)

Construction
- Groundbreaking: 17 April 2006
- Opened: 8 May 2009
- Cost: €294 million
- Architect: Perrault Architecture
- Project manager: LKS Group
- Structural engineer: Typsa Group
- General contractor: FCC Construcción

Tenants
- Mutua Madrid Open (2009—present); Real Madrid Baloncesto (Liga ACB) (2010–2011)

Website
- Venue Website

Caja Mágica (pronounced [ˈkaxa ˈmaxika]; Spanish for 'Magic Box'), also known as the Manzanares Park Tennis Center, is a multi-purpose stadium located in Madrid, Spain. Since 2009, it has been the home of the Madrid Open tennis tournament.

There are three courts under the one structure, and a series of retractable roofs. The seating capacity of Courts 1 and 2 would have been increased if Madrid's bid for the 2020 Summer Olympics had been successful.

== Construction ==
The main building of the complex is the Edificio Madrid Caja Mágica, a sports venue that houses three arenas. The center clay court, with a maximum capacity for 12,442 spectators, is officially named Estadio Manolo Santana. The second largest court is called Estadio Arantxa Sánchez Vicario and has 3,194 seats alongside a third smaller court for 2,730 spectators. All courts have an individual adjustable roof that can be moved into several different positions, opened or completely closed if necessary. The sports complex was designed by French architect Dominique Perrault. The main materials used in the cubic-shaped building are steel, aluminum, concrete and glass. Initially budgeted for 120 million euros, the total construction bill amounted to 294 million euros.

Also part of the complex is an elongated building with eleven tennis courts and an outdoor facility with sixteen courts.

== Other sports and events ==
It was opened with a concert by singer Lenny Kravitz on 8 May, 2009.

In the 2010–11 season, it was the home stadium for the Real Madrid basketball team. In January 2013, it was the Madrid venue for the 2013 World Men's Handball Championship.

It can also be used for concerts and shows. It was the venue for the 2010 MTV Europe Music Awards held on 7 November of that year.

On 10 May 2024, Caja Mágica was announced as the selected venue for the Junior Eurovision Song Contest 2024.

On 12 November 2024, it was announced that the first Major tournament of the 2025 Call of Duty League season hosted by Toronto Ultra would be played at Caja Mágica from 30 January to 2 February.

== Gallery ==
Caja Mágica
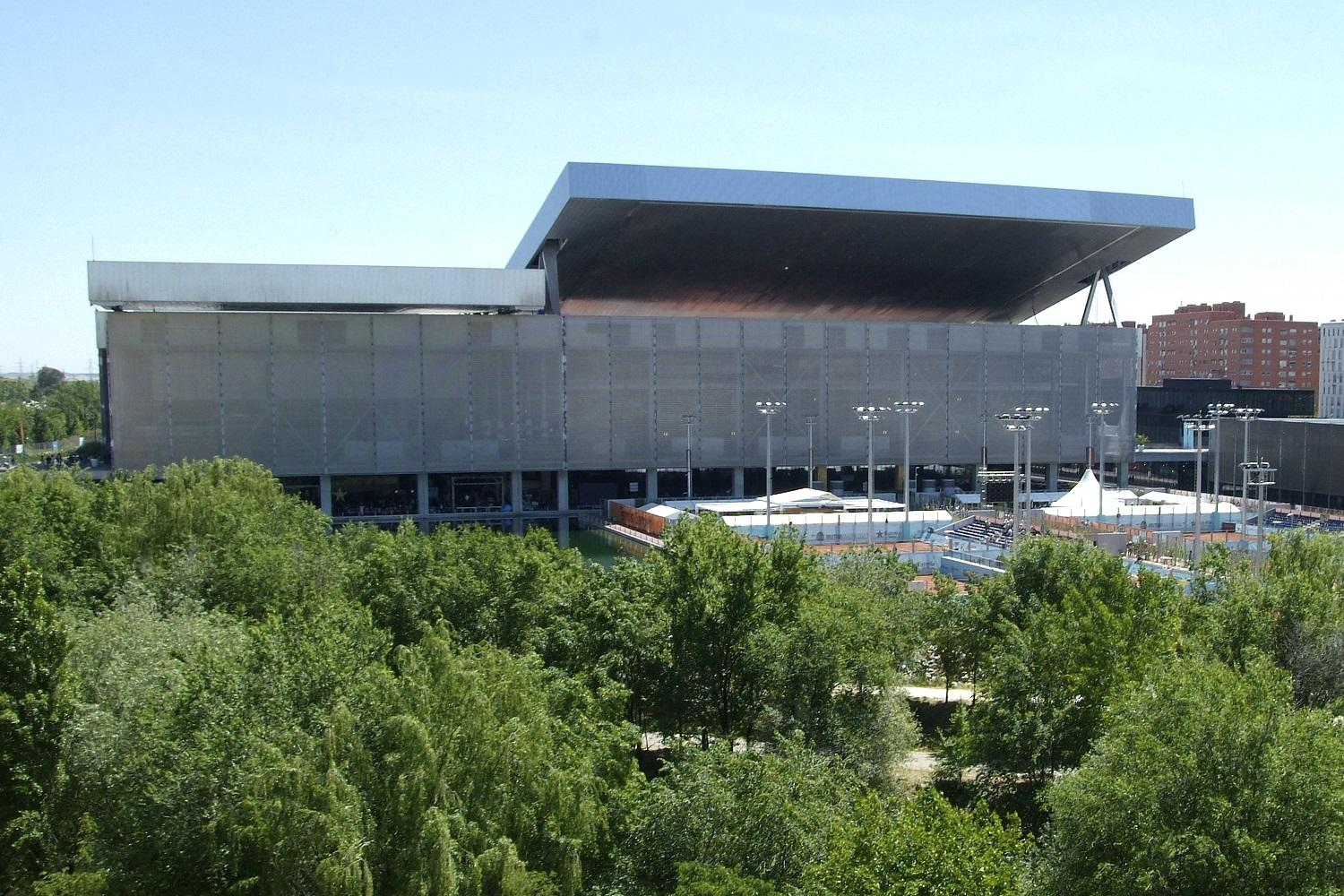
Exterior view of the venue (c.2018)

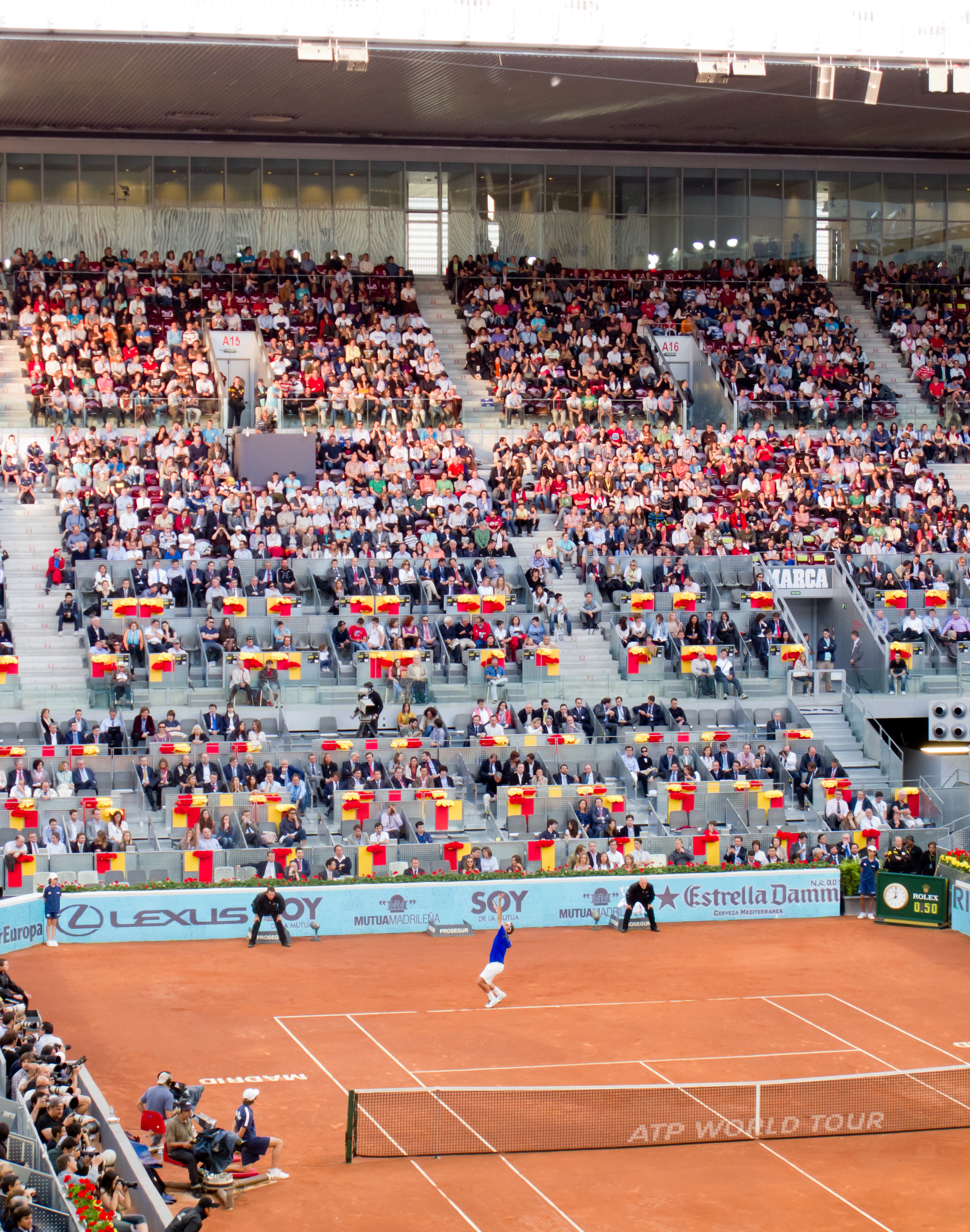
Main court during the Madrid Open (c.2011)

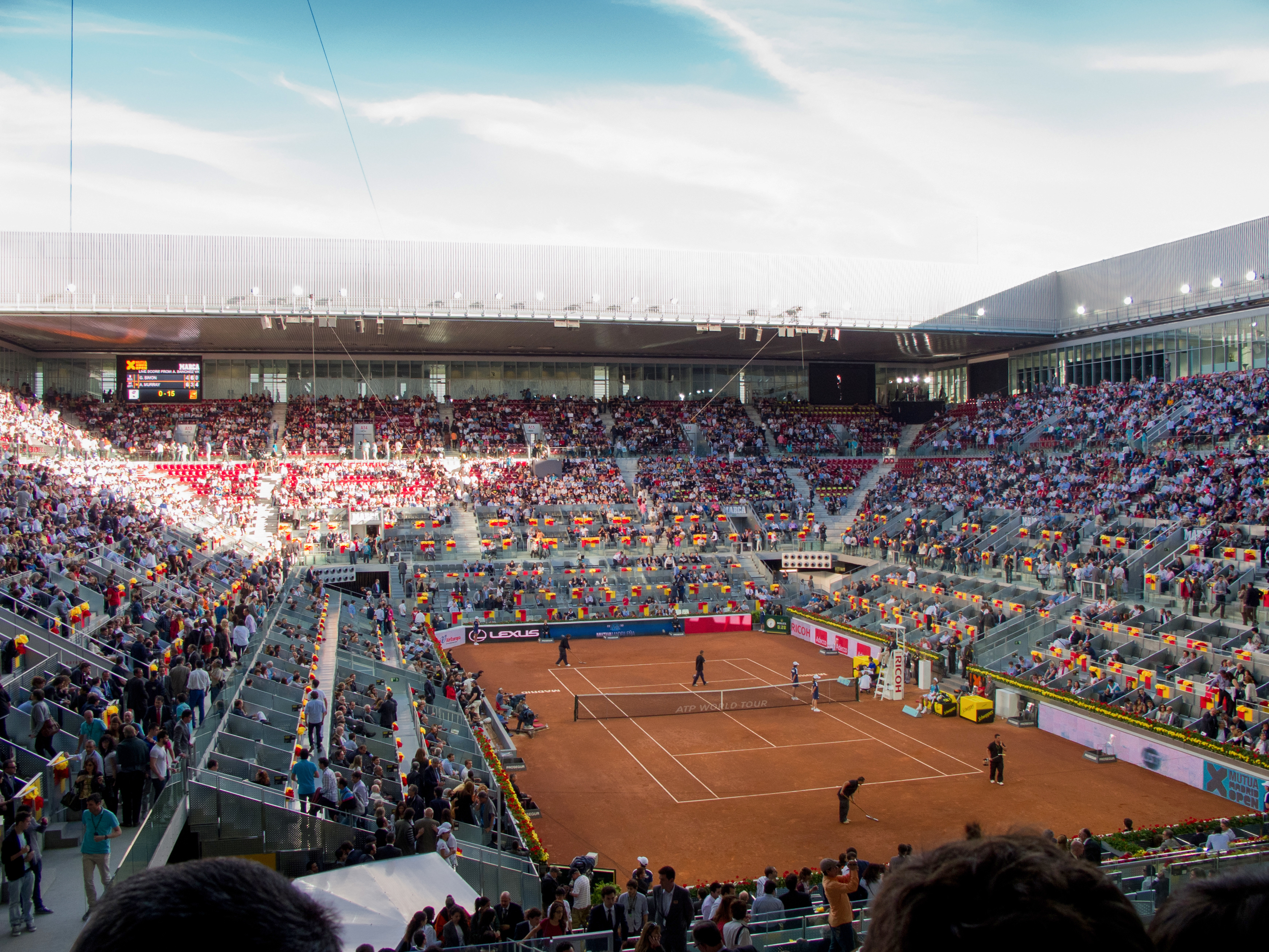
View of the main court during a match between Roger Federer and Feliciano López (c.2011)

== See also ==
- List of tennis stadiums by capacity
- List of indoor arenas in Spain

Preceded by Madrid Arena	Mutua Madrileña Madrid Open; Venue; 2009 – present	Succeeded by Current
Preceded by Palacio Vistalegre	Home of Real Madrid Baloncesto; 2010 – 2011	Succeeded by Palacio de Deportes de la CAM
Preceded by Stade Pierre-Mauroy; Lille	Davis Cup; Finals venue 2019	Succeeded by Madrid Arena
Preceded by Palais Nikaïa; Nice	Junior Eurovision Song Contest; Venue; 2024	Succeeded by Gymnastic Hall of Olympic City; Tbilisi
