= 2016 Tour of Flanders =

Cycling race

2016 UCI World Tour, race 8 of 28

Race details
- Dates: 3 April 2016
- Stages: 1
- Distance: 255 km (158 mi)
- Winning time: 6h 10' 37"

Results
	Winner	Peter Sagan (SVK)	(Tinkoff)
	Second	Fabian Cancellara (SUI)	(Trek–Segafredo)
	Third	Sep Vanmarcke (BEL)	(LottoNL–Jumbo)

The 2016 Tour of Flanders was a one-day classic cycling race that took place in Belgium on Sunday 3 April 2016. It was the 100th edition of the Tour of Flanders; it was the eighth event of the UCI World Tour and the third of the cobbled one-day classics. It was the second Monument race of the 2016 cycling season.

The race started in Bruges and finished in Oudenaarde. The total distance was 255 kilometres (158 mi), covering 18 categorized climbs and seven flat cobblestoned sectors. The principal favourites for the overall victory were Fabian Cancellara (Trek–Segafredo), Tom Boonen (Etixx–Quick-Step) and Peter Sagan (Tinkoff).

After several riders had abandoned the race due to crashes and injuries, the decisive break was formed with 30 kilometres (19 mi) to go by Sagan, Michał Kwiatkowski (Team Sky) and Sep Vanmarcke (LottoNL–Jumbo). On the last climb of the Oude Kwaremont, Kwiatkowski was dropped; on the Paterberg, which followed shortly afterwards and was final climb of the race, Sagan dropped Vanmarcke and set off alone towards the finish. Vanmarcke and Cancellara collaborated in an effort to chase him down, but Sagan was able to ride to the finish alone. Cancellara finished second with Vanmarcke third, both more than 20 seconds behind Sagan.

== Route ==
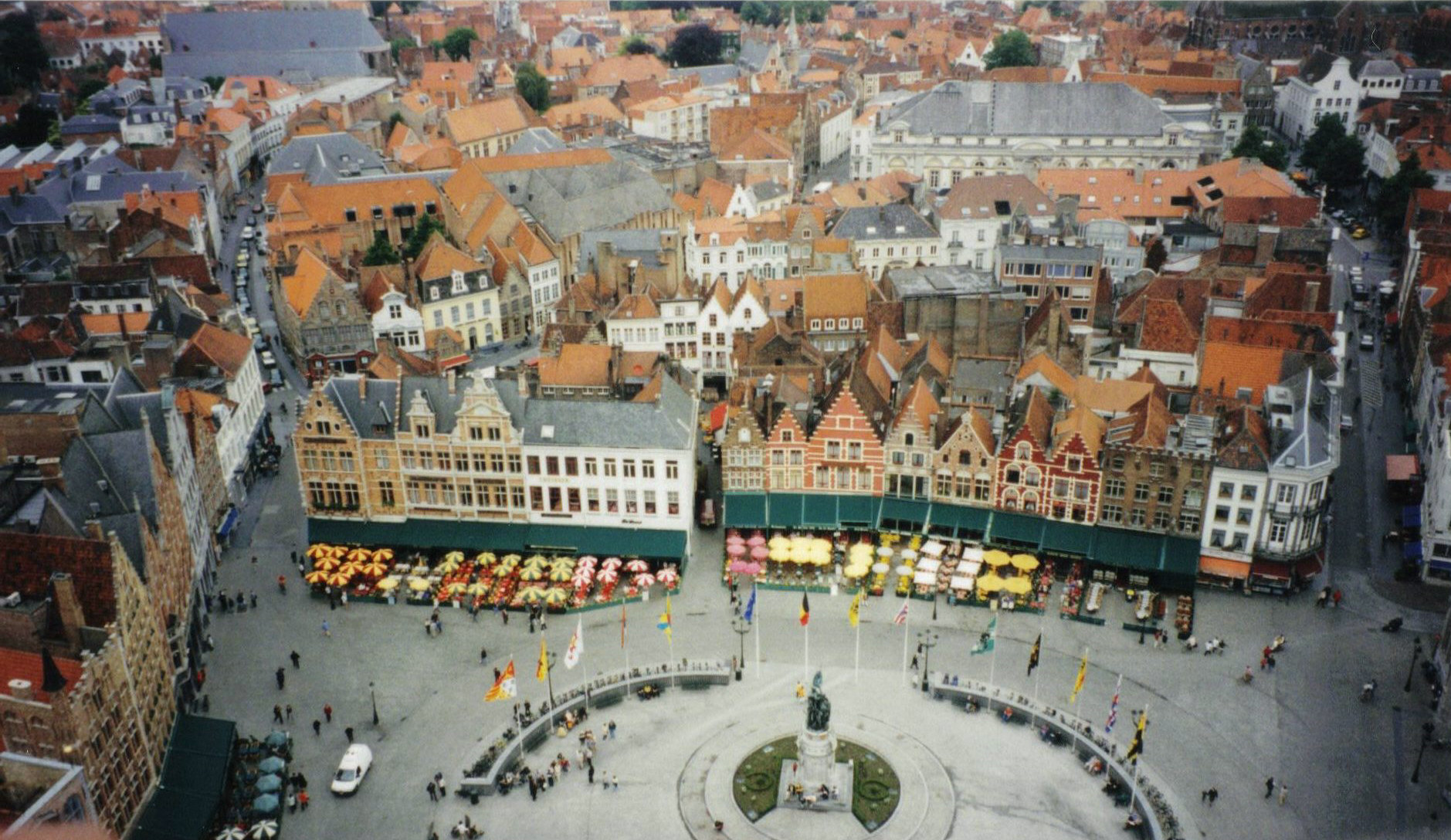
Market Square in Bruges, scene of the start of the 100th Tour of Flanders.

Route profile

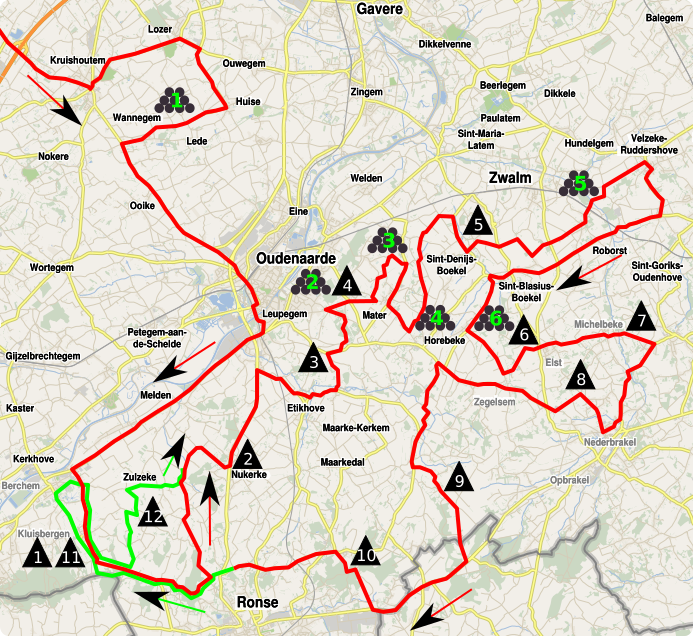
First lap of the circuit (red) and transition to the second lap (green).

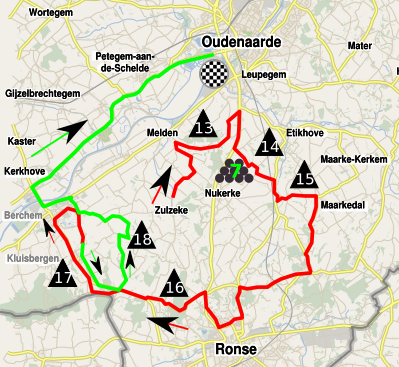
Second lap of the circuit (red) and final (green)

The route of the 100th edition was presented on 29 November 2015 at Brussels Airport. It contained small changes from previous editions: the Tiegemberg in West Flanders was omitted, while in the Flemish Ardennes the flat cobbled sector of the Holleweg was cut from the race and replaced with the Jagerij cobbled road. The change was needed to keep the iconic Molenberg climb in the route due to roadworks. The recent tradition of announcing a Dorp van de Ronde ("Village of the Tour") was also abandoned, although the route passed through Kanegem and Aarsele in tribute to Briek Schotte and Roger Decock (the oldest living winner of the Tour of Flanders) respectively.

The race started in the Market Square in Bruges with a neutralised zone, leaving the town to the south. The racing started outside the city and took the riders southwest through Torhout to Roeselare, then east through Ardooie and Tielt, then south-east to Oudenaarde, passing across the first cobbled sector of the day, the flat Huisepontweg. After Oudenaarde, the route continued into a series of circuits through the hilly area to the south and east. After 103 kilometres (64 mi) came the first climb, the Oude Kwaremont, a 2,200-metre (2,400 yd), partially cobbled climb that would feature twice more later in the race. The route turned north and, following the climb of the non-cobbled Kortekeer, the riders entered a 20-kilometre (12 mi) section with several cobbled roads. These included the cobbled climbs of the Eikenberg and the Wolvenberg, then the flat Ruiterstraat, Kerkgate and Jagerij, the climb of the Molenberg, then finally the 2,300 metres (2,500 yd) of the flat Paddestraat. The route then turned back to the south-west, across the flat Haaghoek cobbles and then the non-cobbled climbs of the Leberg, Berendries, Valkenberg, Kaperij and Kanarieberg. This brought the route back to take on the second ascent of the Oude Kwaremont, followed immediately by the steep cobbled climb of the Paterberg, 360 metres (390 yd) long with an average gradient of 12.9% and sections at over 20%. At the summit of the Paterberg, there were 51 kilometres (32 mi) left to the finish.

There were six more climbs in the next 40-kilometre (25 mi) loop. The first of these was the Koppenberg, which includes the steepest roads of the race, with gradients of 22%. This was followed by the flat cobbles of the Mariaborrestraat and the climbs of the Steenbeekdries and the Taaienberg. The roads took the riders south into Ronse for the climb of the Kruisberg, then north-west to the foot of the Oude Kwaremont. The Oude Kwaremont–Paterberg combination was used for a second time; at the top of the Paterberg there were 11.7 kilometres (7.3 mi) to the finish. These took place over mainly flat roads, with a long finishing straight on the outskirts of Oudenaarde.

=== Climbs and cobbled roads ===
In total, the race included eighteen categorized climbs.

Categorized climbs in the 2016 Tour of Flanders
Number	Name	Distance from finish (km)	Road surface	Length (m)	Average gradient (%)	Maximum gradient (%)
1	Oude Kwaremont	152	cobbles	2200	4.2%	11%
2	Kortekeer	141	asphalt	1000	6.4%	17.1%
3	Eikenberg	134	cobbles	1300	6.2%	11%
4	Wolvenberg	130	asphalt	666	6.8%	17.3%
5	Molenberg	118	cobbles	463	7%	14.2%
6	Leberg	97	asphalt	700	6.1%	14%
7	Berendries	93	asphalt	940	7.1%	12.4%
8	Valkenberg	88	asphalt	875	6%	15%
9	Kaperij	77	asphalt	1250	5%	8%
10	Kanarieberg	70	asphalt	1000	7.7%	14%
11	Oude Kwaremont	54	cobbles	2200	4.2%	11%
12	Paterberg	51	cobbles	400	12.5%	20%
13	Koppenberg	44	cobbles	600	11.6%	22%
14	Steenbeekdries	39	cobbles	820	7.6%	12.8%
15	Taaienberg	36	cobbles	800	7.1%	18%
16	Kruisberg–Hotond	26	cobbles–asphalt	2500	5%	9%
17	Oude Kwaremont	16	cobbles	2200	4.2%	12%
18	Paterberg	13	cobbles	400	12.5%	20%

Additionally, there were seven sectors of flat cobbled roads:

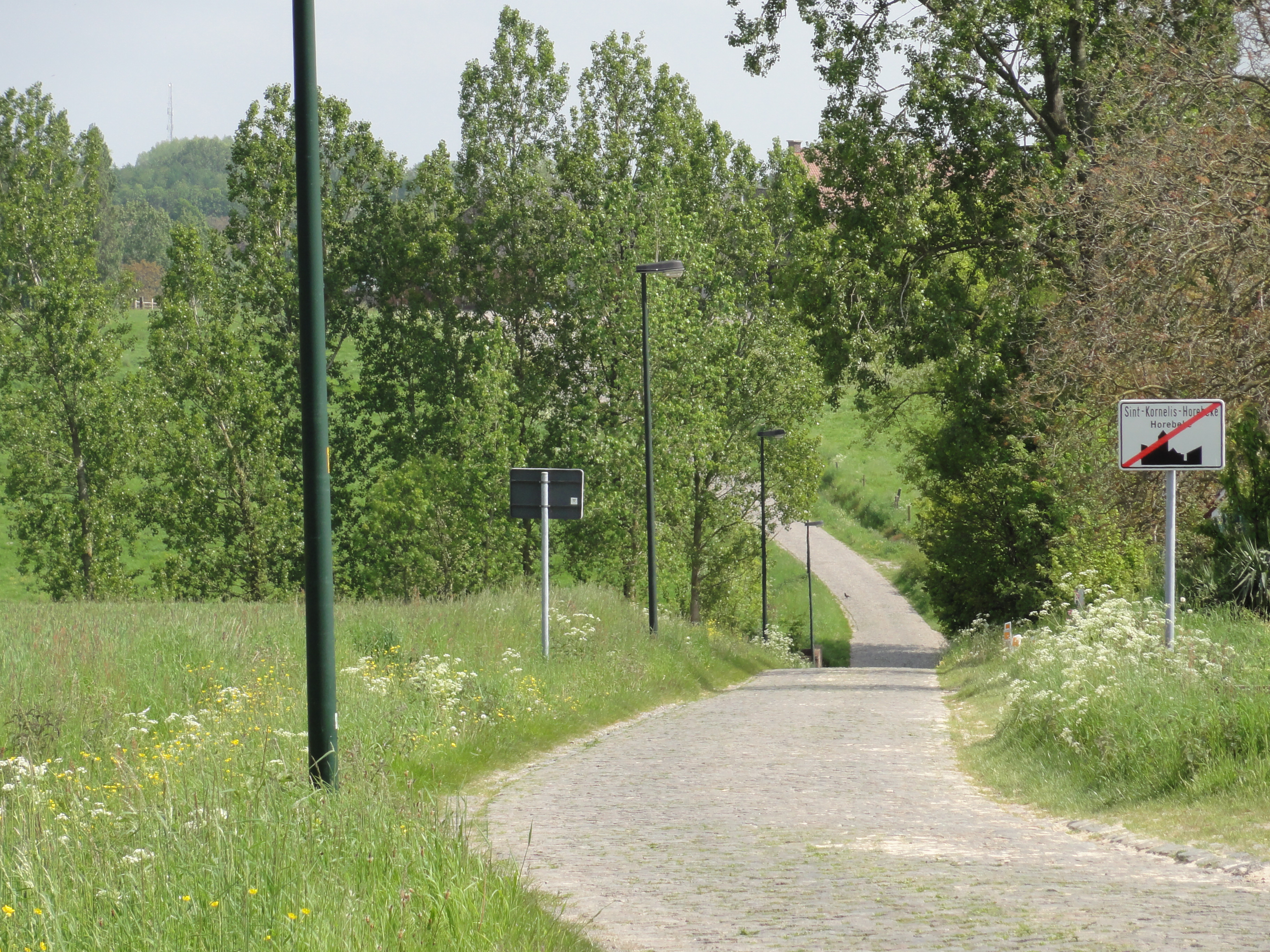
The Haaghoek in Sint-Kornelis-Horebeke is the penultimate flat cobbled sector of the race, at 101 km from the finish.

Flat cobbled roads in the 2016 Tour of Flanders
Number	Cobbled Sector	Distance from finish (km)	Length (m)
1	Huisepontweg	173	1600
2	Ruitersstraat	130	800
3	Mater-Kerkgate	127	2650
4	Jagerij	124	800
5	Paddestraat	113	2300
6	Haaghoek	101	2000
7	Mariaborrestraat	40	2000

== Participating teams ==
The 18 UCI WorldTeams were automatically invited and were obliged to participate in the race. An additional seven UCI Professional Continental teams were given wildcard entries: two Belgian teams (Wanty–Groupe Gobert and Topsport Vlaanderen–Baloise), a Dutch team (Roompot–Oranje Peloton), a German team (Bora–Argon 18), a French team (Direct Énergie), an Italian team (Southeast–Venezuela) and a Polish team (CCC–Sprandi–Polkowice). With eight on each team, the peloton at the start of the race included 200 riders. Of these, 118 reached the finish line.

UCI WorldTeams

- AG2R La Mondiale
- Astana
- BMC Racing Team
- Team Dimension Data
- Etixx–Quick-Step
- FDJ
- IAM Cycling
- Lampre–Merida
- Lotto–Soudal
- Movistar Team
- Team Giant–Alpecin
- Team Katusha
- LottoNL–Jumbo
- Team Sky
- Tinkoff
- Trek–Segafredo
- Cannondale
- Orica–GreenEDGE

UCI Professional Continental teams

- Bora–Argon 18
- CCC–Sprandi–Polkowice
- Direct Énergie
- Roompot–Oranje Peloton
- Topsport Vlaanderen–Baloise
- Wanty–Groupe Gobert
- Southeast–Venezuela

== Pre-race favourites ==
The principal favourites for the race were Tom Boonen (Etixx–Quick-Step) and Fabian Cancellara (Etixx–Quick-Step), both of whom had won the race on three previous occasions. Cancellara was in strong form, having won the Strade Bianche and having come fourth in E3 Harelbeke and Gent–Wevelgem the previous week. Boonen, however, was not in strong form: he had not won a major classic since 2012 and had not performed strongly in the previous week's races. Nevertheless, Cycling Weekly wrote "you can never write the three-time Flanders winner off in a race like this." The other former winners present at the start were Alexander Kristoff (Team Katusha), the defending champion, and Cancellara's teammate Stijn Devolder. Kristoff's strong sprint gave him an advantage if he was in a group that finished together; he had, however, been ill in the previous week. Devolder, meanwhile, was expected to work for Cancellara.

The other major favourite for the race was Peter Sagan (Tinkoff), the reigning world road race champion. Sagan had come second in E3 Harelbeke and first in Gent–Wevelgem. He had the advantage of being able to follow attacks and also to wait to use his strong sprint if he came to the finish with other riders.

Other riders with a chance of victory included Michał Kwiatkowski (Team Sky), who had won E3 Harelbeke ahead of Sagan and who had a strong team with Geraint Thomas, Ian Stannard and Luke Rowe; Greg Van Avermaet (BMC Racing Team); Boonen's teammates Niki Terpstra and Zdeněk Štybar; Sep Vanmarcke (LottoNL–Jumbo); and Tiesj Benoot (Lotto–Soudal).

== Race summary ==
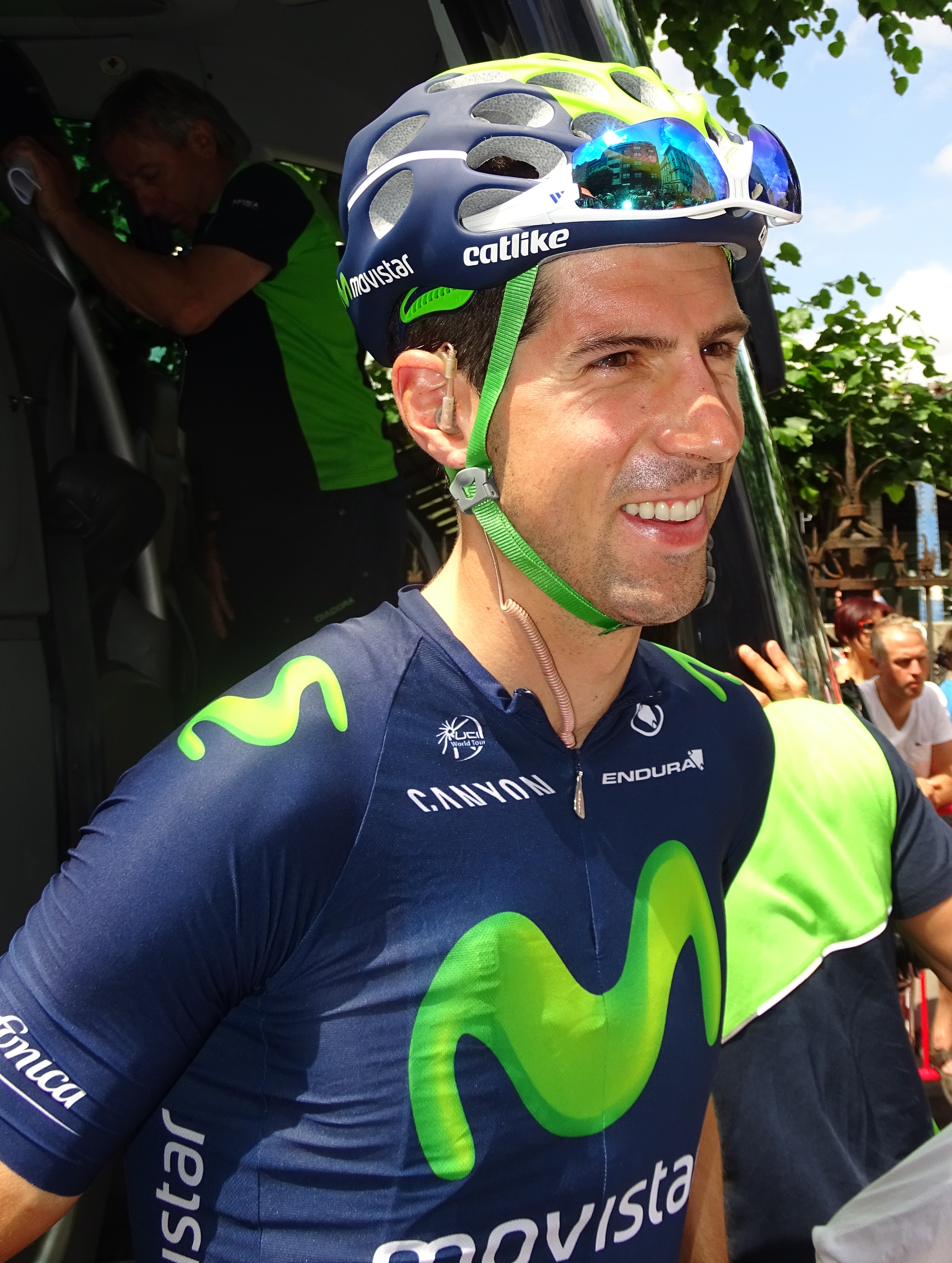
Imanol Erviti, who rode for 180 kilometres (110 mi) in the breakaway and finished seventh (pictured at the 2015 Tour de France)

Before the race began, there was a minute's silence in memory of Antoine Demoitié, a Wanty–Groupe Gobert rider who had been killed in a crash with a motorbike during Gent–Wevelgem. After 25 kilometres (16 mi), the riders arrived in Hooglede, the birthplace of Daan Myngheer, a rider for Roubaix–Métropole Européenne de Lille who had died following a heart attack in the Critérium International; the peloton rode slowly through the town in memory of him.

The day's breakaway took a long time to form: over an hour into the day's racing, with more than 70 kilometres (43 mi) covered, a six-man move broke free. The riders were Hugo Houle (AG2R La Mondiale), Federico Zurlo (Lampre–Merida), Imanol Erviti (Movistar), Lukas Pöstlberger (Bora–Argon 18), Gijs Van Hoecke (Topsport Vlaanderen–Baloise) and Wesley Kreder (Roompot–Oranje Peloton). They earned a lead of over four minutes, but broke apart as the day's climbs began.

During the middle part of the race several riders were forced to withdraw after crashes. Arnaud Démare (FDJ), the winner of Milan–San Remo, crashed after 100 kilometres (62 mi), while Marcus Burghardt (BMC) and Tiesj Benoot crashed on the Wolvenberg shortly afterwards. Less than 30 kilometres (19 mi) later, several BMC riders crashed together and four were forced to withdraw. These included Greg Van Avermaet, who broke his collarbone.

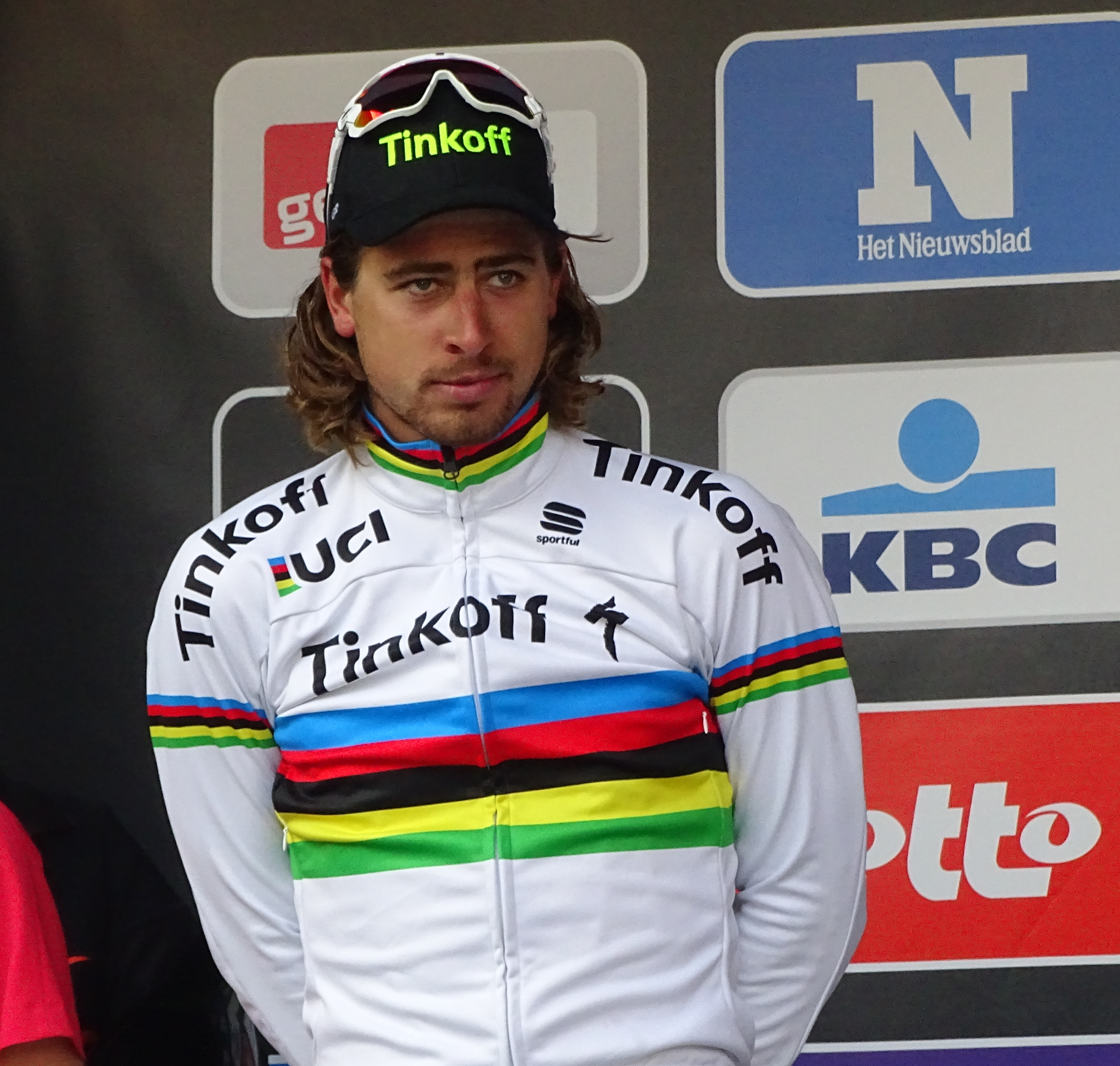
Peter Sagan, wearing the rainbow-striped jersey of the reigning world champion (pictured at the 2016 Omloop Het Nieuwsblad)

On the Molenberg, with more than 110 kilometres (68 mi) remaining, a hard effort by Tony Martin (Etixx–Quick-Step) caused a split in the main peloton, with 25 riders in the front group, but the groups came back together shortly afterwards. André Greipel (Lotto–Soudal) and Nils Politt (Katusha) then attacked on the Leberg and were allowed to go; they were followed by Dmitriy Gruzdev (Astana) and Dimitri Claeys (Wanty–Groupe Gobert). These four riders joined up with Houle, Erviti and Van Hoecke from the original break; Houle was dropped soon afterwards to form a six-man leading group, which had a two-minute lead at the foot of the second ascent of the Oude Kwaremont. On the climb, Stijn Vandenbergh (Etixx–Quick-Step) and Dylan van Baarle (Cannondale) attacked from the peloton. Another group, including Sep Vanmarcke and Ian Stannard, attacked before the Koppenberg. Stannard then went solo over the top of the climb. Meanwhile, Vandenbergh and Van Baarle caught up with the group of leaders.

There were several more attacks before the climb of the Taaienberg, where a small group of favourites formed and quickly caught Stannard. Shortly afterwards, with 30 kilometres (19 mi) remaining, Michał Kwiatkowski and Peter Sagan attacked together and were joined by Sep Vanmarcke. They crossed the Kruisberg together and caught the remainder of the breakaway with 23.5 kilometres (14.6 mi) remaining, 40 seconds ahead of the peloton. On the final climb of the Oude Kwaremont, Kwiatkowski was unable to follow Sagan and Vanmarcke, while Cancellara rode clear of the peloton. Sagan was first to the summit with Vanmarcke; Cancellara was twelve seconds behind. Cancellara was then caught by Niki Terpstra, Erviti and Claeys.

On the final climb, the Paterberg, Sagan rode away from Vanmarcke, who was caught by Cancellara at the top of the climb. They rode in pursuit of Sagan, who had a 15-second lead at the summit. The chasing pair were unable to bring Sagan back and he rode to the finish to win his first Monument. Cancellara finished second, 25 seconds back, with Vanmarcke allowing him to take second place. Kristoff won the sprint for fourth place, ahead of Luke Rowe (Sky), 49 seconds behind Sagan.

== Result ==
Top 10 (of 100 finishers)
Rank	Rider	Team	Time
1	Peter Sagan (SVK)	Tinkoff	6hr 10' 37"
2	Fabian Cancellara (SUI)	Trek–Segafredo	+ 25"
3	Sep Vanmarcke (BEL)	LottoNL–Jumbo	+ 28"
4	Alexander Kristoff (NOR)	Team Katusha	+ 49"
5	Luke Rowe (GBR)	Team Sky	+ 49"
6	Dylan van Baarle (NED)	Cannondale	+ 49"
7	Imanol Erviti (ESP)	Movistar Team	+ 49"
8	Zdeněk Štybar (CZE)	Etixx–Quick-Step	+ 49"
9	Dimitri Claeys (BEL)	Wanty–Groupe Gobert	+ 49"
10	Niki Terpstra (NED)	Etixx–Quick-Step	+ 49"

== Post-race analysis ==
=== Rider reactions ===
Sagan celebrated his victory by doing a wheelie after the finishing line. He said afterwards that it was the hardest Tour of Flanders he had ever raced, having been "full gas" throughout and suggested that Cancellara had made a mistake by not following the attack he had made with Kwiatkowski and Vanmarcke. Cancellara was emotional after finishing his final Tour of Flanders. He said that he had "missed this one second", referring to the attack by Sagan. He said that he and Vanmarcke had done all they could in the chase, but that Sagan was too strong. Vanmarcke, meanwhile, said that he had struggled due to crashes in the middle part of the race and then had suffered cramp when Sagan attacked on the Paterberg. He described the move by Sagan and Kwiatkowski as the "decisive moment in the race".

Boonen, who finished fifteenth, described Sagan as "really strong" and as the "deserved winner"; he said "The way [Sagan] rode up the Paterberg was a good showcase on how to ride a bike". Boonen, meanwhile, turned his attention to Paris–Roubaix the following week. Van Avermaet described himself as "really disappointed" following his crash, which ruled him out of Paris–Roubaix. Luke Rowe's fifth place was Team Sky's best ever performance in the Tour of Flanders; he praised Kwiatkowski's move, but said "there's not much you can do when someone has better legs"; he described Sagan, Cancellara and Vanmarcke as "the three strongest guys in the race". Imanol Erviti, who had been in the breakaway for 180 kilometres (110 mi), finished seventh. Cycling Weekly described this as "phenomenal"; it was Movistar's best ever result.

=== World Tour standings ===
Sagan remained at the top of the 2016 UCI World Tour standings following his victory; his total of 329 points was more than 100 ahead of the next rider, his teammate Alberto Contador. Cancellara moved up from thirteenth to fourth and Vanmarcke from sixteenth to sixth. Sagan's total put Slovakia in third place in the nations' rankings, ahead of Great Britain and Spain, even though he was the only Slovak to have scored World Tour points.

UCI World Tour standings on 3 April 2016
Rank	Rider	Team	Points
1	Peter Sagan (SVK)	Tinkoff	329
2	Richie Porte (AUS)	BMC Racing Team	222
3	Alberto Contador (ESP)	Tinkoff	171
4	Fabian Cancellara (SUI)	Trek–Segafredo	166
5	Greg Van Avermaet (BEL)	BMC Racing Team	162
6	Sep Vanmarcke (BEL)	LottoNL–Jumbo	141
7	Arnaud Démare (FRA)	FDJ	137
8	Sergio Henao (COL)	Team Sky	115
9	Simon Gerrans (AUS)	Orica–GreenEDGE	113
10	Alexander Kristoff (NOR)	Team Katusha	106

== See also ==
- 2016 in men's road cycling
