= 2017 Tour of Flanders =

Cycling race

2017 UCI World Tour, race 13 of 37

Race details
- Dates: 2 April 2017
- Stages: 1
- Distance: 260.8 km (162.1 mi)
- Winning time: 6h 23' 45"

Results
	Winner	Philippe Gilbert (BEL)	(Quick-Step Floors)
	Second	Greg Van Avermaet (BEL)	(BMC Racing Team)
	Third	Niki Terpstra (NED)	(Quick-Step Floors)

The 2017 Tour of Flanders (Dutch: Ronde van Vlaanderen 2017) was the 101st edition of the Tour of Flanders, a one-day cycling classic, that took place on 2 April 2017. It was the second monument race of the 2017 cycling season and the thirteenth event of the 2017 UCI World Tour. The race marked the pinnacle of the Flemish Cycling Week.

The race was won by Belgian national champion Philippe Gilbert from the Quick-Step Floors team, after a solo attack on the Oude Kwaremont and holding off the rest of the field over the remaining 55 kilometres (34 mi). Second place went to another Belgian, Greg Van Avermaet of the BMC Racing Team, beating Dutch riders Niki Terpstra (Quick-Step Floors) and Dylan van Baarle from Cannondale–Drapac in a three-up sprint finish for the podium placings.

== Route ==
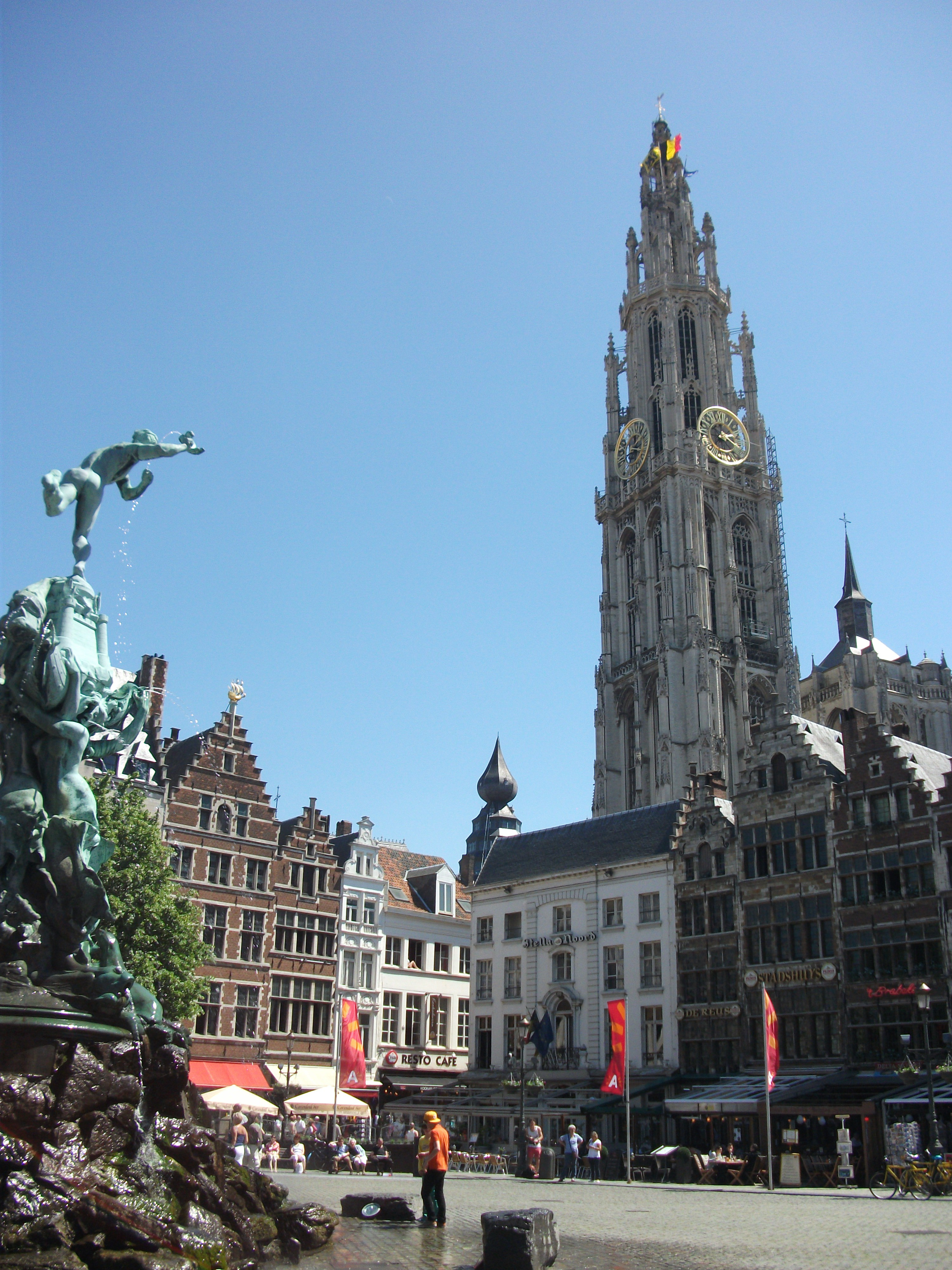
Antwerp hosted the start of the race on its central Market Square for the first time.

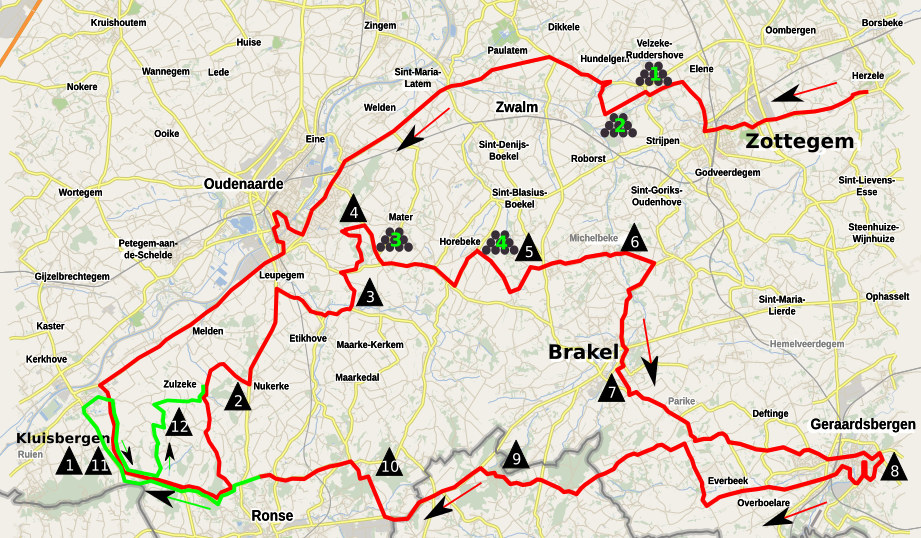
The first lap of the circuit (in red) and transition to the second lap (in green).

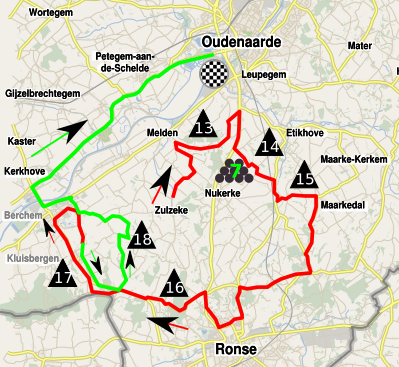
The second lap of the circuit (in red) and the final 16.1-kilometre (10.0 mi) element of the race (in green).

The city of Antwerp staged the start of the event for the first time, after 19 starts in Bruges, marking the first time the Tour of Flanders addressed the province of Antwerp. The race finished in Oudenaarde for a total distance of 260.8 kilometres (162.1 mi) and saw the renewed inclusion of the Muur van Geraardsbergen, one of the emblematic climbs of the race.

The first 116 kilometres (72 mi) of the race are on all-flat roads from Antwerp via Sint-Niklaas, Dendermonde, Aalst and Zottegem towards Oudenaarde, where the race passes for the first time after 101 kilometres (63 mi); before addressing the first of 18 climbs, the Oude Kwaremont after 116 kilometres (72 mi). The Oude Kwaremont, which has been the focal point of the Ronde in the last few years, appears three times on the route and its last two appearances are paired with the Paterberg three kilometres later. The Muur van Geraardsbergen is the ninth categorised climb at 95 kilometres (59 mi) from the finish.

The final 75 kilometres (47 mi) were identical to previous editions. Of the final nine climbs, first was the Kanarieberg, then the first combination of Oude Kwaremont–Paterberg, followed just 6 kilometres (3.7 mi) later by the roughly-cobbled Koppenberg, the steepest climb of the race. The Koppenberg was immediately followed by the flat cobbled sector of the Mariaborrestraat, leading to the Steenbeekdries and Taaienberg climbs. The Kruisberg in Ronse came at 26 kilometres (16 mi) from the finish, before heading to the final two climbs. The second pairing of Oude Kwaremont and Paterberg represented the end game of the race, preceding the 13.2-kilometre (8.2 mi) run-in to the finish.

=== Categorised climbs and cobbles ===
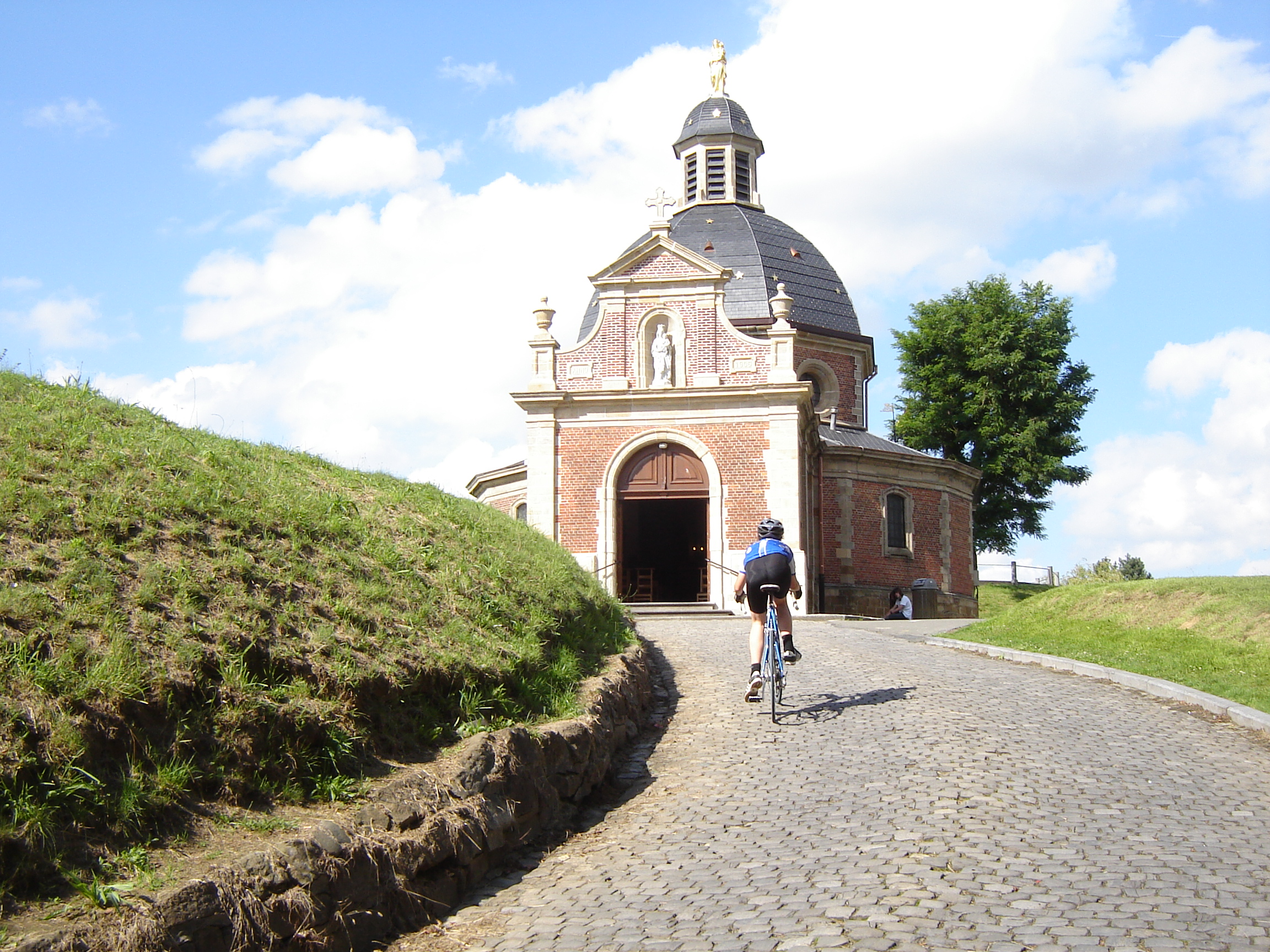
The Muur van Geraardsbergen, with gradients touching 20%, is re-included in the course after a five-year absence.

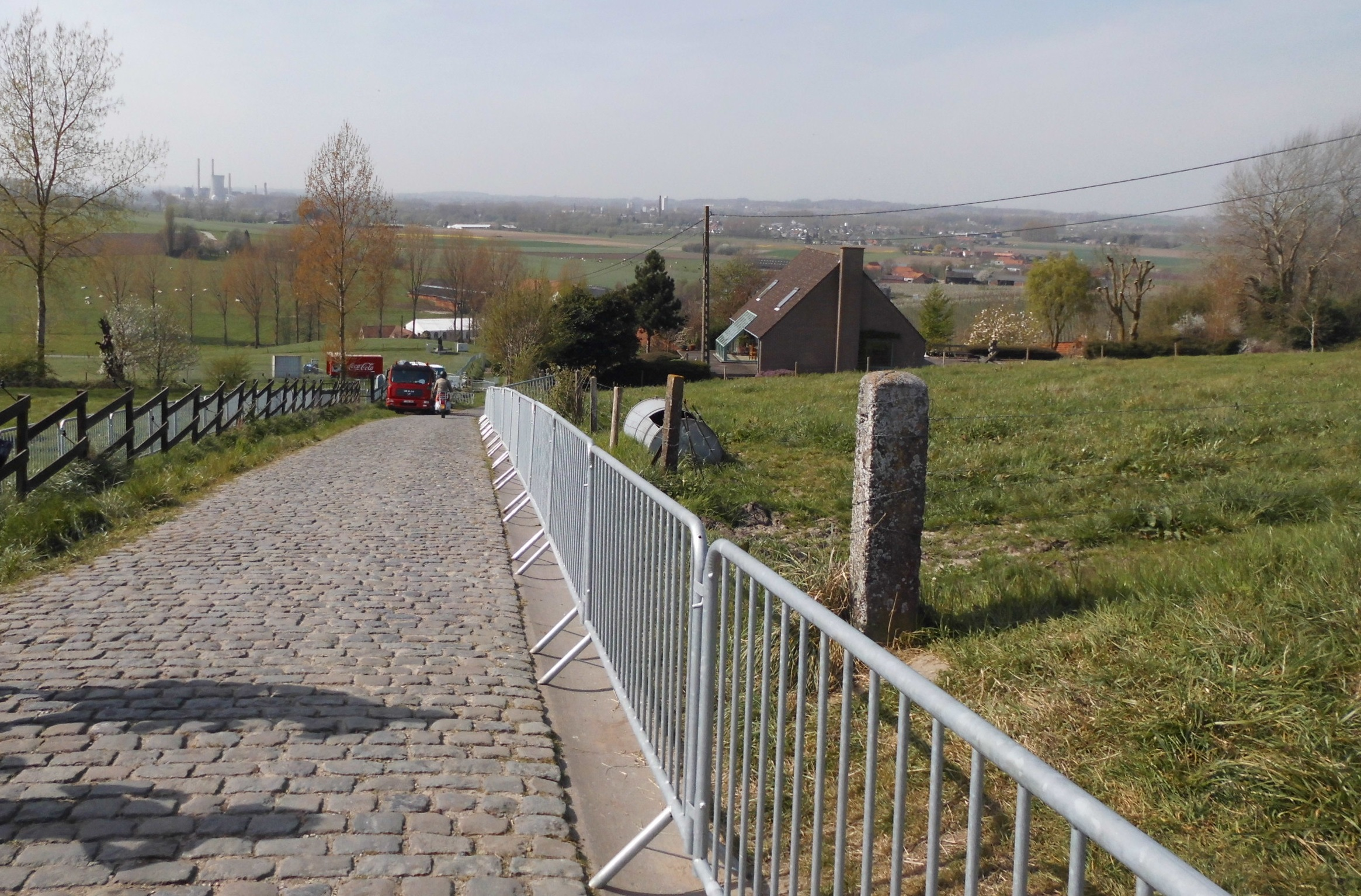
The Paterberg in Kluisbergen is the last climb of the race with just a 13.2-kilometre (8.2 mi) run-in remaining to Oudenaarde.

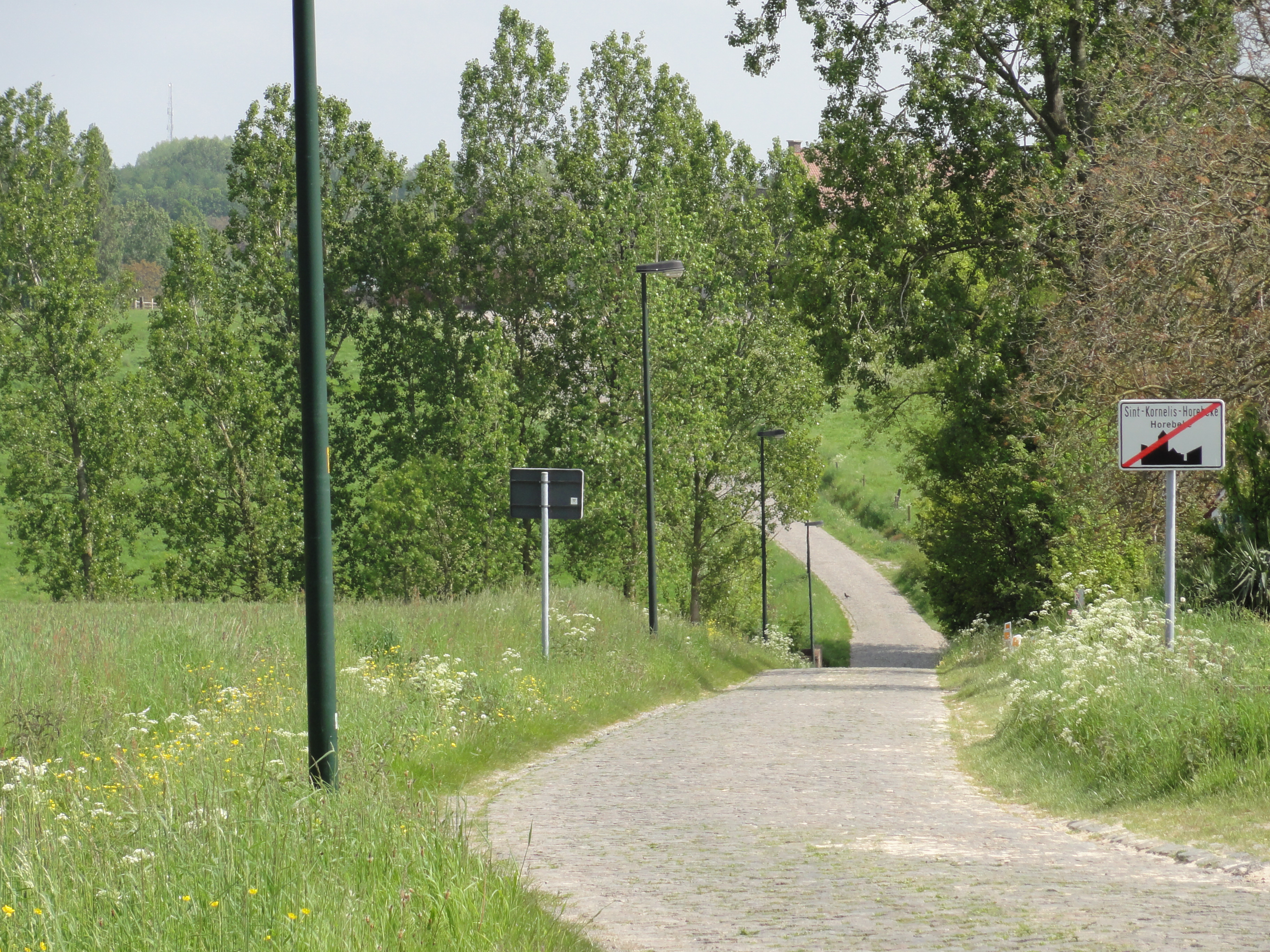
The Haaghoek road is the penultimate flat cobbled sector of the race, 117.4 kilometres (72.9 miles) from the finish.

Eighteen categorised climbs are programmed, of which 12 are cobbled. In addition to the climbs, five sectors of flat cobbled roads are included.

Climbs and cobbled sections in the 2017 Tour of Flanders
No.	Name	Distance from		Surface	Length (metres)	Gradient (%)	
No.	Name	Start (km)	Finish (km)	Surface	Length (metres)	(ave.)	(max.)
–	Lippenhovestraat	85.2	175.6	cobbles	1300	—	
–	Paddestraat	86.6	174.2	cobbles	1500	—	
1	Oude Kwaremont	116.3	144.5	cobbles	2200	4%	11.6%
2	Kortekeer	126.8	134.0	asphalt	1000	6.4%	17.1%
3	Eikenberg	134.5	126.3	cobbles	1200	5.2%	10%
4	Wolvenberg	137.6	123.2	asphalt	645	7.9%	17.3%
–	Holleweg	137.7	123.1	cobbles	1500	—	
–	Haaghoek	143.4	117.4	cobbles	2000	—	
5	Leberg	146.4	114.4	asphalt	950	4.2%	13.8%
6	Berendries	150.5	110.3	asphalt	940	7%	12.3%
7	Tenbosse	155.5	105.3	asphalt	450	6.9%	8.7%
8	Muur van Geraardsbergen	165.8	95.0	cobbles	1075	9.3%	19.8%
9	La Houppe	184.5	76.3	cobbles	2800	3.3%	10%
10	Kanarieberg	190.3	70.5	asphalt	1000	7.7%	14%
11	Oude Kwaremont	206.2	54.6	cobbles	2200	4%	11.6%
12	Paterberg	209.6	51.2	cobbles	360	12.9%	20.3%
13	Koppenberg	216.2	44.6	cobbles	600	11.6%	22%
–	Mariaborrestraat	220.3	40.5	cobbles	2000	—	
14	Steenbeekdries	221.6	39.2	asphalt	700	5.3%	6.7%
15	Taaienberg	224.1	36.7	cobbles	530	6.6%	15.8%
16	Kruisberg	234.3	26.5	asphalt	2500	5%	9%
17	Oude Kwaremont	244.1	16.7	cobbles	2200	4%	11.6%
18	Paterberg	247.6	13.2	cobbles	360	12.9%	20.3%

== Participating teams ==
25 teams competed in the race. The 18 UCI WorldTeams were automatically invited and obliged to participate in the race, while an additional seven Professional Continental teams were given wildcard entries, when these were announced on 28 February 2017. Jens Keukeleire of Orica–Scott pulled out of the race on the morning of the start, making a total peloton of 199 riders.

UCI WorldTeams

- AG2R La Mondiale
- Astana
- Bahrain–Merida
- BMC Racing Team
- Bora–Hansgrohe
- Cannondale–Drapac
- Team Dimension Data
- FDJ
- Team Katusha–Alpecin
- LottoNL–Jumbo
- Lotto–Soudal
- Movistar Team
- Orica–Scott
- Quick-Step Floors
- Team Sky
- Team Sunweb
- Trek–Segafredo
- UAE Team Emirates

UCI Professional Continental teams

- Cofidis
- Direct Énergie
- Roompot–Nederlandse Loterij
- Sport Vlaanderen–Baloise
- Vérandas Willems–Crelan
- Wanty–Groupe Gobert
- Wilier Triestina–Selle Italia

== Result ==
Result
Rank	Rider	Team	Time
1	Philippe Gilbert (BEL)	Quick-Step Floors	6h 23' 45"
2	Greg Van Avermaet (BEL)	BMC Racing Team	+ 29"
3	Niki Terpstra (NED)	Quick-Step Floors	+ 29"
4	Dylan van Baarle (NED)	Cannondale–Drapac	+ 29"
5	Alexander Kristoff (NOR)	Team Katusha–Alpecin	+ 53"
6	Sacha Modolo (ITA)	UAE Team Emirates	+ 53"
7	John Degenkolb (GER)	Trek–Segafredo	+ 53"
8	Filippo Pozzato (ITA)	Wilier Triestina–Selle Italia	+ 53"
9	Sylvain Chavanel (FRA)	Direct Énergie	+ 53"
10	Sonny Colbrelli (ITA)	Bahrain–Merida	+ 53"
