= Léon Van den Haute =

Belgian sports journalist

- Born: October 9, 1887; Hemiksem, Belgium
- Died: February 23, 1931 (aged 43); Schaarbeek, Belgium
- Occupation: Journalist

Léon Van den Haute (9 October 1887 – 23 February 1931) was a Belgian sports journalist and the founder of the Tour of Flanders and Sportwereld.

== Personal life ==
Van den Haute was the third son of a notary public. After his studies – including at the Collège Saint-Michel in Etterbeek – he went to work as a merchant. In his spare time, he became active in Brussels sports life, contributing to several cycling magazines, such as Le Vélo. His career as a sports journalist soon becomes his main occupation: in 1909 he becomes the Brussels correspondent for the (then newly founded) weekly Sportvriend. Here he first comes into contact with Charles Steyaert, better known as Karel Van Wijnendaele.

== Work ==
=== Sportwereld ===
Cycling is becoming increasingly popular. The Brussels publishing company Patria wants to start its own sports magazine and attracts Léon Van den Haute for this purpose. Through his contacts with e.g. Sportvriend, he can gather a nice group of employees around him, including Charles Steyaert. On 12 September 1912, the first issue of the new magazine Sportwereld appears. Léon Van den Haute takes care of the organisational and financial side of the magazine; Charles Steyaert, thanks to his journalistic capacities, grows into the position of chief editor. He writes under the pseudonym Karel van Wijnendaele (after the castle of the same name in his native village Torhout).

=== The Tour of Flanders ===
The idea of a cycle race passing through Flanders is not new. In the first decade of the 20th century, there have already been initiatives such as the Omloop der Vlaanders (which, however, remain without much consequence). For Sportwereld, such sporting events clearly offer publicity opportunities. Léon Van den Haute had already gained experience in organising cycling races. An own round following the example of the Tour de France is a logical next step.

==== The first Tours ====
Léon Van den Haute works out the concept of the Ronde and finances the whole project. He also takes care of the practical implementation (from appointments with the different villages and cities for the checkpoints, the inspection of the state of the roads, even the hanging of the signposts the day before the race). Many cities were not keen on the passage of a cycle race through their streets. The Sportwereld of 21 May 1913 shows that cities like Lokeren and Oudenaarde denied the passage of the race, so the route had to be changed. In the end, the first edition is not a great success. In Sportwereld, however, the (own) race is reported with great enthusiasm. Despite the setback of the first edition, Léon Van den Haute wants to give this cycling race a second chance. This second edition would take place earlier in the year, as a start of the cycling season. Because of the adapted planning and the intensive coverage in Sportwereld this edition attracted more attention. Due to the outbreak of World War I later that year, any subsequent versions are suspended.

==== A "new" Tour ====
Immediately after World War I, Léon Van den Haute wanted to take up the thread with a third edition, against the advice of his comrade Karel Van Wijnendaele. Because of the post-war situation (such as the bad state of the roads) it seemed impossible to organise a cycling race. Van den Haute went ahead and spearheaded organisation of the race, in spite of the high price of bicycle equipment in the postwar period. This became Léon van den Haute claim to fame in the cycling world. Outside of his "own" newspaper, his actions garnered positive media attention from various publishers.

Since that first "new" Tour of Flanders in 1919, the Tour of Flanders has been held every year, even during the Second World War. Van den Haute remains intensively involved with the organization; for example, he himself makes the necessary reconnaissance trips for the Tours. In 1926, Karel Van Wijnendaele takes over the organisation.

=== Later life ===
Business went well and Léon Van den Haute managed to convince Karel Van Wijnendaele to buy the newspaper together; Karel Van Wijnendaele's popularity was needed to keep the magazine growing. Even in private management, the roles remain clearly divided: Léon holds the organisational and financial reins, Charles wields the pen. Edouard Hermès, a collaborator of Les Sports Illustrés, described Van den Haute in his memoirs as shy and by no means a fluent speaker, unlike Karel Van Wijnendaele. Léon Van den Haute's health deteriorates. In the mid-twenties, he has to leave the organisation of both the newspaper and the round to others. From that moment on, Karel Van Wijnendaele becomes the organizer of the Ronde. Van den Haute remains the "father of the Ronde" (title given to him by Karel Van Wijnendaele). His death is reported in many newspapers. Also in its own Sportwereld is of course much attention paid to their founder.
