= Ann Van Sevenant =

Belgian philosopher

Ann Van Sevenant (born 10 June 1959) is a Belgian philosopher.

== Biography ==
Van Sevenant was born in Torhout, Belgium. After her humanities, she studied Film and Photography at the Lucas School of Art in Brussels.

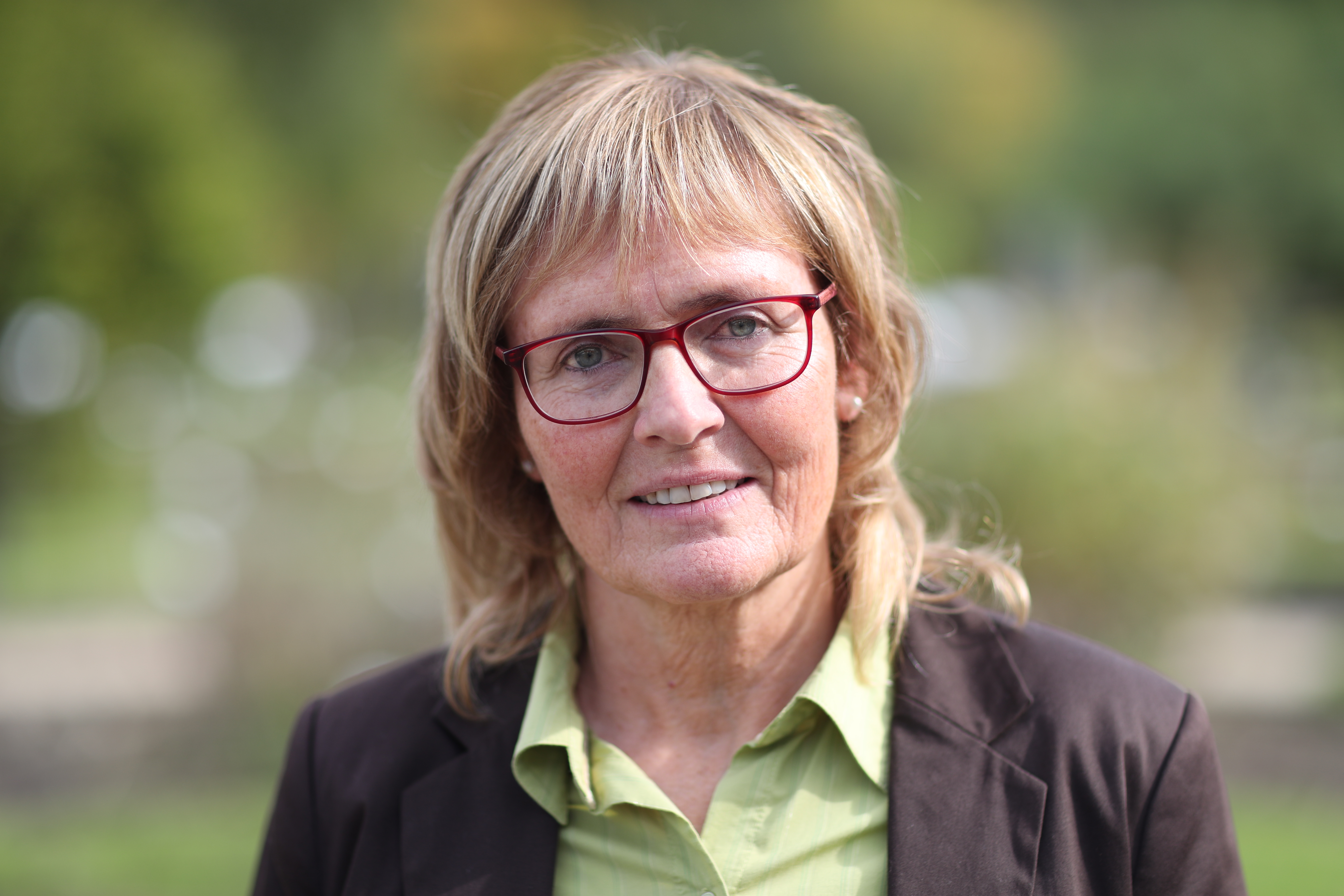

Inspired by the teaching of Jan Wüst, she decided to study philosophy at the Vrije Universiteit Brussel (VUB), where she took the courses of Leopold Flam, Hubert Dethier and Annie Reniers.

After having obtained her master's degree in 1982, she lived in Rome, where she studied history of art and aesthetics at the University La Sapienza, and attended the courses of Mario Perniola and Emilio Garroni. While preparing her doctoral thesis, she took classes with Samuel IJsseling in Leuven and later in Paris the seminars of Jacques Derrida, who was an important source of inspiration. She obtained her PhD in 1987, with a thesis entitled "Benjamin Fondane's Aesthetics. Inquiry on the autonomy of art."

Ann Van Sevenant was professor of philosophy at the University of Antwerp from 1989 to 2004. She lectured (2007/2008) at the Philosophicum de Kabgayi (Ruanda) and was invited at different universities (Urbino, Palermo, Rome, Amsterdam, Leiden, Nijmegen, Utrecht, Paris, Albany, Haifa, Oxford).

She has published numerous articles in four languages and eighteen books on contemporary philosophy and aesthetics (see bibliography). Her work has been discussed in several journals. She is an independent researcher and gives conferences at home and abroad.

== Bibliography ==
- Het verhaal van de filosofie. Handzame inleiding tot de wijsbegeerte van vroeger en nu, Antwerpen-Baarn, Hadewijch, 1992 (2nd ed. 1993, 3rd ed. 1996)
- Deconstructie. Een multidisciplinaire benadering, Leuven-Amersfoort, Acco, 1992
- La decostruzione e Derrida, Palermo, Aestetica, 1992
- Il filosofo dei poeti. L'estetica di Benjamin Fondane, Milano, Mimesis, 1994
- Poëtica van de architectuur, Antwerp-Baarn, Hadewijch, 1994
- Met water schrijven. De filosofie in het computertijdperk, Antwerp-Baarn, Hadewijch, 1997
- Importer en philosophie, Paris, Paris-Méditerranée, 1999 (Prize 2000 "Académie Royale de Langue et de Littérature Françaises de Belgique")
- Ecrire à la lumière. Le philosophe et l'ordinateur, Paris, Galilée, 1999
- Ademruimte. Van cultuurproduct tot productcultuur, Leende, Damon, 2000
- Philosophie de la sollicitude, Paris, Vrin, 2001
- Sexual Outercourse. Philosophy of Lovemaking, Leuven-Paris-Dudly, Peeters, 2005
- Wat zou de wereld zijn zonder filosofie?, with Samuel IJsseling, Kampen, Klement, 2007
- Levenswerk. Filosofie en aanvaarding, Antwerp, Garant, 2009
- Kleine filosofie van het vrijen, Antwerp, Garant, 2009
- Filosofie in honderd woorden, Antwerp, Garant, 2010
- Les Mondes de Jean Cocteau. Poétique et Esthétique/ Jean Cocteau's Worlds. Poetics and Aesthetics (livre + dvd), en collaboration avec David Gullentops, Paris, Non Lieu, 2012
- Ainsi pensait Zarathoustra. Une philosophie avant la lettre, Paris, Non Lieu, 2017
- Filosofie en fictie. Denkbeelden in dialoog, Utrecht, Klement, 2018
- Thus Replied Zarathustra, Mimesis International, 2020
- Levensecht. Nep is geen optie, Antwerpen, Gompel&Svacina, 2021
- Sprekend lichaam. De metabole mens, Antwerpen, Gompel&Svacina, 2023
