= Patrick Ouchène =

Belgian singer (born 1966)

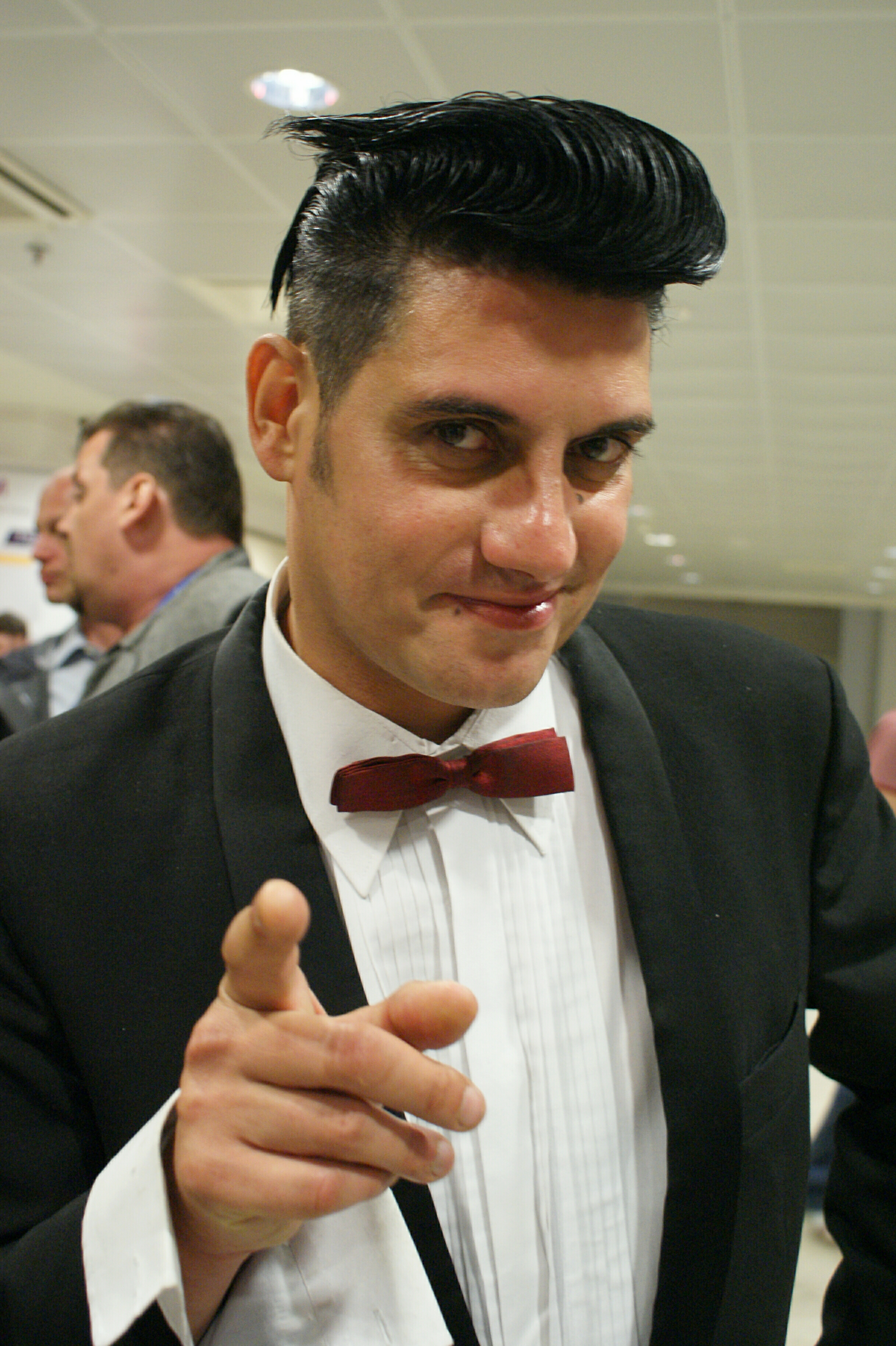

Background information
- Born: Patrick Ouchène; 5 December 1966 (age 59); Brussels, Belgium
- Genres: Pop, pop-rock, rock 'n' roll
- Occupation: Singer
- Instruments: Vocals
- Years active: 2002–present

Patrick Ouchène (born 5 December 1966) is a Belgian singer, best known for being the lead singer of the rockabilly band Runnin' Wild.

== Eurovision 2009 ==
On 17 February his band, Copycat, was chosen internally to represent Belgium at the Eurovision Song Contest 2009 in Moscow, Russia, with the song "Copycat". And on 10 March he was officially revealed as the choice for Belgium in Moscow, Patricks entry was also for the first time released. The song missed out on the final, finishing second-last (17th) with only one point.

Preceded by Ishtar with "O Julissi"	Belgium in the Eurovision Song Contest; 2009	Succeeded by Tom Dice with "Me and My Guitar"
