= Ishtar (band) =

Belgian folk band

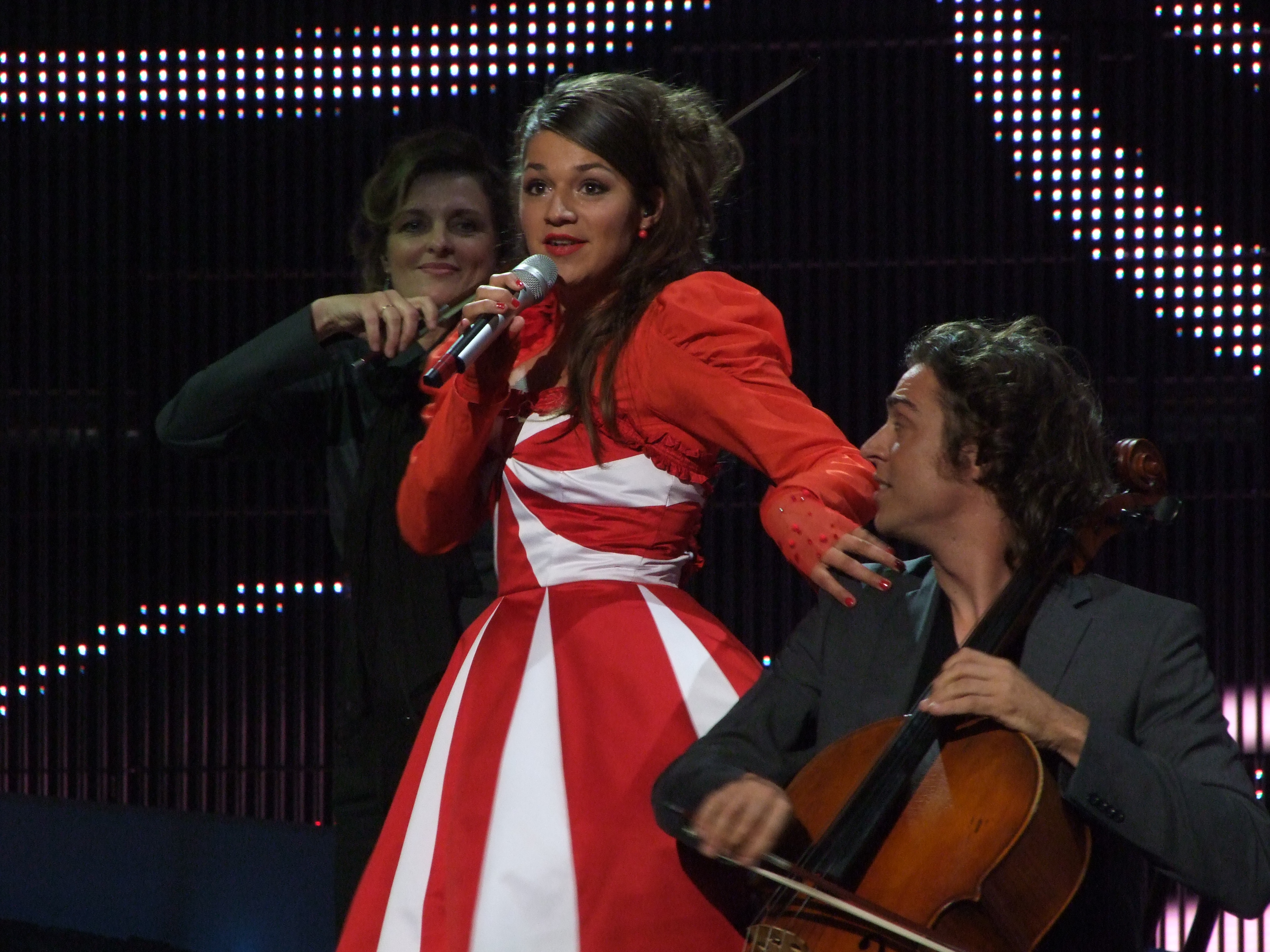
- Ishtar performing in Belgrade, May 2008

Background information
- Origin: Belgium
- Genres: Folk
- Members: Soetkin Baptist; Michel Vangheluwe; Ann Vandaele; Marleen Vandaele; Els Vandaele; Hans Vandaele; Lode Cartrysse; Frank Markey; Korneel Taeckens; Karel Vercruysse

Ishtar is a Belgian (Flemish) folk band who represented Belgium at the Eurovision Song Contest 2008 with the song "O Julissi", sung in an imaginary language. They competed in the first semi-final on 20 May 2008.

== O Julissi ==
"O Julissi" is a song by Ishtar. The band's site claims that the song is in an imaginary language. There is, however, a certain similarity to Ukrainian; in particular, the first line is fully understandable (Ukrainian "Ой у лісі на ялині", meaning "Oh, in the forest on a spruce"). The folk song represented Belgium at the semi-finals of Eurovision Song Contest 2008 on 20 May 2008 in Belgrade, but did not proceed to the finals. The single was released 14 March 2008. The song entered the Belgian Ultratop at #7. In its second week, O Julissi topped the list.

Ishtar's song was elected after they won the final of Eurosong 2008. Ishtar, until then an unknown band, defeated better known artists, like pop singers Sandrine and Brahim. The other contestants in the final were rock group Paranoiacs and Nelson, who had written a modern ballad.

== Band members ==
- Soetkin Baptist
- Michel Vangheluwe
- Ann Vandaele
- Marleen Vandaele
- Els Vandaele
- Hans Vandaele
- Lode Cartrysse
- Frank Markey
- Korneel Taeckens
- Karel Vercruysse

Preceded by The KMG's with "Love Power"	Belgium in the Eurovision Song Contest; 2008	Succeeded by Patrick Ouchène with "Copycat"
