= The KMG's =

Belgian band

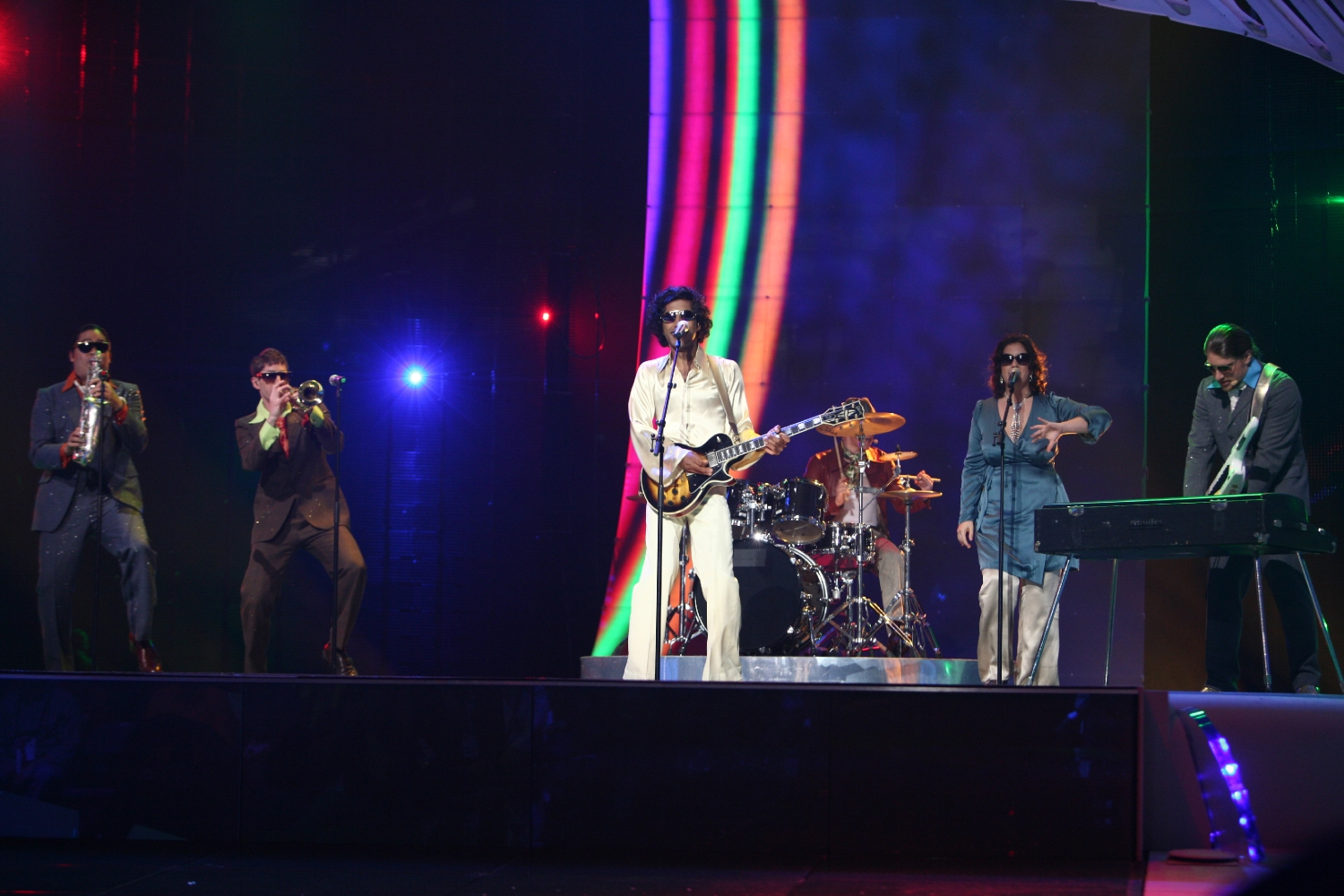
The KMG's

The KMG's (Krazy Mess Groovers) is a Belgian group that won the chance to represent Belgium with the song "Love Power" in the Eurovision Song Contest 2007 in Helsinki, Finland.

Since the Eurovision Song Contest only allow six performers on stage at one time, a part of the group did not perform at the song contest. Those who participated were Sexyfire, Mr Scotch, Mr French Kiss, Big Boss, Mr Cream and Lady Soulflower. At Eurovision, they performed 24th in the running order and were not announced for the top 10 qualifiers having placed 26th in a pool of 28 finishing with 14 points.

== Members ==
- Sexyfire (Wakas Ashiq) (Pakistani ancestry) – vocal
- Mr Scotch (Piotr Paluch) (Polish ancestry) – keyboards
- Mr French Kiss (Raphaël Hallez) (French-born) – trumpet
- Big Boss (Tuan N'Guyen) (born in Liège, Vietnamese ancestry) – alto saxophone
- The Answer – trombone
- Mr DeeBeeDeeBop – baritone saxophone
- Captain Thunder – electric guitar
- Mr Cream (François Cremer) – drummer
- Mr Y – vocal
- Lady Soulflower (Chrystel Wautier) (born in La Louvière, Ukrainian ancestry) – vocal

Preceded by Kate Ryan with "Je t'adore"	Belgium in the Eurovision Song Contest; 2007	Succeeded by Ishtar with "O Julissi"
