= Belgium in the Eurovision Song Contest 2008 =

- Eurovision Song Contest 2008
- Participating broadcaster: Vlaamse Radio- en Televisieomroeporganisatie (VRT)
- Country: Belgium
- Selection process: Eurosong '08
- Selection date: 9 March 2008

Competing entry
- Song: "O Julissi"
- Artist: Ishtar
- Songwriters: Michel Vangheluwe

Placement
- Semi-final result: Failed to qualify (17th)

Participation chronology

Belgium was represented at the Eurovision Song Contest 2008 with the song "O Julissi", written by Michel Vangheluwe, and performed by the band Ishtar. The Belgian participating broadcaster, Flemish Vlaamse Radio- en Televisieomroeporganisatie (VRT), selected its entry for the contest through the national final Eurosong '08. The competition featured twenty competing entries and consisted of seven shows. In the final on 9 March 2008, "O Julissi Na Jalini" performed by Ishtar was selected as the winner via a public televote. The song was later retitled as "O Julissi".

Belgium was drawn to compete in the first semi-final of the Eurovision Song Contest which took place on 20 May 2008. Performing during the show in position 6, "O Julissi" was not announced among the 10 qualifying entries of the first semi-final and therefore did not qualify to compete in the final. It was later revealed that Belgium placed seventeenth out of the 19 participating countries in the semi-final with 16 points.

== Background ==
Prior to the 2008 contest, Belgium had participated in the Eurovision Song Contest forty-nine times since its debut as one of seven countries to take part in 1956. Since then, they have won the contest on one occasion in 1986 with the song "J'aime la vie", performed by Sandra Kim. Following the introduction of semi-finals for the 2004 contest, Belgium had been featured in only one final. In 2007, "Love Power" performed by The KMG's placed twenty-sixth in the semi-final and failing to advance to the final.

The Belgian participation in the contest alternates between two broadcasters: Flemish Vlaamse Radio- en Televisieomroeporganisatie (VRT) and Walloon Radio-télévision belge de la Communauté française (RTBF) at the time, with both broadcasters sharing the broadcasting rights. The participating broadcaster for the 2008 contest was VRT. Both broadcasters –and their predecessors– had selected the Belgian entry using national finals and internal selections in the past. In 2006, VRT organised the national final Eurosong in order to select the entry, while in 2007, RTBF internally selected both the song and artist. On 24 April 2007, VRT confirmed its participation in the 2008 contest and announced that the Eurosong national final would be held to select its entry.

== Before Eurovision ==
=== Eurosong '08 ===
Eurosong '08 was the national final that selected the Belgian entry in the Eurovision Song Contest 2008. The competition consisted of seven shows that commenced on 27 January 2008 and concluded with a final on 9 March 2008 where the winning song and artist were selected. All shows took place in Studio 5 at the VRT studios in Brussels, hosted by Bart Peeters and were broadcast on Eén. The final was also broadcast online at the official Eurovision Song Contest website eurovision.tv.

==== Format ====
Twenty entries were selected to compete in Eurosong. Four heats took place on 27 January 2008, 3 February 2008, 10 February 2008 and 17 February 2008 with each show featuring five entries. The top two as determined by public televoting qualified to the semi-finals, while a panel of experts also selected two wildcards out of the third and fourth placed acts in the heats to advance. Two semi-finals took place on 24 February and 2 March 2008 with each show featuring five entries. The top two as determined by public televoting qualified to the final, while the expert panel also selected a wildcard out of the third and fourth placed acts in the semi-finals to advance. The final took place on 9 March 2008 where the winner was chosen by public televoting.

During each of the seven shows, the expert panel provided commentary and feedback to the artists as well as selected entries to advance in the competition. The experts were:

- Katrina Leskanich – American singer, winner of Eurovision for the United Kingdom in 1997 as part of Katrina and the Waves
- Kris Wauters – musician, represented Belgium in 1991 as part of Clouseau
- Marcel Vanthilt – singer and television presenter

==== Competing entries ====
A submission period was opened on 24 April 2007 for artists and songwriters to submit their entries until 23 November 2007. The twenty acts selected by VRT for the competition from 450 entries received during the submission period were announced on 17 December 2007.

Artist	Song	Songwriter(s)
A Butterfly Mind	"Lonely Hearts on Wheels"	Annelies Cappaert
Brahim	"What I Like About You"	Brahim Attaeb, Alan Glass
Di Bono	"I'm Not Sorry"	Frederic Di Bono, Liset Alea
EFR	"Your Guiding Star"	Sergio Quisquater, Vincent Pierins, Patrick Hamilton
Elisa	"Around the World"	Ove Andre Brenna
Ellis-T	"My Music"	Regi Penxten
Esther	"Game Over"	Alan Ross, David James, John McLaughin, Esther Sels, Ingrid Mank
Eva Darche	"We Breathe"	Marc Paelinck, Jamie Winchester
Femme Fatale	"Decadence"	Gerard James Borg, Mik Tanczos, Frank Jordens
Francesco Palmeri	"Vagabundo"	Francesco Palmeri
Geena Lisa	"Wheel of Time"	Geena Lisa, Sebastien Duthoit, Yves Barbieux
Ishtar	"O Julissi Na Jalini"	Michel Vangheluwe
Katy Satyn	"Magical Sensation"	Jens Engelbrecht, Stina Engelbrecht, Anders Lennartsson, Göran Månsson
Kenza	"Breaking All the Rules"	Rudolf Hecke
Nelson	"If I Can't Find Love"	Nelson Morais
Paranoiacs	"Shout It Out"	Hans Stevens, Raf Stevens
Raevan	"Shut Down the Heatmachine"	Michael Garvin, Marc Paelinck
Sandrine	"I Feel the Same Way"	Michelle Lawson, Peter-John Vettese, Felix Howard
Tanya Dexters	"Addicted to You"	Thomas G:son, Bobby Ljunggren, Henrik Wikström
Tabitha Cycon	"Rumour Has It" / "It's a Beautiful Day"	Marc Paelinck, Marwenna Diame

==== Heats ====
The four heats took place on 27 January, 3 February, 10 February and 17 February 2008. In each show five entries competed and public televoting solely determined the top two that qualified to the semi-finals. An additional two entries were awarded wildcards by the expert panel from the third and fourth placed acts in the heats to proceed to the semi-finals.

Heat 1 – 27 January 2008
R/O	Artist	Song	Place	Result
1	Katy Satyn	"Magical Sensation"	1	Advanced
2	Raevan	"Shut Down the Heatmachine"	3–4	—N/a
3	Brahim	"What I Like About You"	2	Advanced
4	Eva Darche	"We Breathe"	5	—N/a
5	Femme Fatale	"Decadence"	3–4	—N/a

Heat 2 – 3 February 2008
R/O	Artist	Song	Place	Result
1	Kenza	"Breaking All the Rules"	3–4	—N/a
2	EFR	"Your Guiding Star"	3–4	—N/a
3	Ishtar	"O Julissi Na Jalini"	1	Advanced
4	Esther	"Game Over"	5	—N/a
5	Tanya Dexters	"Addicted to You"	2	Advanced

Heat 3 – 10 February 2008
R/O	Artist	Song	Place	Result
1	Ellis-T	"My Music"	3–4	—N/a
2	Tabitha Cycon	"Rumour Has It"	3–4	Wildcard
3	Di Bono	"I'm Not Sorry"	5	—N/a
4	Nelson	"If I Can't Find Love"	1	Advanced
5	Geena Lisa	"Wheel of Time"	2	Advanced

Heat 4 – 17 February 2008
R/O	Artist	Song	Place	Result
1	Francesco Palmeri	"Vagabundo"	5	—N/a
2	Paranoiacs	"Shout It Out"	2	Advanced
3	Elisa	"Around the World"	3–4	—N/a
4	A Butterfly Mind	"Lonely Hearts on Wheels"	3–4	Wildcard
5	Sandrine	"I Feel the Same Way"	1	Advanced

==== Semi-finals ====
The two semi-finals took place on 24 February and 2 March 2008. In each show five entries competed and public televoting solely determined the top two that qualified to the final. An additional entry was awarded a wildcard by the expert panel from the third and fourth placed acts in the semi-finals to proceed to the final. Tabitha Cycon changed the title of "Rumour Has It" to "It's a Beautiful Day" for the second semi-final.

Semi-final 1 – 24 February 2008
R/O	Artist	Song	Place	Result
1	Tanya Dexters	"Addicted to You"	5	—N/a
2	Nelson	"If I Can't Find Love"	1	Advanced
3	Paranoiacs	"Shout It Out"	2	Advanced
4	A Butterfly Mind	"Lonely Hearts on Wheels"	3–4	—N/a
5	Katy Satyn	"Magical Sensation"	3–4	—N/a

Semi-final 2 – 2 March 2008
R/O	Artist	Song	Place	Result
1	Geena Lisa	"Wheel of Time"	5	—N/a
2	Tabitha Cycon	"It's a Beautiful Day"	3–4	—N/a
3	Sandrine	"I Feel the Same Way"	2	Advanced
4	Ishtar	"O Julissi Na Jalini"	1	Advanced
5	Brahim	"What I Like About You"	3–4	Wildcard

==== Final ====
The final took place on 7 March 2008 where the five entries that qualified from the preceding two semi-finals competed. The winner, "O Julissi Na Jalini" performed by Ishtar, was selected solely by public televoting.

Final – 7 March 2008
R/O	Artist	Song	Place
1	Brahim	"What I Like About You"	4
2	Paranoiacs	"Shout It Out"	3
3	Nelson	"If I Can't Find Love"	5
4	Sandrine	"I Feel the Same Way"	2
5	Ishtar	"O Julissi Na Jalini"	1

==== Ratings ====
Viewing figures by show
Show	Date	Viewing figures		Ref.
Show	Date	Nominal	Share	Ref.
Heat 1	27 January 2008	1,250,569	45.6%	
Heat 2	3 February 2008	1,206,619	44.2%	
Heat 3	10 February 2008	1,188,071	42.4%	
Heat 4	17 February 2008	1,166,540	42.1%	
Semi-final 1	24 February 2008	1,173,015	41.9%	
Semi-final 2	2 March 2008	1,227,598	43.9%	
Final	7 March 2008	1,400,197	50.5%	

=== Promotion ===
Ishtar specifically promoted "O Julissi" as the Belgian Eurovision entry by appearing in the Netherlands during the RTL 4 programme Life and Cooking on 4 May 2008. The promotional activity was financially supported by Flemish Minister of Culture Bert Anciaux who conferred a state support of €25,000 to the band.

== At Eurovision ==
It was announced in September 2007 that the competition's format would be expanded to two semi-finals in 2008. According to the rules, all nations with the exceptions of the host country and the "Big Four" (France, Germany, Spain, and the United Kingdom) are required to qualify from one of two semi-finals in order to compete for the final; the top nine songs from each semi-final as determined by televoting progress to the final, and a tenth was determined by back-up juries. The European Broadcasting Union (EBU) split up the competing countries into six different pots based on voting patterns from previous contests, with countries with favourable voting histories put into the same pot. On 28 January 2008, a special allocation draw was held which placed each country into one of the two semi-finals. Belgium was placed into the first semi-final, to be held on 20 May 2008. The running order for the semi-finals was decided through another draw on 17 March 2008 and Belgium was set to perform in position 6, following the entry from San Marino and before the entry from Azerbaijan.

The two semi-finals and the final was broadcast in Belgium by both the Flemish and Walloon broadcasters. VRT broadcast the shows on één with commentary in Dutch by Bart Peeters and André Vermeulen. RTBF televised the shows on La Une with commentary in French by Jean-Pierre Hautier and Jean-Louis Lahaye. All shows were also broadcast by VRT on Radio 2 with commentary in Dutch by Michel Follet and Sven Pichal, and by RTBF on La Première with commentary in French by Patrick Duhamel and Corinne Boulangier. VRT appointed Sandrine Van Handenhoven as its spokesperson to announce the Belgian votes during the final.

=== Semi-final ===
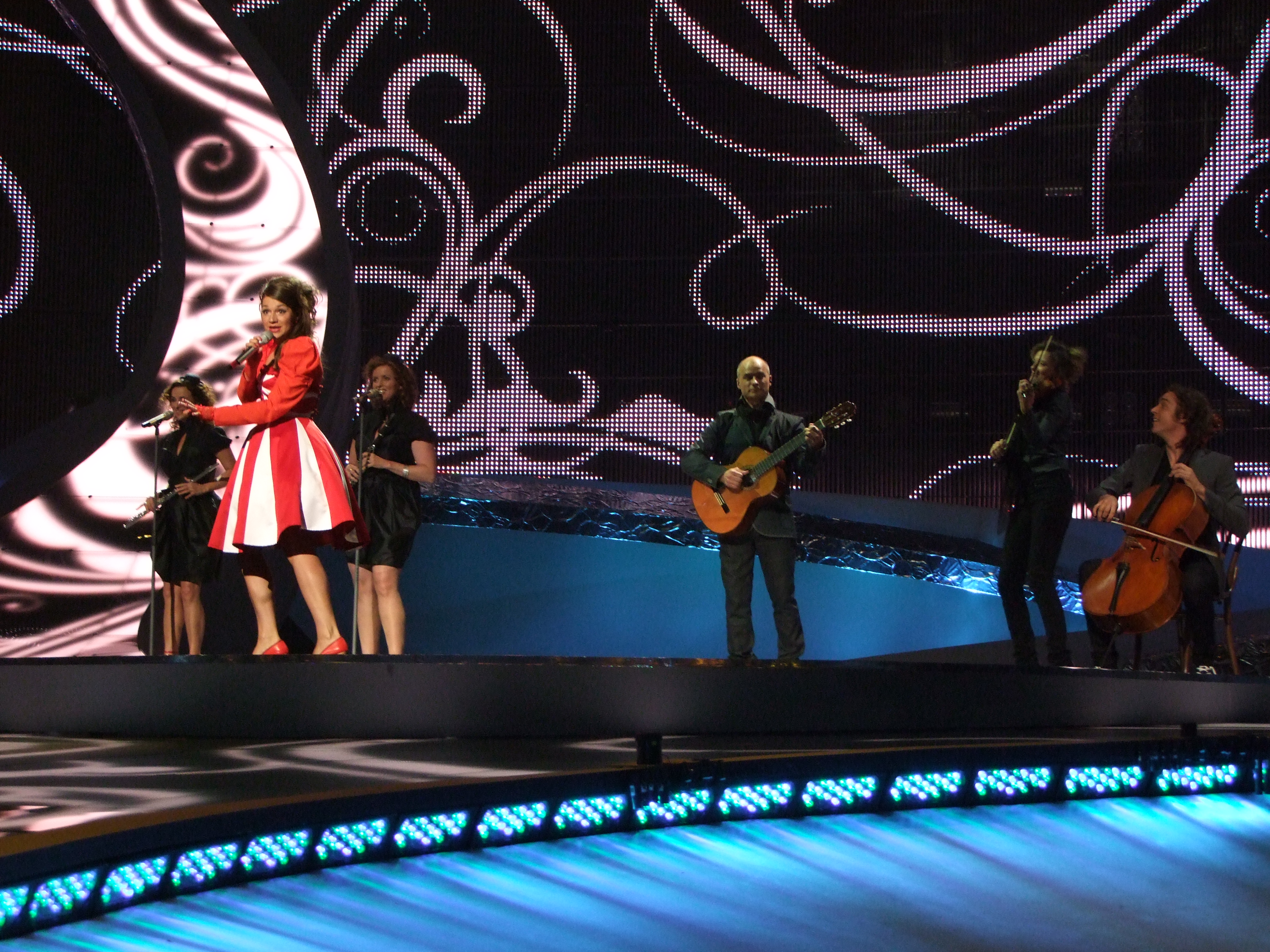
Ishtar during a rehearsal before the first semi-final

Ishtar took part in technical rehearsals on 11 and 15 May, followed by dress rehearsals on 19 and 20 May. The Belgian performance featured the members of Ishtar performing on stage with lead singer Soetkin Baptist in a red and white dress and walking intermittently between the other members throughout the song. Due to the band originally consisting of ten members, four of them were not featured during the performance. The stage setting was dark and the LED screens displayed graphics resembling musical notes. The Belgian performance was choreographed by Ricardo Overman.

At the end of the show, Belgium was not announced among the top 10 entries in the first semi-final and therefore failed to qualify to compete in the final. It was later revealed that Belgium placed seventeenth in the semi-final, receiving a total of 16 points.

=== Voting ===
Below is a breakdown of points awarded to Belgium and awarded by Belgium in the first semi-final and grand final of the contest. The nation awarded its 12 points to Armenia in the semi-final and the final of the contest.

==== Points awarded to Belgium ====
Points awarded to Belgium (Semi-final 1)
Score	Country
12 points	
10 points	Netherlands
8 points	
7 points	
6 points	Estonia
5 points	
4 points	
3 points	
2 points	
1 point	

==== Points awarded by Belgium ====
Points awarded by Belgium (Semi-final 1)
Score	Country
12 points	Armenia
10 points	Greece
8 points	Netherlands
7 points	Israel
6 points	Romania
5 points	Azerbaijan
4 points	Ireland
3 points	Russia
2 points	Finland
1 point	Norway

Points awarded by Belgium (Final)
Score	Country
12 points	Armenia
10 points	Turkey
8 points	Greece
7 points	Azerbaijan
6 points	Portugal
5 points	Israel
4 points	Spain
3 points	Russia
2 points	Norway
1 point	Ukraine
