= Karel Van Wijnendaele =

Belgian journalist and politician (1882–1961)

- Born: Carolus Ludovicius Steyaert; November 16, 1882; Torhout, Belgium
- Died: December 20, 1961 (aged 79); Deinze, Belgium
- Occupation: Journalist
- Years active: 1911-1961
- Notable credit: Tour of Flanders founder
- Title: editor

Karel Van Wijnendaele, pseudonym of Carolus Ludovicius Steyaert (Torhout, 16 November 1882 - Deinze, 20 December 1961), was a Flemish sports journalist. He was the founder and first organizer of the Tour of Flanders cycling classic.

== Biography ==
Van Wijnendaele was the fifth of 15 children of a family in the hamlet of Wijnendaele, near Torhout. His father, a flax worker, died when Karel was 18 months. He wrote in 1942: "Being born into a poor family was my strength. If you're brought up without frills ("sober opgekweekt wordt") and you know what hunger is ("door een mager leven gaat"), you grow up hard enough to withstand bike racing." He left school at 14, worked for a baker, looked after cows, washed bottles and delivered parcels. He worked for well-to-do French-speaking families in Brussels and Ostend and felt humiliated by the way they treated him.

Van Wijnendaele tried cycle-racing, won a few lesser prizes but soon turned to writing about cycling as a regional correspondent. (Note: Van Wijnendaele first wrote for De Torhoutenaer, his local paper, then from 1909 for Onze Kampioenen in Antwerp and Sportvriend in Izegem. It was then that he adopted his pen-name.) This attracted the attention of De Maeght and his collaborator, race organiser Léon Van den Haute, who asked van Wijnendaele to join their new paper Sportwereld. The first issue appeared in time for the Championship of Flanders on 12 September 1912. Van Wijnendaele became its editor on 1 January 1913.

In 1925 he became co-owner and in 1931 full owner of Sportwereld, thereby also owning the Tour of Flanders, until the sports paper and the event were bought by daily newspaper Het Nieuwsblad . He remained editor-in-chief of Het Nieuwsblad's sports section until his death in 1961. He is buried at the cemetery of Sint-Martens-Latem.

== Flemish nationalism ==
Van Wijnendaele is known to have linked cycling and the Tour of Flanders to Flemish emancipation, in a time when the Belgian elite was still French-speaking. His articles fed the myth of the Flandriens, Flemish men who rose above their humble origins and became cycling champions. In modern times, media uses the term Flandrien to denote winners and specialists of all cobbled classic races.

In 1964, a monument in honor of Van Wijnendaele was inaugurated near the top of the Oude Kwaremont, in the Ronde van Vlaanderenstraat (English: Tour of Flanders street) in Kluisbergen. The site is a pivotal location in the Tour of Flanders route.
