= Leopold Flam =

Belgian philosopher (1912-1995)

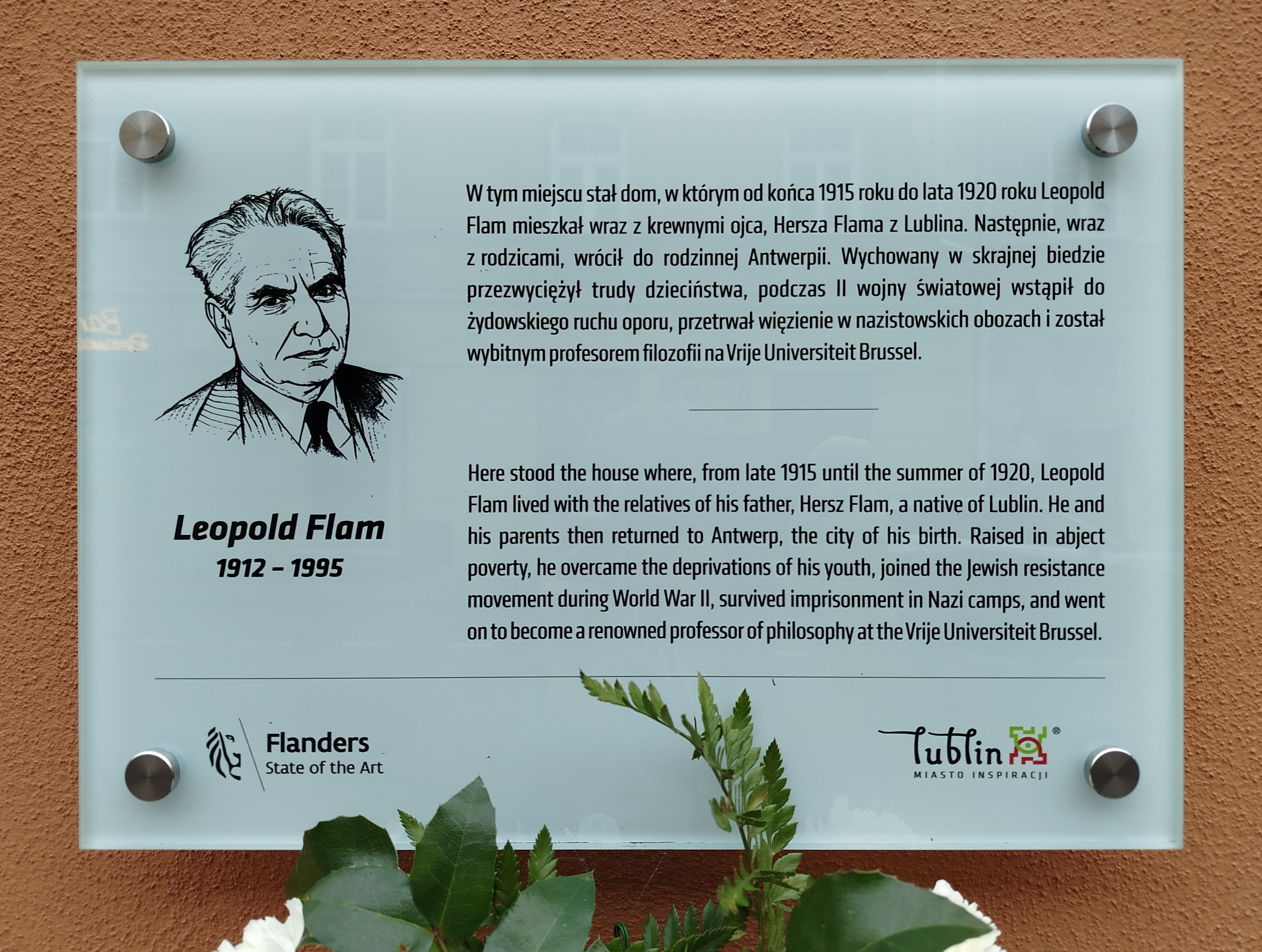
A commemorative plaque in Lublin that honors Leopold Flam

Leopold Flam (16 March 1912 – 29 September 1995) was a Belgian philosopher. Together with Alphonse De Waelhens, Chaïm Perelman and Rudolf Boehm, he was one of the leading philosophers of Belgium from the 1960s until the 1980s.

Born in Antwerp, Flam studied social sciences, political history, and philosophy at the University of Ghent and obtained a PhD in history. During World War II he was imprisoned in the Dossin Barracks at Mechelen and in the Buchenwald concentration camp. After the war, he became a professor at the Free University of Brussels.

He founded the Vlaamse vereniging voor Wijsbegeerte (1959) (E: Flemish League for Philosophy), later of Aurora. He became director of the magazine Geschiedenis in het onderwijs (E: History in education).

Flam died at his home in Vilvoorde, near Brussels, on 29 September 1995.

== Bibliography ==
- L'homme et la conscience tragique - Problèmes de temps présent, Presses Universitaires de Bruxelles, 1964
- Gestalten van de Westerse subjectiviteit, Wereldbibliotheek, 1965
- Le crépuscule des dieux et l'avenir de l'homme, Presses Universitaires de Bruxelles, 1966
- Démocratie et marxisme, Presses Universitaires de Bruxelles, 1969
- La philosophie au tournant de notre temps, Presses Universitaires de Bruxelles, 1970
- Naar de Dageraad, Kroniek en getuigenis van de oorlogsjaren 1943–45, VUBpress, 1996
- Ik zal alles verdragen, ook mezelf - Dagboeken en brieven, De Geus, Breda and Amsterdam, 2023, ISBN 978-9-04454-861-7

== Sources ==
- Leopold Flam
