= Torhout =

- City and municipality
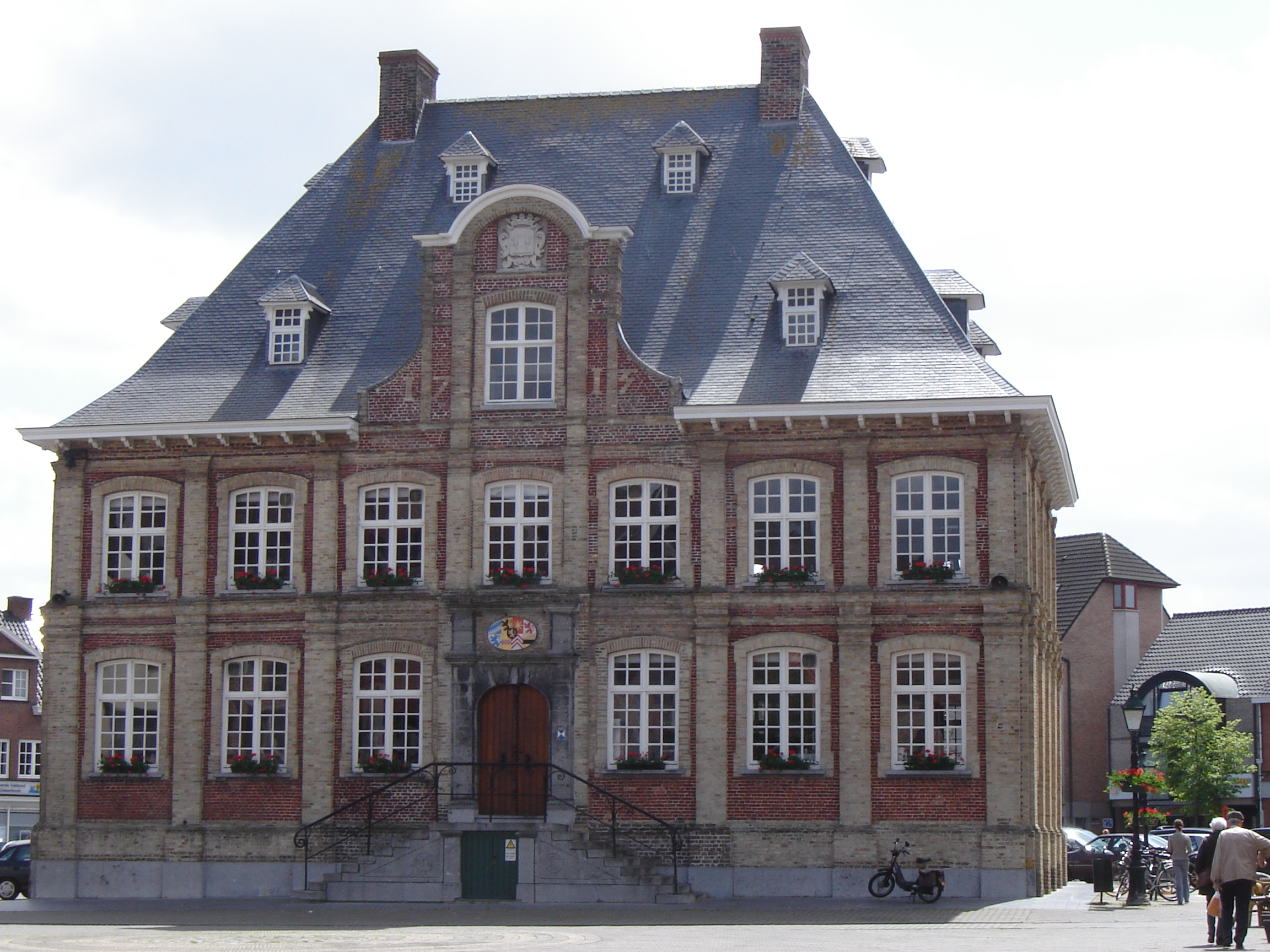
- Town Hall

- Flag Coat of arms

- Location of Torhout in West Flanders
- Interactive map of Torhout
- Location in Belgium
- Coordinates: 51°03′N 03°06′E
- Country: Belgium
- Community: Flemish Community
- Region: Flemish Region
- Province: West Flanders
- Arrondissement: Bruges

Government
  - Mayor: Kristof Audenaert (CD&V)
  - Governing parties: CD&V, Vooruit

Area
  - Total: 45.32 km^{2} (17.50 sq mi)

Population (2018-01-01)
  - Total: 20,530
  - Density: 453.0/km^{2} (1,173/sq mi)
- Postal codes: 8820
- NIS code: 31033
- Area codes: 050
- Website: www.torhout.be

Torhout (Dutch pronunciation: [ˈtɔrɦʌut]; French: Thourout; West Flemish: Toeroet) is a city and municipality located in the Belgian province of West Flanders. The municipality comprises the city of Torhout proper, the villages of Wijnendale and Sint-Henricus, and the hamlet of De Driekoningen. On 29 February 2024 Torhout had a total population of 24,891. The total area is 45.23 km^{2} which gives a population density of 445 inhabitants per km^{2}.

== People associated with Torhout ==
- Rimbert, a saint
- Josse van Huerter, first settler, and captain-major of the island of Faial in the Portuguese Azores.
- Karel Van Wijnendaele (Founder of Tour of Flanders (Tour of Flanders))
- Benny Vansteelant (Multiple World Champion Duathlon) and Joerie Vansteelant
- Luk Descheemaeker, winner at the 2nd Holocaust cartoon contest in Tehran, 2016.
- Hilde Crevits, Vice Minister-President of the Flemish Government and Flemish minister of Economy, Innovation, Work, Social economy and Agriculture; and former mayor of Torhout (2016-2018)
- Brahim Attaeb, R&B singer and presenter
- Gilles Gérard Meersseman, Catholic theologian and Church historian
- Ann Van Sevenant (born 1959), philosopher

== Festivities ==
Torhout-Werchter was until 1999 one of the largest annual pop festivals in Europe. Efforts were made to have a world music festival in Torhout after Torhout Werchter became Rock Werchter, held in Werchter only.

== Sports ==
The main football club of the city is Torhout 1992 KM.

== Sights ==
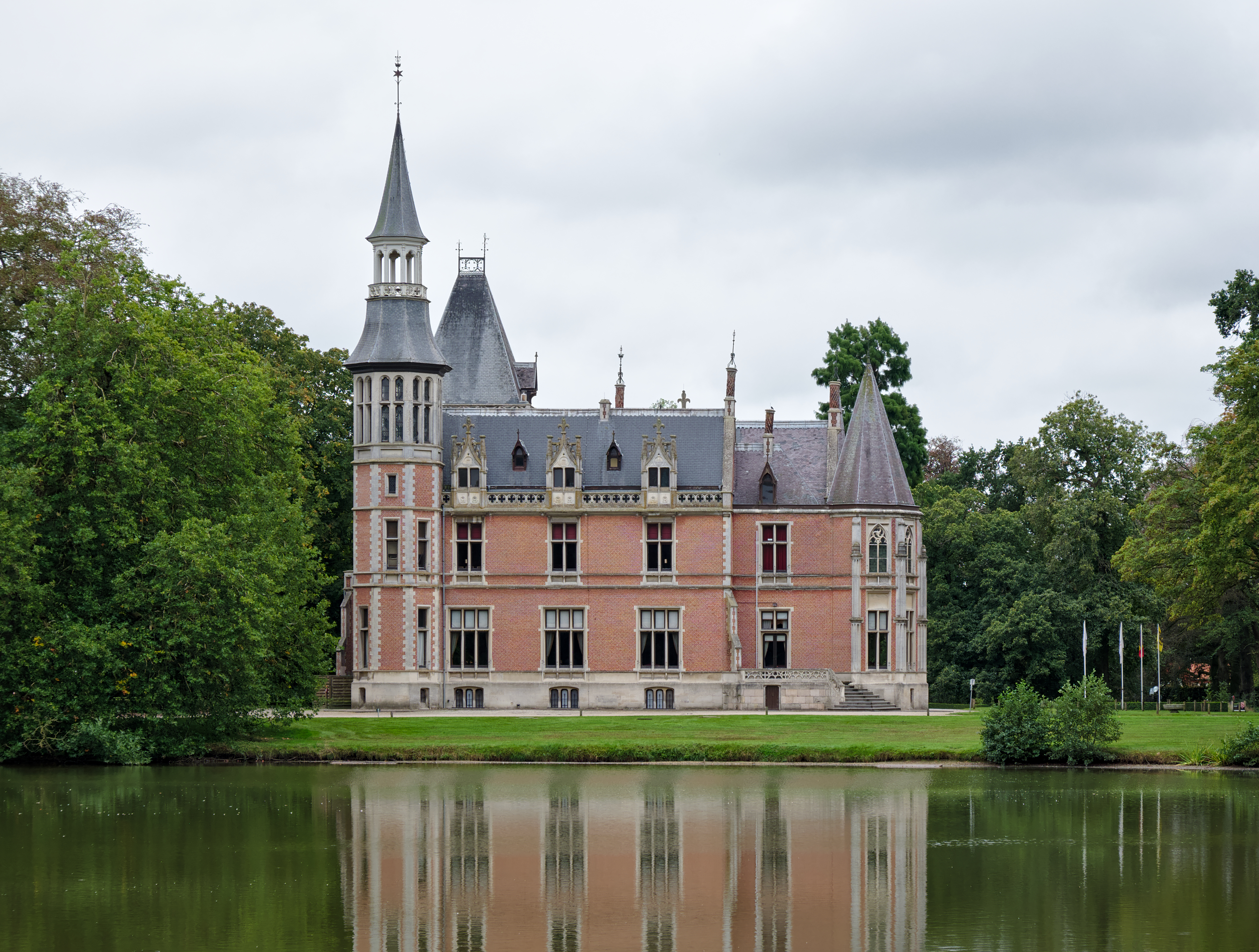
Aertrycke castle

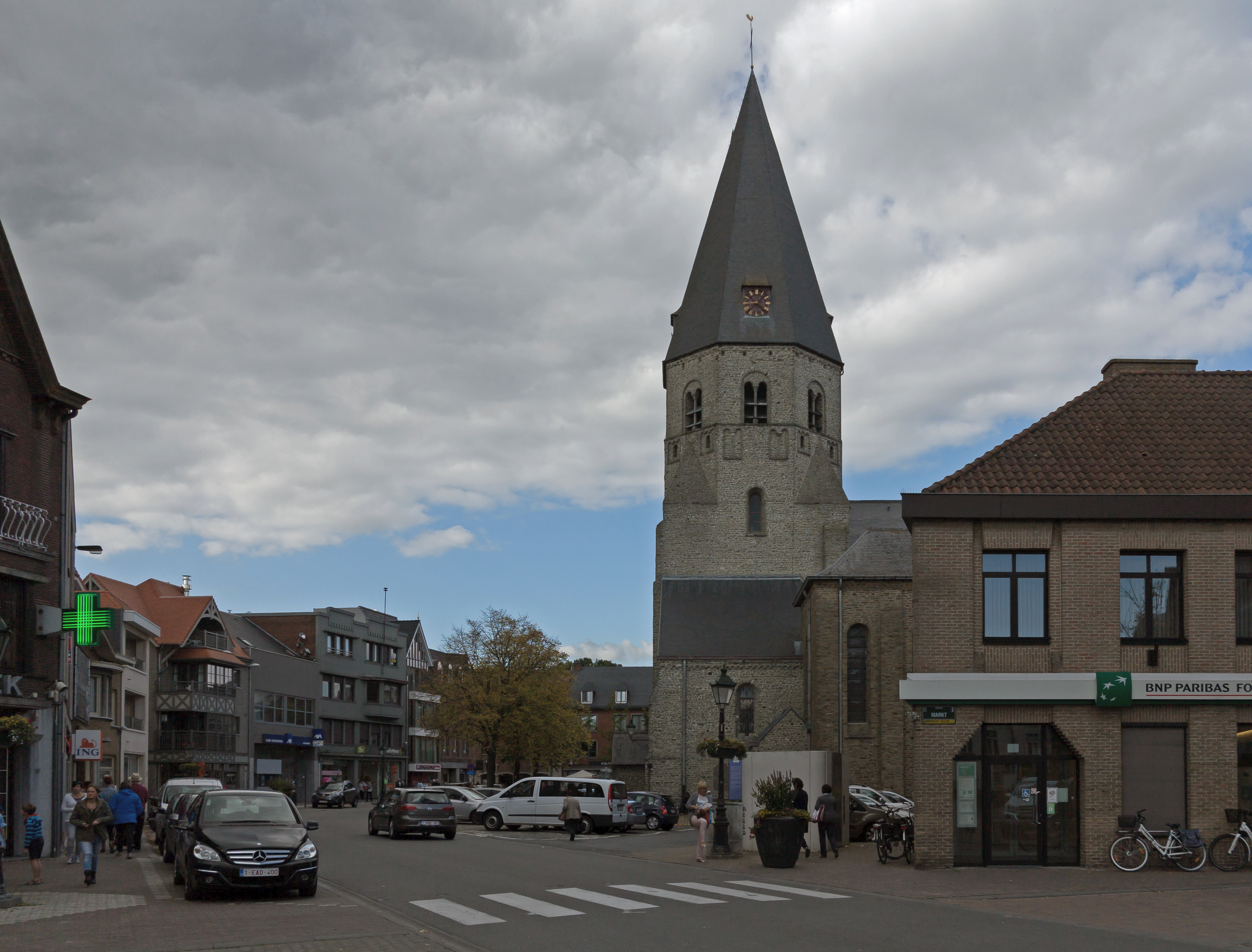
Church: Sint Pietersbandenkerk

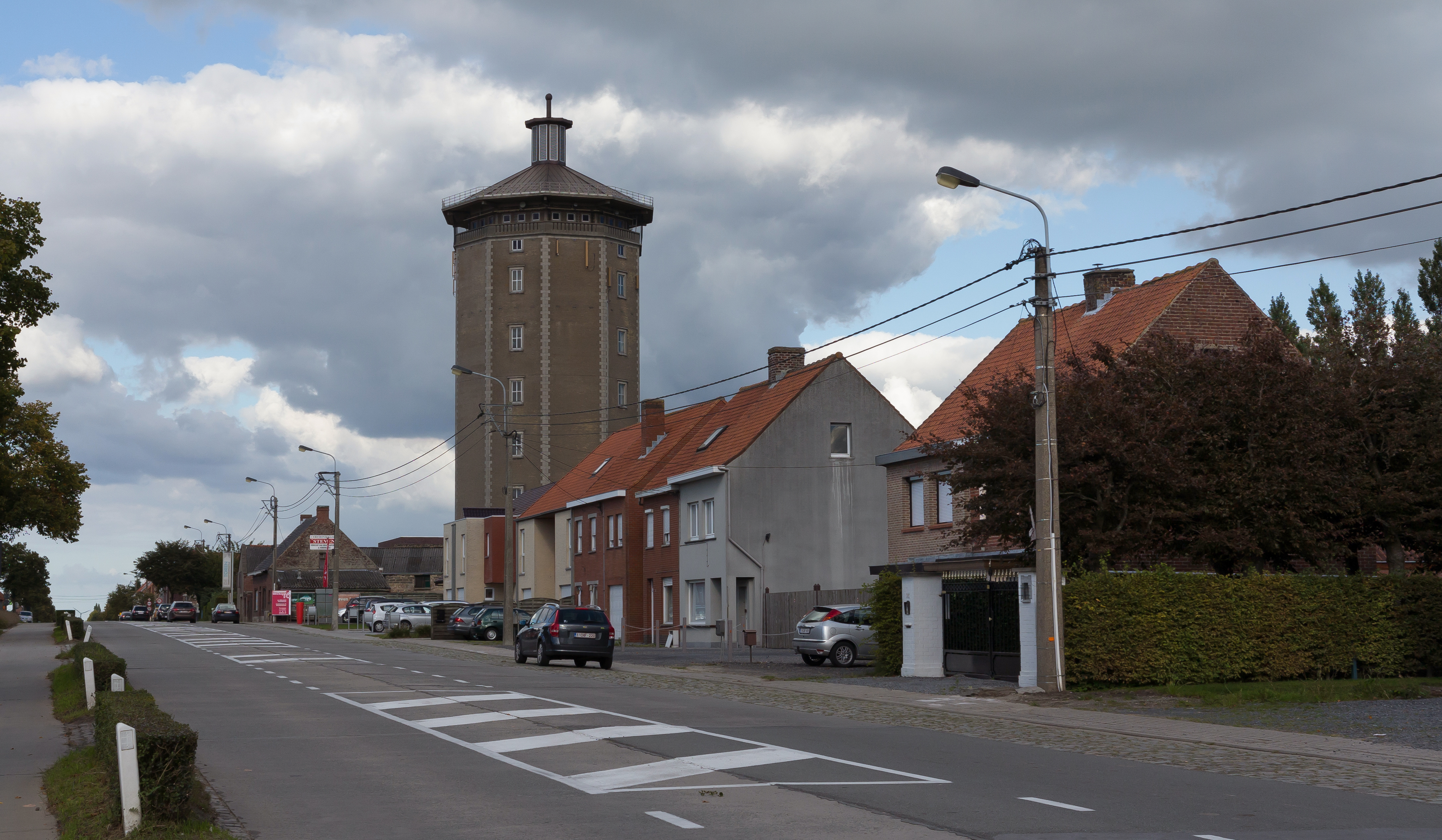
Watertower in Berg op Zoom
