= Kanarieberg =

Hill in Belgium

Coordinates: 50.7603°N 3.6529°E

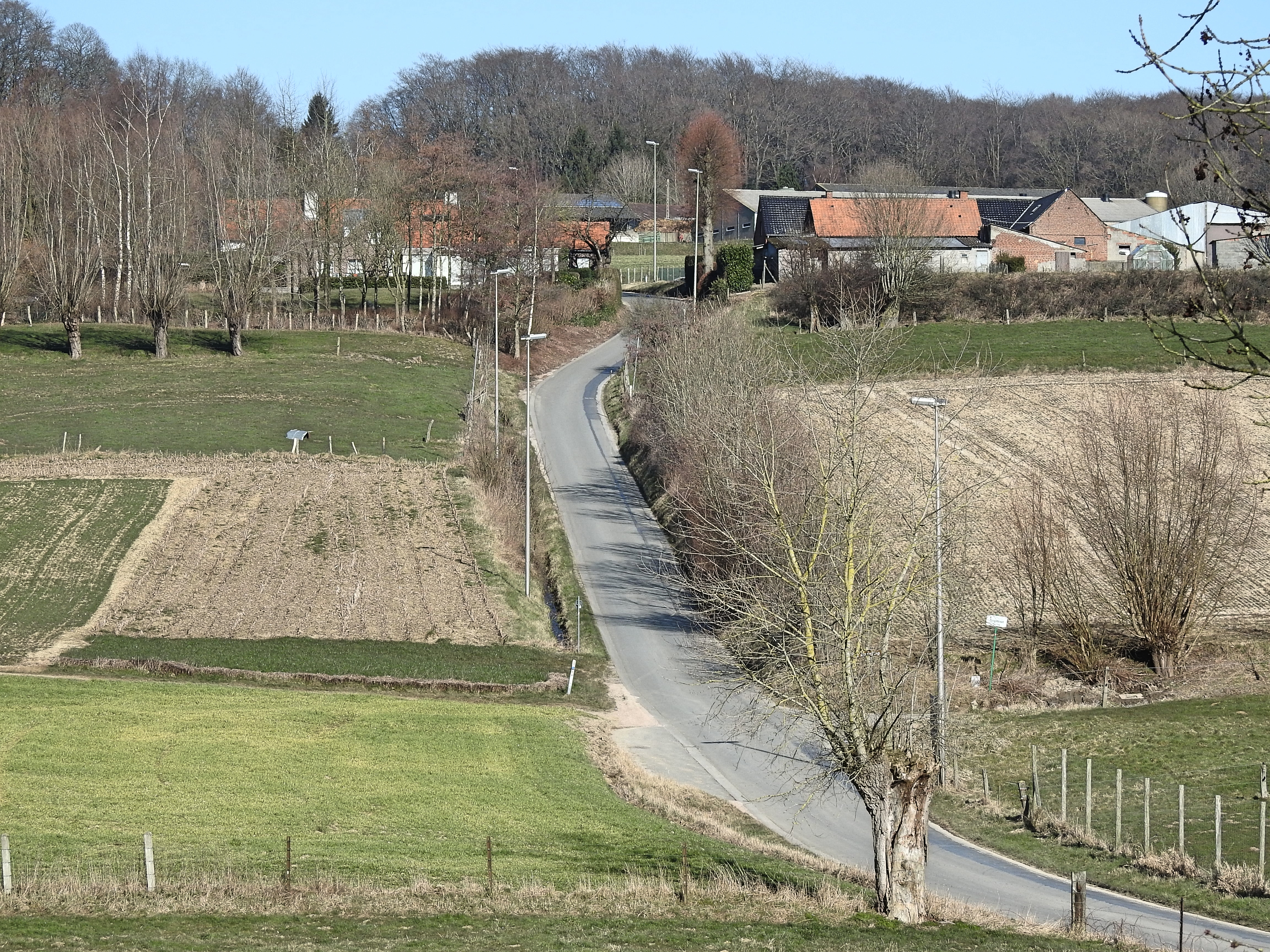
- Kanarieberg in 2018.
- Location: Flanders, Belgium
- Start: Ronse
- Gain in altitude: 77 m (253 ft)
- Length of climb: 1.0 km (0.62 mi)
- Maximum elevation: 131 m (430 ft)
- Average gradient: 7.7 %
- Maximum gradient: 14 %

Kanarieberg (English: Canary Hill) is the name of a road and hill in the municipality of Ronse, in the Belgian province of East Flanders. With its top at 131 m, it is one of the many hills in the Flemish Ardennes, located in the heart of the hill region. The road of the Kanarieberg starts gently before steadily getting steeper as it winds its way through the fields outside Ronse's city center. It is surfaced in smooth asphalt; its steepest point is 14%. The top of the Kanarieberg is in the Muziekbos (English: Music Forest).

== Cycling ==
The hill regularly features in the Flemish cycling races in spring. In 2014 the climb made its first appearance in the Tour of Flanders, in the roadbook just immediately before the second ascent of the Oude Kwaremont. The climb is also regularly included in the Three Days of De Panne, Halle–Ingooigem and occasionally in the Eneco Tour.
