= Brahim Attaeb =

Belgian R&B singer and radio and TV perssonality

Brahim
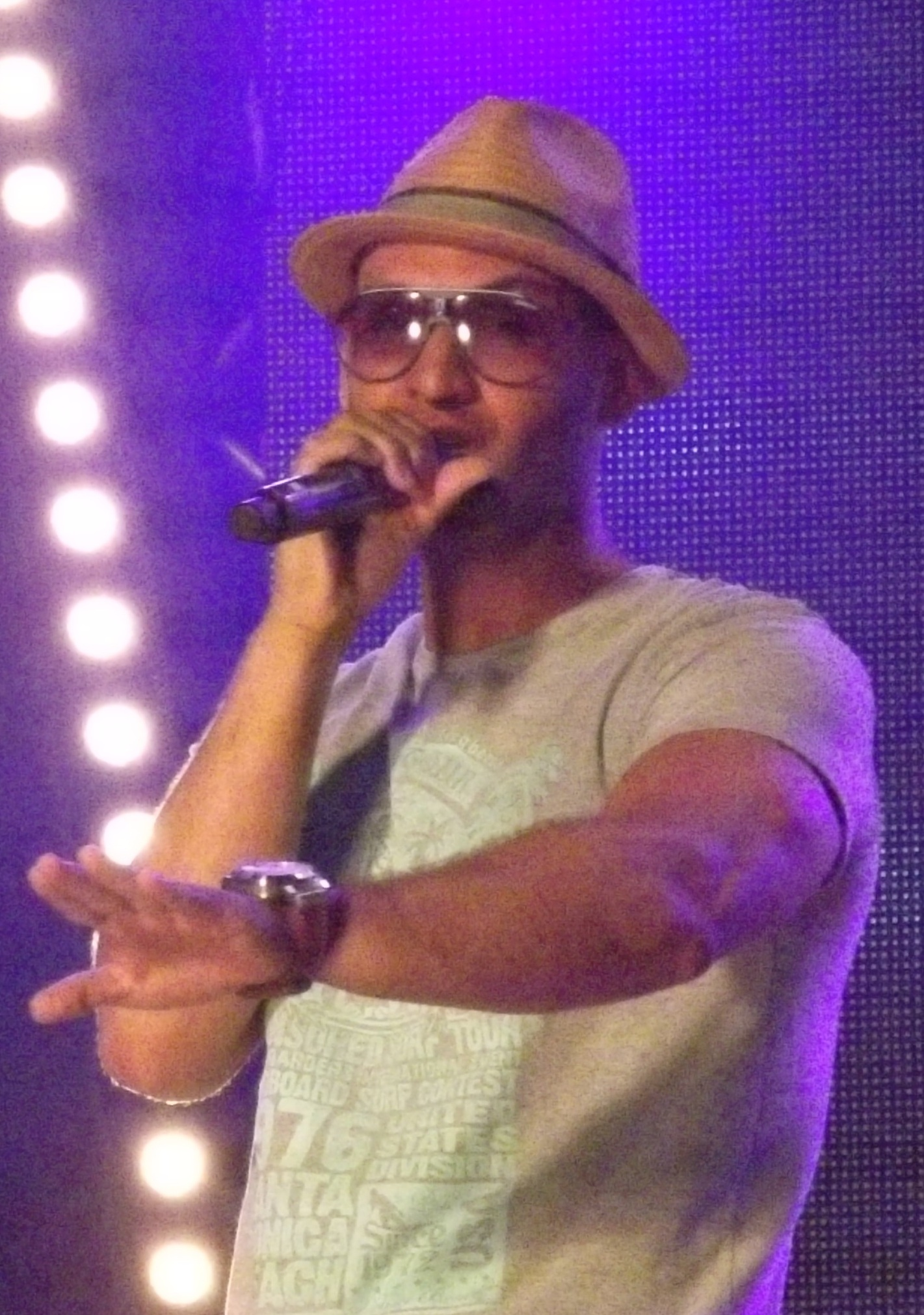
- Brahim performing during Radio 2 Zomerhit event (2012)

Background information
- Born: Brahim Attaeb; February 24, 1984 (age 42); Torhout, Belgium
- Genres: R&B
- Occupations: Singer, Radio and television personality
- Years active: 2003 – present

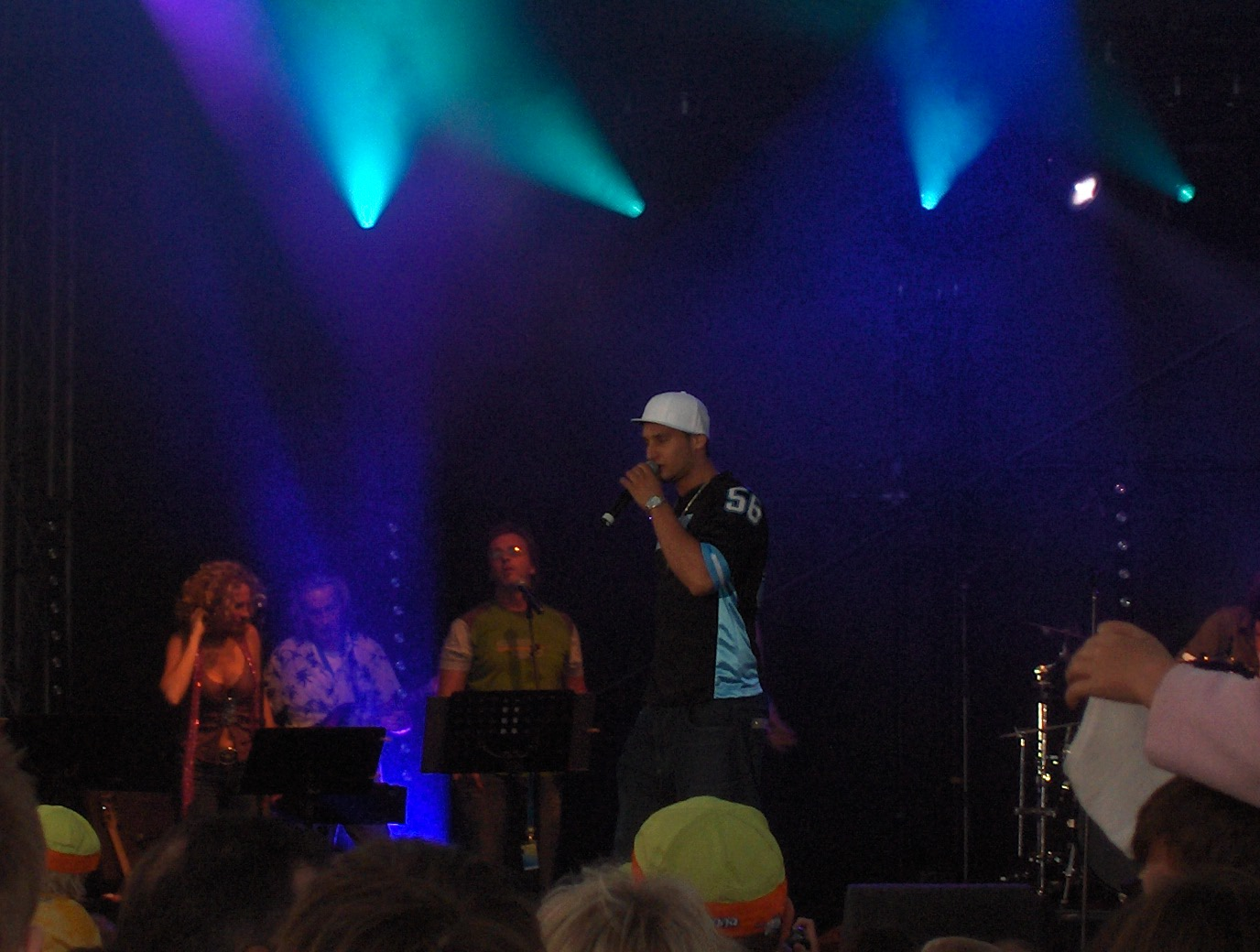
Brahim Attaeb (2005)

Brahim Attaeb better known by his stage name and mononym Brahim (born in Torhout, Belgium on 24 February 1984), is a Belgian R&B singer.

== Early life ==
Attaeb was born in Torhout, Belgium, to a Moroccan father and a Belgian (Flemish) mother.

== Discography ==
=== Albums ===
Year	Album	Peak positions	Certification
Year	Album	BEL (Fl) Ultratop	Certification
2003	My Life is Music	7	
2006	Najaha	–	
2006	Evolution	10	
2013	1984	35	

=== Singles ===
Year	Single	Peak positions		Certification	Album
Year	Single	BEL (Fl) Ultratop	BEL (Fl) Ultratip	Certification	Album
2003	"Turn the Music Up"	1	–		My Life is Music
2003	"I Wanna Be"	8	–		My Life is Music
2004	"Party with Me"	40	–		My Life is Music
2004	"Loco"	49	–		My Life is Music
2005	"Didi"	10	–		Najaha
2005	"Lei lei" (Brahim vs. Valton feat. Supasonic)	–	4		Najaha
2006	"P.O.W.E.R."	19	–		Najaha
2007	"Lamuka"	31	–		
2007	"So Into You"	26	–		Evolution
2008	"What I Like About You"	10	–		Evolution
2008	"Dance All Night"	–	3		Evolution
2010	"This Is What I Like"	–	37		
2011	"When the Lights Go Out"	–	20		
2012	"Be Mine Tonight"	–	20		1984
2013	"Get It Right"	–	29		1984
2013	"Show You Love"	–	37		1984
2013	"Ready to Go"	–	25		1984
2018	"In the Mood"	–	14		

Featured in

Year	Single	Peak positions		Certification	Album
Year	Single	BEL (Fl) Ultratop	BEL (Fl) Ultratip	Certification	Album
2012	"Tengo Tu Love" (Sie7e feat. Brahim & Abie Flinstone)	–	3		
2012	"De allereerste keer" (Jasine feat. Brahim)	–	36		
2012	"Meisjes" (Walter Ego feat. Brahim)	–	28		Meisjes
2012	"Goeiemorgend goeiendag" (Slongs Dievanongs feat. Brahim)	–	16		Goeiendag
2013	"Fly" (Robert Abigail & Brahim feat. P. Moody)	–	38		
