= Kortekeer =

Coordinates: 50.4758°N 3.3454°E

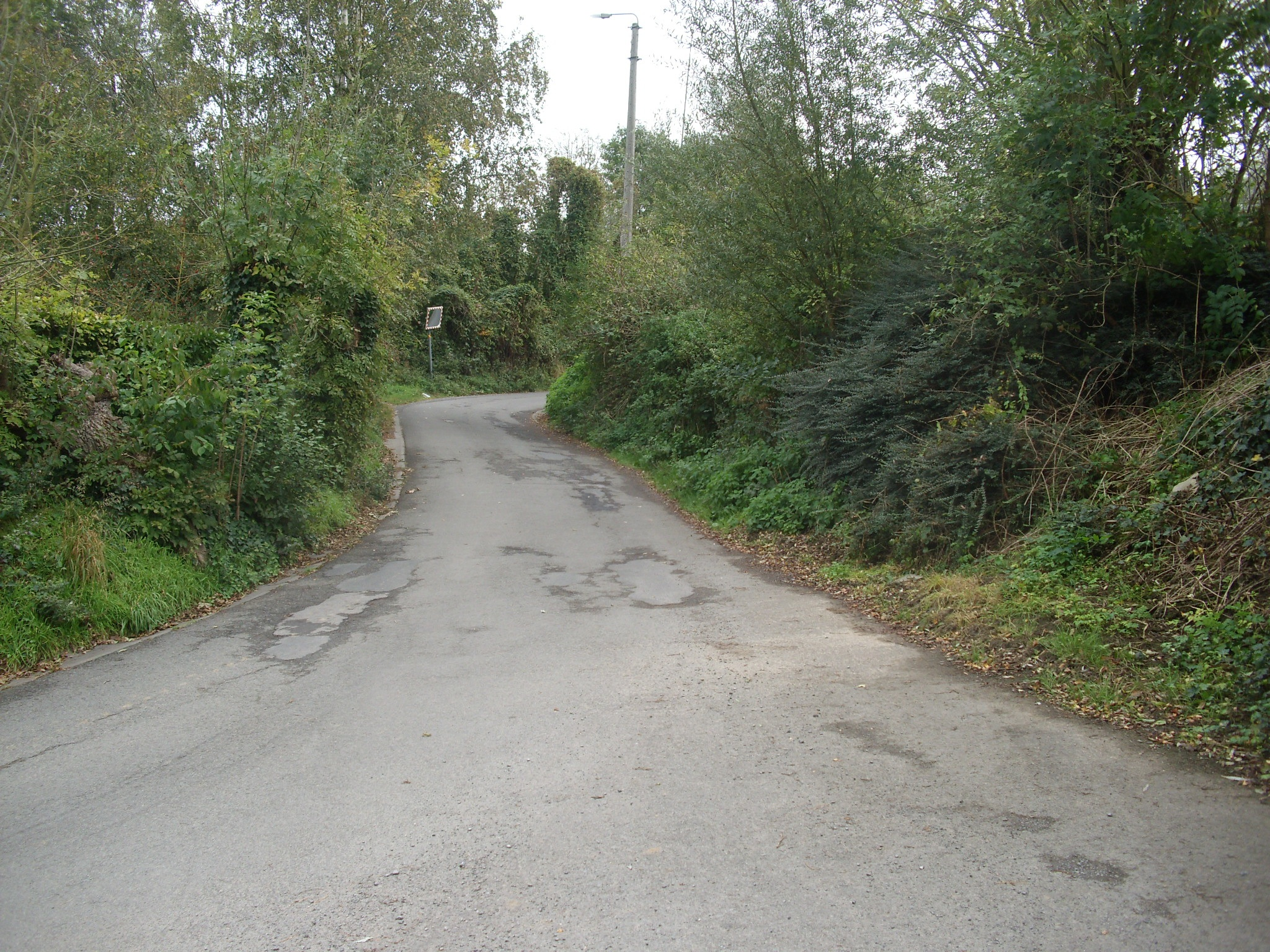
- Kortekeer climb in Maarkedal
- Location: Flanders, Belgium
- Start: Maarkedal
- Gain in altitude: 64 m (210 ft)
- Length of climb: 1.0 km (0.62 mi)
- Maximum elevation: 88 m (289 ft)
- Average gradient: 6.4 %
- Maximum gradient: 17.1 %

Kortekeer is the name of an uphill road in the municipality of Maarkedal, in the Belgian province of East Flanders. With its top at 88 m, it is one of the many hills in the Flemish Ardennes. The road is narrow with steep bankings on either side with an asphalted surface. The steepest point is 17.1%. It was the epicenter of one of the most powerful earthquakes ever measured in Belgium, at 5.5 on the Richter scale in 1938.

== Cycling ==
The hill is best known from road bicycle racing, where it regularly features the Flemish races in spring, most notably the Tour of Flanders. The uphill slopes of the Kortekeer start gently before steadily getting tougher as it winds its way through the woods. The asphalt is fairly smooth, but is usually covered in mud and gravel from the high banks. Despite its central location in the Flemish Ardennes, it is a relatively new climb in cycling races. It was first included in the Tour of Flanders in 1988, as a replacement for the nearby Koppenberg, which was deemed too dangerous for a peloton to climb. It has however never become a fixed site of the race.

The climb is also regularly included in the Three Days of De Panne and E3 Harelbeke.
