= Martina Crv =

Italian child singer (born 2013)

- Born: Martina Cervellin; 2013 (age 12–13); Italy
- Occupation: Singer
- Years active: 2023–present
- Known for: The Voice Kids Italy, Junior Eurovision Song Contest 2025
- Musical career
- Genres: Pop; country
- Instruments: Vocals; guitar; piano
Martina Crv
YouTube information
- Channel: Martina.Crv.Official
- Years active: 2020–present
- Genre: Music
- Subscribers: 1.7 thousand
- Views: ~271,000
- Last updated: 29 April 2026

Martina Cervellin (born 2013), known professionally as Martina Crv, is an Italian child singer. She competed in season two of The Voice Kids Italy, participated in Tour Music Fest and represented San Marino in the Junior Eurovision Song Contest 2025 with the song "Beyond the Stars" and placed ninth.

== Biography ==
=== Early and personal life ===
Cervellin was born in Italy in 2013. She started studying singing and guitar at age six, and later studied piano.

=== 2023-present: The Voice Kids Italy, Junior Eurovision, Acustica and other activities ===
In 2023 Cervellin participated in The Voice Kids Italy, performing "Black Horse and the Cherry Tree" in the blind auditions before eventually being eliminated in the Battles performing "Cambia un uomo".

Cervellin appeared on I Fatti Vostri and won the title of Best European Youth Singer 2024 at the Tour Music Fest with the song "Time After Time". Beppe Vessicchio invited her to his academy for a private training day.

On 8 September 2025 Cervellin was announced as the Sammarinese artist for the Junior Eurovision Song Contest 2025 in Tbilisi, Georgia with the song "Beyond the Stars". The song was released on 4 November 2025.

On 13 December 2025 she placed ninth in the contest with 125 points, earning San Marino its highest placement in the Junior Eurovision Song Contest.

On 26 March 2026 she released her first studio album, Acustica.

== Discography ==
=== Studio albums ===
Title	Details	Ref.
Acustica	Released: 26 March 2026; Format: digital download, streaming	

=== Singles ===
Title	Year	Album or EP	Length	Ref.
"Emozioni" (Lucio Battisti cover)	2025	Acustica	3:20	
"L'isola che nonc'è"	2025	Acustica	3:30	
"Dove Mi Porti Tu"	2025	Non-album singles	3:22	
"Time After Time"	2025	Acustica	3:53	
"Black Horse and the Cherry Tree" (KT Tunstall cover)	2025	Non-album singles	2:49	
"Ad Occhi Aperti"	2025	Non-album singles	3:31	
"Make You Feel My Love"	2025	Acustica	3:07	
"Beyond the Stars - JESC Version"	2025	Beyond the Stars	2:46	
"Beyond the Stars"	2025	Beyond the Stars	2:51	
"Nothing but You"	2026	Non-album singles	3:07	

== Videography ==
=== Music videos ===
==== As lead artist ====
Title	Year	Director(s)	Ref.
"Beyond the Stars"	2025	Eliza G, Karin Amadori, Saintpaul DJ, Valerio Carboni	

== Awards and nominations ==
Awards	Year	Category	Work	Result	Ref.
Tour Music Fest	2024	Best European Youth Singer 2024	Herself and for the song "Time After Time"	Won	

Awards and achievements
Preceded by Idols SM with "Come noi"	San Marino in the Junior Eurovision Song Contest; 2025	Succeeded by Violamarie with "Ruota panoramica"
