= Come noi =

2024 song by Idols SM

Song by Idols SM
- Published: 5 October 2024
- Released: 1 November 2024
- Length: 2:53
- Label: Universal Music Denmark
- Songwriters: Francesco Sancisi; Nicola Della Valle; Paolo Macina

Music video
- "Come noi" on YouTube

Junior Eurovision Song Contest 2024 entry
- Country: San Marino
- Artist: Idols SM
- Language: Italian
- Composers: Francesco Sancisi; Nicola Della Valle; Paolo Macina
- Lyricists: Francesco Sancisi; Nicola Della Valle; Paolo Macina

Finals performance
- Final result: 17th
- Final points: 47

Entry chronology
- ◄ "Mirror" (2015)

Official performance video
- "Come noi" on YouTube

"Come noi" (Italian pronunciation: [ˈkoːme (n)ˈnoi]; transl. "Like us") is a song by Sammarinese child girl group Idols SM. It was written by Francesco Sancisi, Nicola Della Valle, and Paolo Macina, and was released on 1 November 2024 through Universal Music Denmark. The song represented San Marino in the Junior Eurovision Song Contest 2024, where it finished in seventeenth, last, place with 47 points.

== Background and composition ==
"Come noi" was written by Francesco Sancisi, Nicola Della Valle, and Paolo Macina, who are members of the band Miodio. According to Macina, the song is dedicated to friendship. The entry also mentions the K-pop boy band Stray Kids and the social media platform TikTok. In an analysis by Wiwibloggs' Pablo Nava, it is "all about getting lost in the music and painting a modern picture of a teenage fantasy".

== Music video and promotion ==
An accompanying music video for the song was released on 5 October 2024. It was directed by Alessandro Capicchioni, Enea Salicioni, and Luca Zucchi. The video was shot entirely in San Marino, including Borgo Maggiore, Montegiardino, Serravalle, Dogana, Rovereta, and Fiorina. As reported by the Sammarinese broadcaster San Marino RTV (SMRTV), the locations shown in the video were deliberately ordinary and "places where the girls go and could go" "to highlight the naturalness and spontaneity of the band members".

=== Promotion ===
In October 2024, Idols SM performed the song at the restaurant Fabrika 136 in San Marino.

== Junior Eurovision Song Contest ==
=== Internal selection ===
Despite SMRTV originally confirming the country's non-participation on 19 May 2024, it was revealed on 3 September 2024 that San Marino would take part in the Junior Eurovision Song Contest 2024, thus returning after an eight-year absence. On 5 September 2024, this was reaffirmed by SMRTV and the Sammarinese Ministry of Tourism, which was put in charge of the participation in the contest. The broadcaster later announced that it had internally selected the Sammarinese entrant and that they would be revealed at the charity event Sogna ragazzo sogna on 11 September, with the entry to be selected through a "small informal competition" that would happen during the event. The country's act was announced to be Idols SM with "Come noi", which was selected by a "popular jury" over their other song "Poesia".

=== At Junior Eurovision ===
The Junior Eurovision Song Contest 2024 took place at Caja Mágica in Madrid, Spain, on 16 November 2024. San Marino was drawn to perform 13th, following Stay Tuned from the Netherlands and preceding Artem Kotenko from Ukraine.

Idols SM's performance at Junior Eurovision featured a variety of LED graphics, consisting of bright colours and lighting. The band members wore white T-shirts, black leather jackets, grey ripped jeans, and flannel shirts tied around the waist. The choreography for the performance was prepared by Jessica Andreoni.

At the end of the show, San Marino finished in seventeenth, last, place with 47 points.

== Release history ==
Release history and formats for "Come noi"
Country	Date	Format(s)	Label	Ref.
Various	1 November 2024	Digital download; streaming	Universal Music Denmark	
