= Junior Eurovision Song Contest 2024 =

22nd edition of international song competition

- Let's Bloom

Date and venue
- Final: 16 November 2024
- Venue: Caja Mágica; Madrid, Spain

Organisation
- Organiser: European Broadcasting Union (EBU)
- Executive supervisor: Martin Österdahl

Production
- Host broadcaster: Radiotelevisión Española (RTVE)
- Director: Mercè Llorens
- Executive producer: Ana María Bordas
- Artistic director: Marvin Dietmann
- Presenters: Ruth Lorenzo; Marc Clotet; Melani García

Participants
- Number of entries: 17
- Returning countries: Cyprus; San Marino
- Non-returning countries: United Kingdom
- Participation map: Competing countries Countries that participated in the past but not in 2024

Vote
- Voting system: The professional jury of each country awards a set of 12, 10, 8–1 points to 10 songs. Viewers around the world vote for 3 songs, and their votes are distributed proportionally. The votes of the jury and the audience make up 50% of all votes.
- Winning song: Georgia "To My Mom"

The Junior Eurovision Song Contest 2024 was the 22nd edition of the Junior Eurovision Song Contest, held on 16 November 2024 at the Caja Mágica in Madrid, Spain, and presented by Ruth Lorenzo, Marc Clotet, and Melani García. It was organised by the European Broadcasting Union (EBU) and host broadcaster Radiotelevisión Española (RTVE). It was the first time that the contest was held in the country. The contest was also the first since 2015 to be held on a Saturday.

Broadcasters from seventeen countries participated in the contest, with Cyprus and San Marino returning after six- and eight-year absences respectively, while the United Kingdom opted not to participate after doing so the previous year.

The winner was Georgia with the song "To My Mom" by Andria Putkaradze, its fourth win and first since 2016. Portugal won the public vote and finished in second place, its best placing to date. Ukraine finished in third place, its best placing since 2013. France finished in fourth place, the first time it placed outside of the top three in four years. Malta finished in fifth place, its best placing since 2018. San Marino finished last on its return.

== Location ==
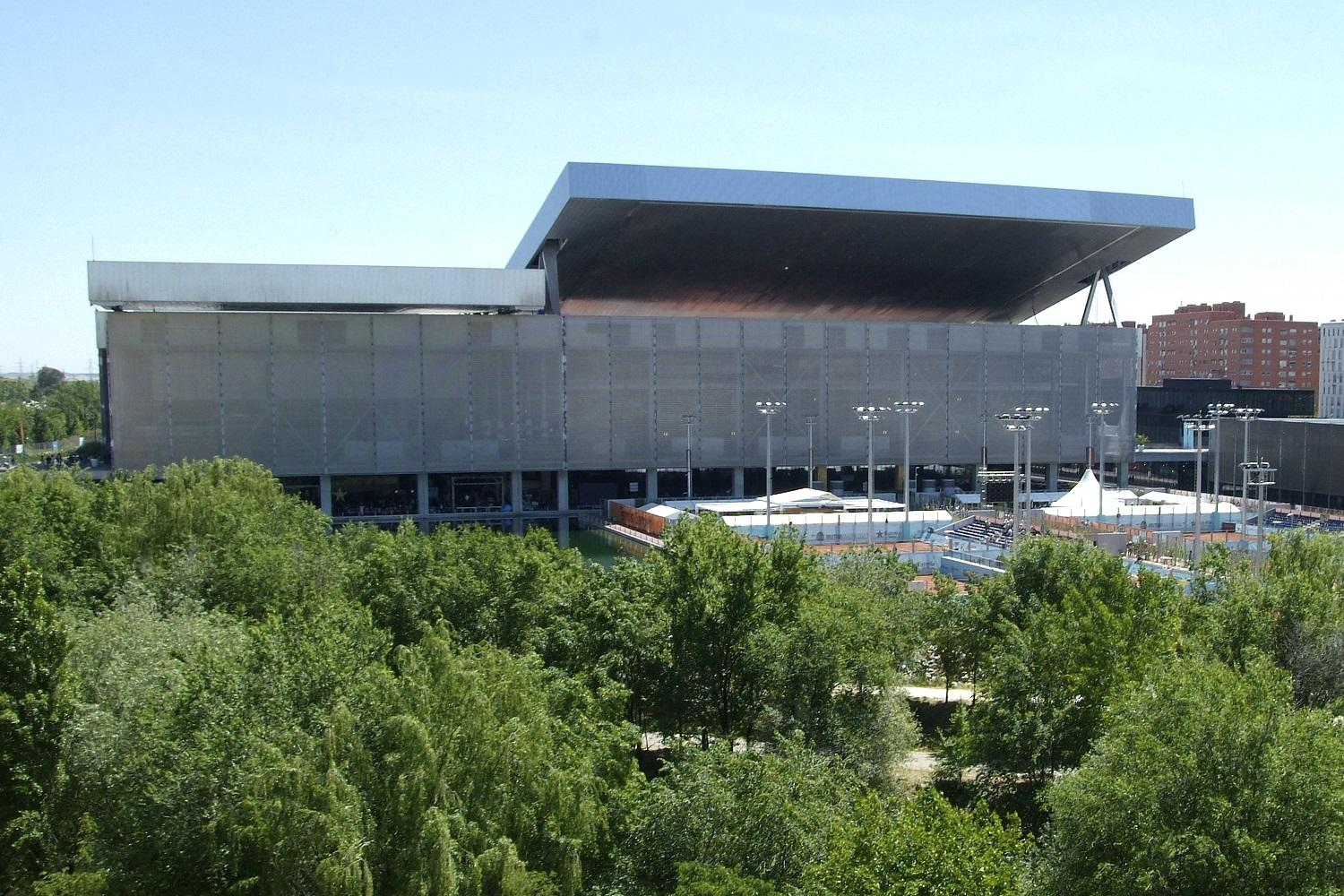
Caja Mágica, host venue of the 2024 contest

Unlike the Eurovision Song Contest, the winning broadcaster of the previous year's Junior Eurovision Song Contest does not automatically receive the right to host the next edition. However, since 2011 (with the exceptions of 2012, 2015, and 2018) it has become customary for winners to take on hosting duties, and since 2019, the winning broadcaster has had the right of first refusal on hosting the following competition. In 2015, 2014 winner, Italian broadcaster Radiotelevisione italiana (RAI), was given this right but ultimately opted out of it.

On 27 November 2023, upon its victory in the 2023 contest on home soil, French broadcaster France Télévisions announced that talks would be conducted with the European Broadcasting Union (EBU) regarding the hosting of the 2024 contest, as multiple countries had expressed interest in doing so and it did not want a "French monopoly on Junior Eurovision", having already hosted the event twice in a three-year span; It ultimately opted not to host in 2024. Spanish broadcaster Radiotelevisión Española (RTVE), which had finished in second place in the 2023 contest, was announced as the host for 2024 on 14 February 2024, with the Caja Mágica in Madrid announced as the venue on 10 May 2024. This marked the first time that the contest has been held in the country.

=== Bidding phase and host city selection ===
Location of host city (in blue), bidding cities (in green), and cities that submitted a bid but later withdrew (in red)

Upon the confirmation of Spain as the host country for 2024, the Generalitat Valenciana announced that it would bid to host the contest in a city in the Valencian Community; since 2022, the autonomous community has hosted Benidorm Fest, the Spanish national final for the Eurovision Song Contest. The mayor of Barcelona, Jaume Collboni, expressed interest in hosting the event in the city, followed by the mayor of Málaga, Francisco de la Torre. Madrid, Granada and Zaragoza also announced their readiness to host the competition. Ana María Bordas, head of the Spanish delegation for the contest, had said that the broadcaster had received several bids upon the host country announcement and that a decision would be taken within the following weeks. Valencia, Barcelona, Málaga, Granada and Zaragoza were reported to have submitted an official bid by mid-March 2024. Shortly after, however, Zaragoza announced its withdrawal due to the unavailability of the intended venue for an assessment visit. In mid-April, Barcelona was unofficially reported to be in the forefront of the selection process, with Palau Sant Jordi considered as the potential venue, but by the end of the month the city dropped out of the running due to the lack of an adequate venue available for late 2024.

RTVE and the EBU scheduled a press conference at Malmömässan in Malmö on 10 May 2024, during the adult contest, where the selected host city was revealed to be Madrid, with Caja Mágica as the selected venue.

== Participants ==
On 3 September 2024, the EBU announced that 17 countries would participate in the 2024 contest. Cyprus returned to the contest after a six-year absence, while San Marino did so after an eight-year absence, despite originally confirming non-participation. Meanwhile, the United Kingdom opted not to participate after doing so the previous two years.

Prior to the contest, a digital compilation album featuring all the songs from the 2024 contest was put together by the European Broadcasting Union and released by Universal Music on 1 November 2024.

Participants of the Junior Eurovision Song Contest 2024
Country	Broadcaster	Artist	Song	Language	Songwriter(s)	Ref.
Albania	RTSH	Nikol Çabeli	"Vallëzoj"	Albanian	Endri Muçaj; Eriona Rushiti	
Armenia	AMPTV	Leo	"Cosmic Friend"	Armenian, English	Arpine Martoyan; David Badalyan; Vahram Petrosyan	
Cyprus	CyBC	Maria Pissarides	"Crystal Waters"	Greek, English	Armin Gilani; Maria Pissarides; Sophia Patsalides	
Estonia	ERR	Annabelle	"Tänavad"	Estonian	Sven Lõhmus	
France	France Télévisions	Titouan	"Comme ci, comme ça"	French	Malory Legardinier; Marie Bastide	
Georgia	GPB	Andria Putkaradze	"To My Mom"	Georgian	Giga Kukhianidze; Maka Davitaia	
Germany	Kika/NDR	Bjarne	"Save the Best for Us"	German, English	Ignacio Uriarte; Kai Oliver Krug; Thomas Meilstrup	
Ireland	TG4	Enya Cox Dempsey	"Le chéile"	Irish	Ian James White; Laoise Ní Nualláin; Nicky Brennan	
Italy	RAI	Simone Grande	"Pigiama party"	Italian, English	Alex Uhlmann; Luca Mattioni; Paolo Meneguzzi	
Malta	PBS	Ramires Sciberras	"Stilla ċkejkna"	Maltese	Aleandro Spiteri Monseigneur; Lon Kirkop; Peter Borg	
Netherlands	AVROTROS	Stay Tuned	"Music"	Dutch, English	Jermain van der Bogt; Willem Laseroms	
North Macedonia	MRT	Ana and Aleksej	"Marathon"	Macedonian, English	Lazar Cvetkoski; Magdalena Cvetkovska	
Poland	TVP	Dominik Arim	"All Together"	Polish, English	Aldona Dąbrowska; Sławomir Sokołowski	
Portugal	RTP	Victoria Nicole	"Esperança"	Portuguese, Spanish	Victoria Nicole	
San Marino	SMRTV	Idols SM	"Come noi"	Italian	Francesco Sancisi; Nicola Della Valle; Paolo Macina	
Spain	RTVE	Chloe DelaRosa	"Como la Lola"	Spanish	Alejandro Martínez; Chloe DelaRosa; David Parejo; Luis Ramiro	
Ukraine	Suspilne	Artem Kotenko	"Hear Me Now"	Ukrainian, English	Svitlana Tarabarova	

== Production and format ==
=== Slogan, visual and stage design ===
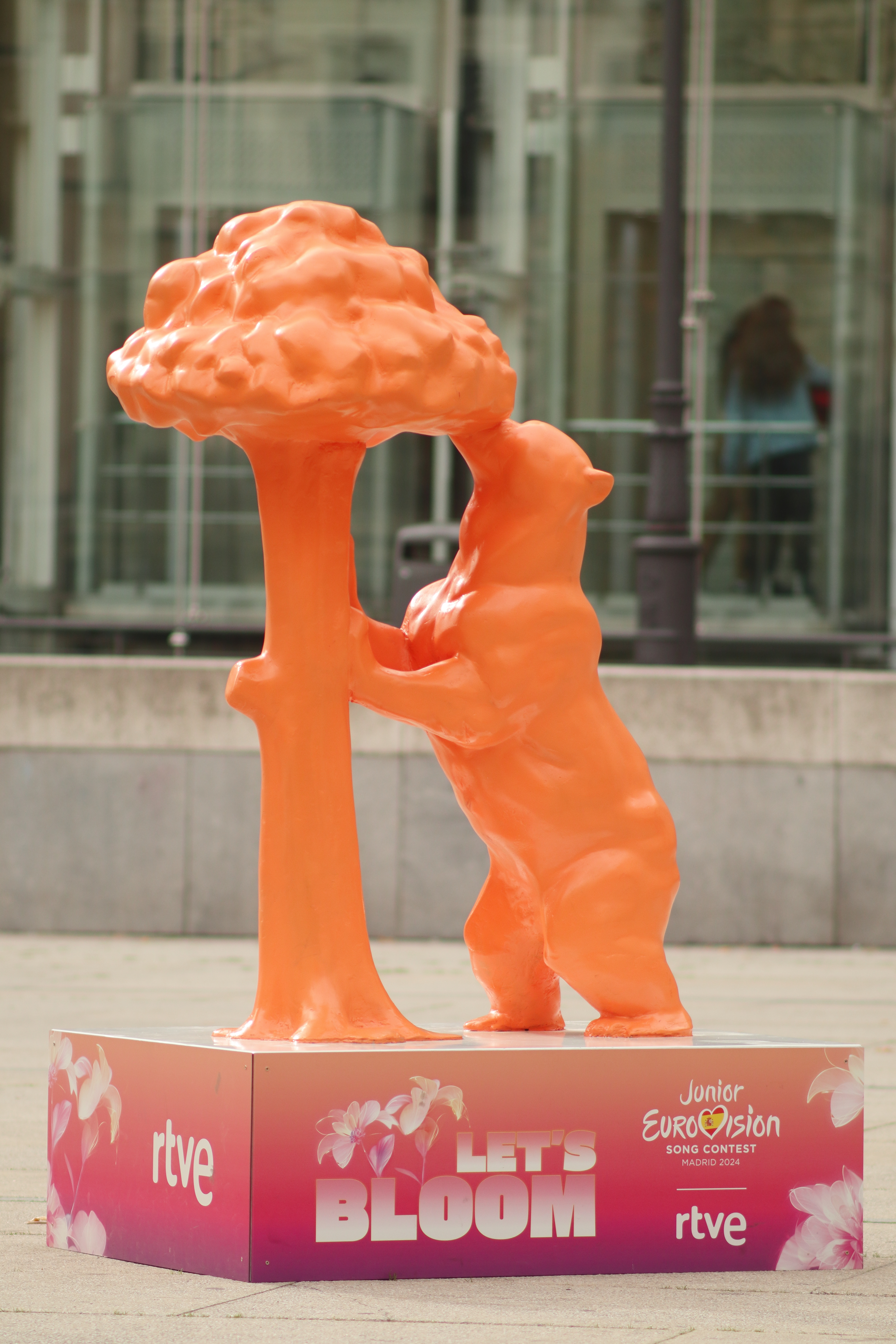
A replica of the Statue of the Bear and the Strawberry Tree in Madrid, featuring the graphic design of the 2024 contest

On 3 September 2024, along with the list of participating countries, RTVE and the EBU revealed the theme art and slogan of the 2024 contest, "Let's Bloom", as well as the stage design. The theme art features the image of a blooming flower, which "references the blossoming of young artists".

=== Presenters ===
Ruth Lorenzo, Marc Clotet and Melani García were revealed on 12 September 2024 as the presenters of the show. Lorenzo had represented Spain in the Eurovision Song Contest 2014 and hosted Benidorm Fest 2024, while García had represented Spain in the Junior Eurovision Song Contest 2019.

=== Postcards ===
Contestants were featured in "postcard" video introductions, in which they perform activities interspersed with artificial intelligence (AI)-generated footage of themselves in various imaginary scenarios.

=== Presentation of the jury votes ===
The presentation of the jury votes was additionally changed for 2024. As opposed to previous years in which the scoreboard was laid out horizontally in descending order, the scoreboard this year was laid out vertically, with each country having its position fixed according to the running order and a score bar to fill out points with. The presenters announced the number of points each country received according to the 1–10 scale; for example, each country is shown the number of countries that have given it 1 point, 2 points, and so forth. The 12 points were still announced by a spokesperson appointed by each country, however, their segments were pre-recorded instead of being a live link. Executive producer Ana María Bordas stated that this was due to the Saturday timeslot forcing the producers to cap the show at two hours, and also in order to avoid causing stress for the participants.

== Contest overview ==
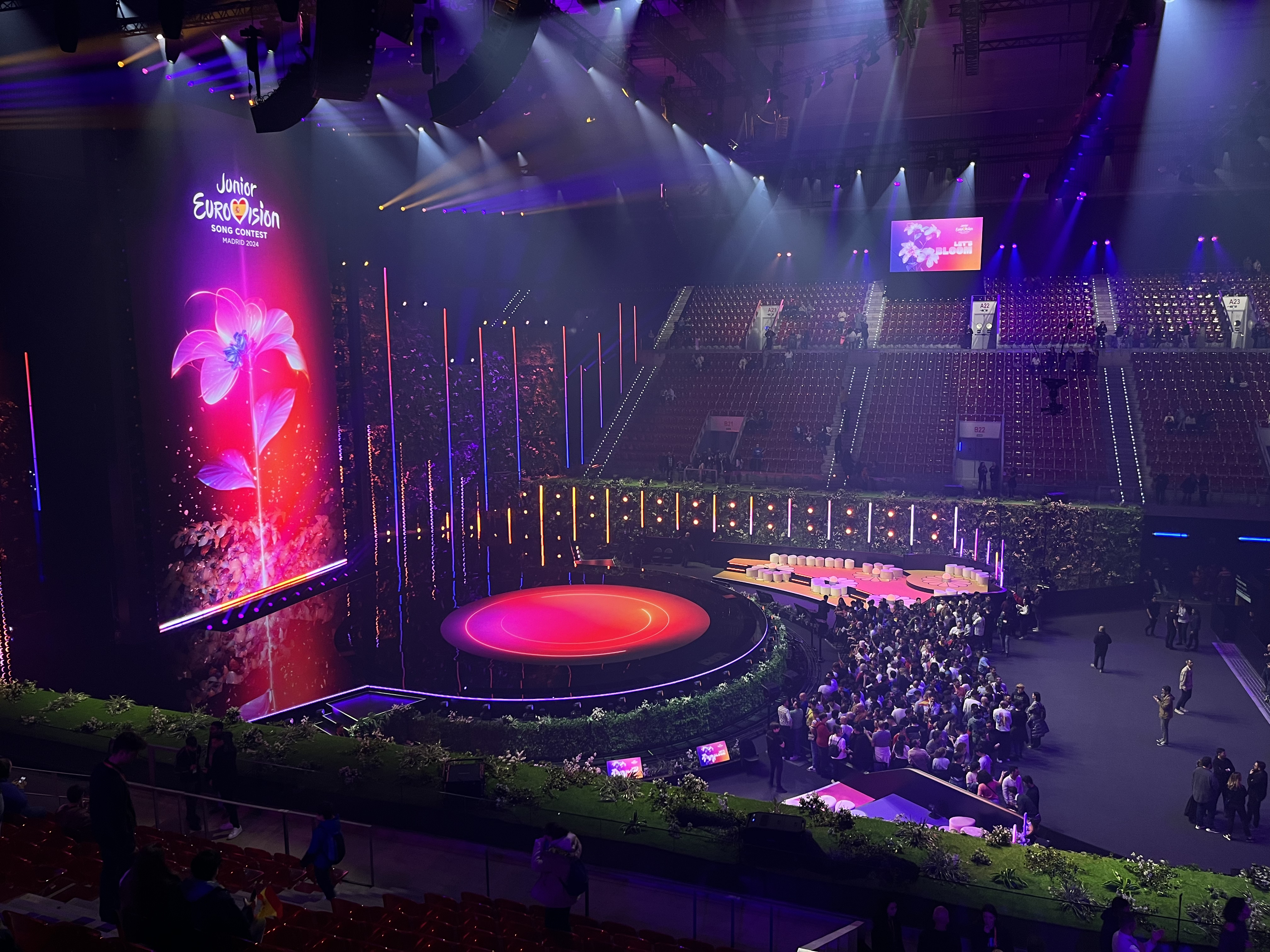
The stage in the arena

The event took place on 16 November 2024 at 18:00 CET. Seventeen countries participated, with the running order published on 10 October. All the countries competing were eligible to vote with the jury vote, as well as participating and non-participating countries under an aggregated international online vote. Georgia won with 239 points, winning the jury vote. Portugal, who won the online vote, came second with 213 points, with Ukraine, France and Malta completing the top five. Cyprus, Estonia, Ireland, North Macedonia and San Marino occupied the bottom five positions.

The opening of the show featured the traditional flag parade, accompanied by all participants performing the common song "Let's Bloom" with 2004 winner María Isabel, 2023 winner Zoé Clauzure and 2023 runner-up Sandra Valero. The interval acts included a dance number titled "Time to Bloom" performed by actress Anastasia Russo and choreographed by Borja Rueda, and Abraham Mateo performing a version of "Maniac" titled "Maníaca".

R/O	Country	Artist	Song	Points	Place
1	Italy	Simone Grande	"Pigiama party"	98	9
2	Estonia	Annabelle	"Tänavad"	55	14
3	Albania	Nikol Çabeli	"Vallëzoj"	126	7
4	Armenia	Leo	"Cosmic Friend"	125	8
5	Cyprus	Maria Pissarides	"Crystal Waters"	60	13
6	France	Titouan	"Comme ci, comme ça"	177	4
7	North Macedonia	Ana and Aleksej	"Marathon"	54	16
8	Poland	Dominik Arim	"All Together"	61	12
9	Georgia	Andria Putkaradze	"To My Mom"	239	1
10	Spain	Chloe DelaRosa	"Como la Lola"	144	6
11	Germany	Bjarne	"Save the Best for Us"	71	11
12	Netherlands	Stay Tuned	"Music"	91	10
13	San Marino	Idols SM	"Come noi"	47	17
14	Ukraine	Artem Kotenko	"Hear Me Now"	203	3
15	Portugal	Victoria Nicole	"Esperança"	213	2
16	Ireland	Enya Cox Dempsey	"Le chéile"	55	15
17	Malta	Ramires Sciberras	"Stilla ċkejkna"	153	5

=== Spokespersons ===
The 12 points from the juries were announced by a spokesperson from each country; known spokespersons are listed below.

- Cyprus – Patroklos Patroklou
- Estonia – Arhanna
- France – Lissandro
- Georgia – Anastasia Vasadze
- Malta – Yulan
- Netherlands – Veronika
- Poland – Maja Krzyżewska
- Portugal – Júlia Machado
- Spain – Carlos Higes
- Ukraine – Anastasiia Dymyd

== Detailed voting results ==
Split results
Place	Combined		Jury		Online vote	
Place	Country	Points	Country	Points	Country	Points
1	Georgia	239	Georgia	180	Portugal	117
2	Portugal	213	Ukraine	122	Ukraine	81
3	Ukraine	203	France	103	Malta	79
4	France	177	Portugal	96	France	74
5	Malta	153	Albania	82	Spain	64
6	Spain	144	Spain	80	Georgia	59
7	Albania	126	Armenia	76	Germany; Netherlands	57
8	Armenia	125	Malta	74	Germany; Netherlands	57
9	Italy	98	Italy	52	Cyprus	50
10	Netherlands	91	Netherlands	34	Armenia	49
11	Germany	71	North Macedonia	20	Poland	48
12	Poland	61	Ireland	15	Italy; San Marino	46
13	Cyprus	60	Germany	14 (Note: Despite receiving the same number of jury points, Germany was determined to finish ahead of Estonia because it received points from more countries.)	Italy; San Marino	46
14	Estonia	55 (Note: Despite receiving the same number of overall points, Estonia was determined to finish ahead of Ireland because it received more points from the online vote.)	Estonia	14	Albania	44
15	Ireland	55	Poland	13	Estonia	41
16	North Macedonia	54	Cyprus	10	Ireland	40
17	San Marino	47	San Marino	1	North Macedonia	34

Detailed voting results of the final
Voting procedure used: 100% Online vote 100% Jury vote		Total score	Online vote score	Jury vote score	Jury vote																
Voting procedure used: 100% Online vote 100% Jury vote		Total score	Online vote score	Jury vote score	Italy	Estonia	Albania	Armenia	Cyprus	France	North Macedonia	Poland	Georgia	Spain	Germany	Netherlands	San Marino	Ukraine	Portugal	Ireland	Malta
Competing countries	Italy	98	46	52		3	6	8	4	1		6		2		4	6	3	2		7
Competing countries	Estonia	55	41	14	2					6			1	1	4						
Competing countries	Albania	126	44	82	6	8		5	7		1	5		6	7	2	3	8	10	8	6
Competing countries	Armenia	125	49	76		10	2		1	12	5	2	12	4		7	2	5	6		8
Competing countries	Cyprus	60	50	10				4			2				1			1		2	
Competing countries	France	177	74	103	7	4	5	10	2		3	7	10	5	8	10	7	6	4	10	5
Competing countries	North Macedonia	54	34	20	5		3	3				4				1	1				3
Competing countries	Poland	61	48	13														2	8	3	
Competing countries	Georgia	239	59	180	12	12	12	12	12	8	10	8		12	10	12	12	12	12	12	12
Competing countries	Spain	144	64	80	4	5	7	1	10	3	6		8		3	5	8	10	3	5	2
Competing countries	Germany	71	57	14		1		2		7		1	2							1	
Competing countries	Netherlands	91	57	34	3		1	7	3		4	3	3				5			4	1
Competing countries	San Marino	47	46	1	1																
Competing countries	Ukraine	203	81	122	10	7	10		8	10	12	12	5	10	2	8	4		7	7	10
Competing countries	Portugal	213	117	96	8	6	8		5	5	7	10	7	8	12	6		4		6	4
Competing countries	Ireland	55	40	15						2			4	3	5				1		
Competing countries	Malta	153	79	74		2	4	6	6	4	8		6	7	6	3	10	7	5		

=== 12 points ===
Below is a summary of all 12 points received from each country's professional juries.

12 points awarded by juries
#	Recipient	Countries giving 12 points
12	Georgia	Albania, Armenia, Cyprus, Estonia, Ireland, Italy, Malta, Netherlands, Portugal, San Marino, Spain, Ukraine
2	Armenia	France, Georgia
2	Ukraine	North Macedonia, Poland
1	Portugal	Germany

=== Online voting ===
According to the EBU 2.3 million votes were cast.

== Broadcasts ==
All participating broadcasters may choose to have on-site or remote commentators providing insight and voting information to their local audience. The European Broadcasting Union also provided international live streams of the contest through their official YouTube channel with no commentary.

Confirmed broadcasters and commentators
Country	Broadcaster	Channel(s)	Commentator(s)	Ref.
Albania	RTSH	RTSH 1, RTSH Muzikë	Andri Xhahu	
Armenia	AMPTV	1TV	Hrachuhi Utmazyan and Sevak Hakobyan	
Cyprus	CyBC	RIK 2, RIK Sat	Kyriakos Pastides	
Estonia	ERR	ETV2	Estonian: Marko Reikop	
Estonia	ERR	ETV+	Russian: Aleksandr Hobotov and Julia Kalenda	
France	France Télévisions	France 2	Stéphane Bern and Valentina	
Germany	ARD/ZDF	Kika	Consi	
Germany	WDR	MausLive via WDR 5	Annika Witzel and Max Plate	
Georgia	GPB	First Channel Sport	Nika Lobiladze	
Ireland	TG4		Louise Cantillon	
Italy	RAI	Rai 2	Mario Acampa, Simone Barlaam and Kaze	
Malta	PBS	TVM	No commentator	
Netherlands	NPO/AVROTROS	NPO Zapp via NPO 3 (Note: Incomplete broadcast of the contest, starting at 18:30 CET during France's performance and pausing at 19:00 (skipping San Marino) before resuming during Ukraine's performance. The Netherlands rebroadcast the full event on NPO Zapp via NPO 3 a day later due to the live broadcast being delayed and interrupted on said channel the night before. The contest was however broadcast live and in full on NPO 2 Extra.)	Bart Arens and Matheu Hinzen	
Netherlands	NPO/AVROTROS	NPO 2 Extra	Bart Arens and Matheu Hinzen	
North Macedonia	MRT	MRT 1	Eli Tanaskovska	
Poland	TVP	TVP2, TVP Polonia	Artur Orzech	
Portugal	RTP	RTP1, RTP África, RTP Internacional	Carina Jorge and Nuno Galopim	
San Marino	SMRTV	San Marino RTV	Mirco Zani and Roberto Bagazzoli	
Spain	RTVE	La 1, TVE Internacional	Spanish: Julia Varela and Tony Aguilar	
Spain	RTVE	Radio Nacional	Spanish: David Asensio and Sara Calvo	
Spain	RTVE	La 1, Ràdio 4	Catalan: Sònia Urbano and Xavi Martínez	
Ukraine	Suspilne	Suspilne Kultura	Timur Miroshnychenko	

Confirmed broadcasters and commentators in non-participating countries
Country	Broadcaster	Channel(s)	Commentator(s)	Ref.
Croatia	HRT	HRT 2	Duško Ćurlić and Nika Turković	
Lithuania	LRT	LRT Plius	Ramūnas Zilnys	
Luxembourg	RTL	RTL Zwee	Eric Lehmann and Raoul Roos	

== Incidents and controversies ==
=== Implementation of AI ===
The implementation of AI in the postcards was heavily criticized by fans and media outlets. In the postcards many artists’ appearance was changed to "meet western standards of fashion". For example, the Irish representative's hair was changed to look blonde in her postcard: and one male artist was first accidentally rendered as a female. Besides the postcards, countries like Poland and Estonia were reported to have used AI in their stagings.

=== Cyberbullying directed at Ukrainian representative ===
The Ukrainian representative, Artem Kotenko was subject to cyberbullying by Russian bots on social media. Svitlana Tarabarova said “We analysed: these are Russian bots, a real attack. This year, we did not remain silent, because our goal is to use this example to protect our children, to raise the topic of cyber security in social networks. We explained to Artem that these comments should not affect him. He — a handsome, talented, incredible boy with a very strong song, who has every chance to become No. 1.“ Tarabarova stated that this was the second year in row that the Ukrainian participant facing cyberbullying with Anastasia Dymyd also facing hate comments. Tarabarova also said that the team could limit Dymyd's screen time but not with Kotenko since he controls his social media accounts.

== See also ==
- Eurovision Song Contest 2024
- Eurovision Young Musicians 2024
