= Svitlana Tarabarova =

Ukrainian singer-songwriter (born 1990)

- Світлана Тарабарова
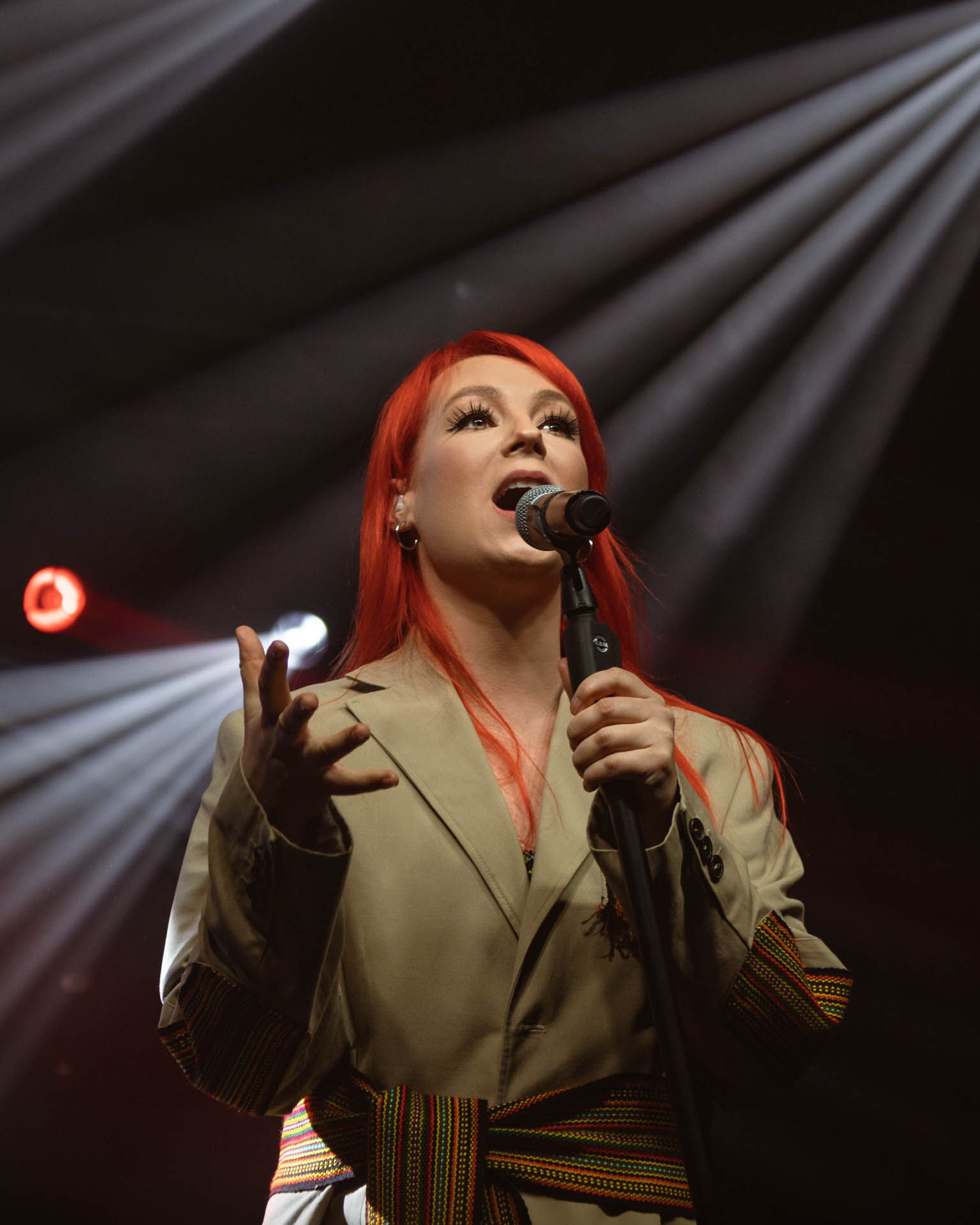
- Tarabarova at the Ukrsongproject 2022 in Gdańsk, Poland
- Born: Svitlana Vasylivna Tarabarova; 26 July 1990 (age 36); Kherson, Ukrainian SSR, Soviet Union
- Occupations: Singer; songwriter; music producer; actress
- Years active: 2008–present
- Spouse: Oleksii Bondar (m. 2016)
- Children: 3
- Musical career
- Genre: Pop
- Instrument: Vocals

Svitlana Vasylivna Tarabarova (Ukrainian: Світлана Василівна Тарабарова; born 26 July 1990) is a Ukrainian singer, songwriter, music producer, and actress.

== Biography ==
Tarabarova was born on 26 July 1990 in Kherson in a large family. Her father worked in a factory and her mother was a kindergarten teacher. As a child she dreamed of becoming a chauffeur and then a singer. She attended music school and various clubs. At the age of 13 she became a member of the dance group "Oasis". After graduating from school, she moved to Kyiv. She graduated from the Kyiv Municipal Academy of Variety and Circus Arts.

She is the winner of the Song of the Year 2014 music award and the Golden Firebird award in the Breakthrough of the Year category. For three years in a row (2017–2019), her songs were chosen as amongst the best songs of the year in the Ukrainian Music Platform Music Award.

On 11 October 2016, Tarabarova married her director Oleksii Bondar. On 9 September 2018 she gave birth to a son Ivan and on 23 September 2020, her daughter Mariia was born.

In 2023, she became the music producer of Natsvidbir na Dytiache Yevrobachennia, the Ukrainian national selection for the Junior Eurovision Song Contest. Since then, she has written four entries that would go on to be selected for the contest: "Kvitka" performed by Anastasiia Dymyd (which placed fifth in 2023), "Hear Me Now" performed by Artem Kotenko (third in 2024), "Motanka" performed by Sofiia Nersesian (second in 2025, the country's best result since 2013), and "Not a Lullaby" performed by Erika Kolesnichenko (9th in 2026).

== Discography ==
=== Studio albums ===
- 2014: Mir vsem (Мир всем)
- 2015: Viriu.Znaiu (Вірю.Знаю)
- 2018: 23:25
- 2023: Dytiachyi albom (Дитячий альбом)
- 2026: Lypen v yii ochakh (Липень в її очах)

=== Extended plays (EPs) ===
- 2016: Naodnytsi (Наодинці)
