= Idols SM =

Sammarinese child girl group

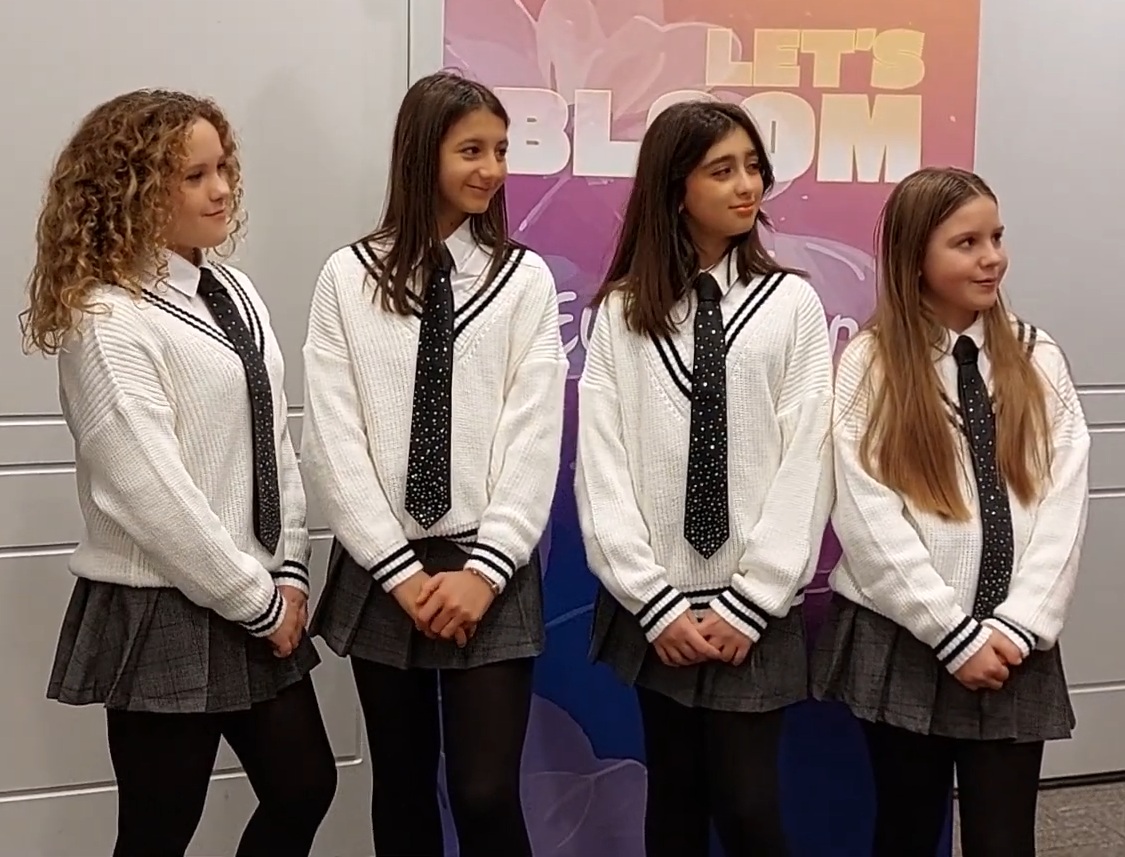
- Idols SM in 2024; From left to right: Vera Stefania Olkhovskaya, Giulia Rinaldi, Asia Ceccoli, Giorgia De Scisciolo

Background information
- Origin: San Marino
- Instrument: Vocals
- Years active: 2024–present
- Members: Asia Ceccoli; Giorgia De Scisciolo; Giulia Rinaldi; Vera Stefania Olkhovskaya

Idols SM is a Sammarinese child girl group formed in 2024, consisting of Asia Ceccoli, Giorgia De Scisciolo, Giulia Rinaldi, and Vera Stefania Olkhovskaya. They represented San Marino in the Junior Eurovision Song Contest 2024 with the song "Come noi".

== History ==
=== 2024: Formation, Junior Eurovision Song Contest, and local activity ===
The band was formed in 2024 after Alessandro Capicchioni, the Sammarinese head of delegation for the Eurovision Song Contest and the Junior Eurovision Song Contest, proposed singers Asia Ceccoli, Giorgia De Scisciolo, Giulia Rinaldi, and Vera Stefania Olkhovskaya to represent the country at the Junior Eurovision Song Contest 2024 in Madrid, Spain, earning the right to be the first participants for the country at the contest since 2015. They were introduced as Idols SM and announced as the Sammarinese entrants at the charity event Sogna ragazzo sogna on 11 September. It was also revealed that the song "Come noi" is the one that the group would perform at the contest, as it was selected by a "popular jury" over their other song, "Poesia", following a "small informal competition" that happened during the event. "Come noi" was officially presented to the public on 5 October and released on 1 November. During an interview with Eurovoix in November 2024, Ceccoli revealed that she came up with the group's name herself, inspired by K-pop and taking the abbreviation of San Marino, SM. On 16 November in the Junior Eurovision live show, Idols SM finished in seventeenth, last, place with 47 points. Immediately after the event, the foursome confirmed that they would continue to work as a group, stating that their goal was "to create new songs".

In November 2024, the band members, except Rinaldi, accompanied by their parents and one of the authors of "Come noi", met with the Minister of Tourism of San Marino, Federico Pedini Amati, who thanked them for representing the country in the contest. Next month, Idols SM were guests at the party of the organisation SUMS Femminile, which helps women in San Marino in difficult situations.

== Musical style and influences ==
The group's musical influence is K-pop boy band Stray Kids.

== Members ==
=== Asia Ceccoli ===
Asia Ceccoli (born 2012 or 2013) is a Russian-Sammarinese child singer. Her father, Andrej Ceccoli (born 4 August 1981), is a Moscow-born entrepreneur, president of the Association San Marino-Russia, and representative of the Party of Socialists and Democrats, who has lived in San Marino since he was 11 and holds both Russian and Sammarinese citizenship. At the age of 8, the artist made her first television appearance as part of the children's entertainment show Generazione Z.

=== Giorgia De Scisciolo ===
Giorgia De Scisciolo (born 2011, 2012 or 2013), also known as Giorgia Descisolo, is a Sammarinese child singer. Her mother, Arianna Pelliccioni, founded the aesthetic centre Glitterful (Glitter Studio) in 2015. As of 2024, the performer's favourite artists were Pinguini Tattici Nucleari.

=== Giulia Rinaldi ===
Giulia Rinaldi (born 29 March 2012) is a Sammarinese child singer. Her father is Roberto Rinaldi.

=== Vera Stefania Olkhovskaya ===
Vera Stefania Olkhovskaya (Russian: Вера Стефания Ольховская; born 18 February 2013), also known by her stage name Vera-Stefania, is a Russian-Sammarinese child singer. She has three siblings. Her mother, Yaroslava Olkhovskaya (Russian: Ярослава Ольховская; born 6 July 1976), who was born in Moscow and graduated from the Moscow University of Political Economy and Law with a degree in psychology, is involved in the development of mutual Russia–San Marino relations in various sectors of the market and production. In May 2019, both Olkhovskys won the international vocal competition In nome della vita sulla terra in Moscow, representing San Marino with their own song "Un nuovo giorno". Later, the young artist appeared in some episodes of the show Generazione Z from 2020 to 2023.

In 2025, Olkhovskaya released her first EP I'm Free, under the name Vera-Stefania.

== Discography ==
=== Singles ===
| Title | Year | Album or EP | Length | Ref. |
|---|---|---|---|---|
| "Come noi" | 2024 | Junior Eurovision Song Contest Madrid 2024 | 2:53 | |

== Videography ==
=== Music videos ===
| Title | Year | Director(s) | Ref. |
|---|---|---|---|
| "Come noi" | 2024 | Alessandro Capicchioni, Enea Salicioni, Luca Zucchi | |

Awards and achievements
| Preceded by Kamilla Ismailova with "Mirror" | San Marino in the Junior Eurovision Song Contest; 2024 | Succeeded by Martina Crv with "Beyond the Stars" |
