= Germany in the Junior Eurovision Song Contest 2024 =

- Junior Eurovision Song Contest 2024
- Participating broadcaster: ARD (Note: Arbeitsgemeinschaft der öffentlich-rechtlichen Rundfunkanstalten der Bundesrepublik Deutschland) – Norddeutscher Rundfunk (NDR) and Kika
- Country: Germany
- Selection process: National final
- Selection date: 1 July 2024

Competing entry
- Song: "Save the Best for Us"
- Artist: Bjarne
- Songwriters: Ignacio Uriarte; Kai Oliver Krug; Thomas Meilstrup

Placement
- Final result: 11th, 71 points

Participation chronology

Germany was represented at the Junior Eurovision Song Contest 2024 with the song "Save the Best for Us", written by Ignacio Uriarte, Kai Oliver Krug, and Thomas Meilstrup, and performed by Bjarne. The German participating broadcasters on behalf of ARD, member Norddeutscher Rundfunk (NDR) and children's television channel Kika, selected their entry through a national final.

== Background ==
Prior to the 2024 contest, Germany had participated in the Junior Eurovision Song Contest three times since its debut in 2020; before their first appearance, Germany was set to take part in 2003 and 2004, but withdrew from both editions before the contest was held. The country entered the competition twice before 2022, when it took a "creative break" due to partial travel warnings for host country Armenia issued by the Federal Foreign Office, however still broadcast the contest on Kika. Germany returned the following year, represented by Fia with the song "Ohne Worte", and ended up in 9th place out of 16 entries with 107 points, marking its first entrance into the top ten and therefore its best result in the contest to date.

Children's television channel Kika, a joint venture of the German national broadcasters ARD and ZDF, broadcasts the event within Germany and organises the selection of the nation's entry in collaboration with the northern German broadcaster NDR, which had also been responsible for organising Germany's participation at the adult contest since 1996.

== Before Junior Eurovision ==
=== National final ===
NDR and Kika confirmed their intention to participate in the 2024 contest on 15 May 2024, also revealing that the selection process for the German entry would follow a similar format to 2023 and not feature a submission process for interested artists, as the organisers instead opted to scout for potential participants behind closed doors.

The German entry for the Junior Eurovision Song Contest 2024 was selected through a national final, as announced on 19 June 2024. The five participants were chosen in collaboration with the production company Bildergarten Entertainment and unveiled on 21 June, along with one-minute excerpts of the demo versions of their songs and presentation videos recorded in Hamburg; a voting platform was launched immediately afterwards where viewers from Germany, as well as neighbouring Austria and Switzerland, could cast their votes until 30 June. The winner was selected by a 50/50 combination of votes from an international jury and the online vote, with the latter taking precedence in the event of a tie, and announced on 1 July 2024.

Artist	Song	Songwriter(s)	Jury	Online vote	Place
Bellamore	"Too Cool"	Debby van Dooren; Simon Tellier	3rd	3rd	3
Bjarne	"Save the Best for Us"	Ignacio Uriarte; Kai Oliver Krug; Thomas Meilstrup	1st	1st	1
Franz	"Komplett"	David Jürgens; Guido von Monrath; Martin Fliegenschmidt; Vincent Matscheko	5th	5th	5
Greta	"All of Me"	Nico Bosslau; Teodora Špirić; Thomas Thurner	4th	4th	4
Julius	"Jupiter"	Debby van Dooren; Simon Tellier	2nd	2nd	2

=== Preparation ===
The full version of "Save the Best for Us" was recorded in late July and early August 2024, and was released in September 2024.

== At Junior Eurovision ==
The Junior Eurovision Song Contest 2024 is set to take place at Caja Mágica in Madrid, Spain on 16 November 2024. Germany will perform 11th, following Spain and preceding the Netherlands.

=== Voting ===
The same voting system that was introduced in the 2017 edition was used, where the results were determined by 50% online voting and 50% jury voting. Every participating broadcaster assembled a national jury that consisted of three music industry professionals and two children aged between 10 and 15 who were citizens of the country they represented. The rankings of those jurors were combined to make an overall top ten.

The online voting consisted of two phases. The first phase of the online voting began on 15 November 2024 when a recap of all the rehearsal performances was shown on the contest's website Junioreurovision.tv before the viewers could vote. After this, voters also had the option to watch longer one-minute clips from each participant's rehearsal. This first round of voting ended on 16 November at 17:59 CET. The second phase of the online voting took place during the live show and began right after the last performance and was open for 15 minutes. International viewers were able to vote for three songs. They were also able to vote for their own country's song. These votes were then turned into points which were determined by the percentage of votes received. For example, if a song received 10% of the votes, it received 10% of the available points.

At the end of the show, Germany received 14 points from juries and 57 points from online voting, placing 11th.

Points awarded to Germany
Score	Country
12 points	
10 points	
8 points	
7 points	France
6 points	
5 points	
4 points	
3 points	
2 points	Armenia; Georgia
1 point	Estonia; Ireland; Poland
Germany received 57 points from the online vote

Points awarded by Germany
Score	Country
12 points	Portugal
10 points	Georgia
8 points	France
7 points	Albania
6 points	Malta
5 points	Ireland
4 points	Estonia
3 points	Spain
2 points	Ukraine
1 point	Cyprus

==== Detailed voting results ====
The following members comprised the German jury:

- Louis Munsch
- Markus Pingel
- Anna Hirschgänger
- Elin Mia Hoffmann
- Jenny Beyer

Detailed voting results from Germany
Draw	Country	Juror A	Juror B	Juror C	Juror D	Juror E	Rank	Points
01	Italy	14	11	10	10	13	15	
02	Estonia	9	14	1	13	8	7	4
03	Albania	1	2	11	14	9	4	7
04	Armenia	12	12	6	4	12	11	
05	Cyprus	15	15	3	8	6	10	1
06	France	4	6	7	2	2	3	8
07	North Macedonia	13	13	8	12	14	16	
08	Poland	8	9	16	6	7	12	
09	Georgia	2	7	9	1	3	2	10
10	Spain	3	4	12	11	16	8	3
11	Germany							
12	Netherlands	11	5	14	9	10	13	
13	San Marino	16	16	5	16	11	14	
14	Ukraine	6	8	15	3	15	9	2
15	Portugal	5	1	2	7	1	1	12
16	Ireland	7	10	4	15	4	6	5
17	Malta	10	3	13	5	5	5	6
