= San Marino in the Eurovision Song Contest 2008 =

- Eurovision Song Contest 2008
- Participating broadcaster: San Marino RTV (SMRTV)
- Country: San Marino
- Selection process: Internal selection
- Announcement date: 11 March 2008

Competing entry
- Song: "Complice"
- Artist: Miodio
- Songwriters: Nicola Della Valle; Francesco Sancisi

Placement
- Semi-final result: Failed to qualify (19th)

Participation chronology

San Marino was represented at the Eurovision Song Contest 2008 with the song "Complice" (Italian pronunciation: [ˈkomplitʃe]; transl. "Accomplice"), composed by Francesco Sancisi, with lyrics by Nicola Della Valle, and performed by the pop-rock band Miodio. The Sammarinese participant broadcaster, San Marino RTV (SMRTV), internally selected its entry for the contest. This was the first-ever entry from San Marino in the Eurovision Song Contest.

SMRTV officially confirmed its debut in the contest in November 2007 after deliberation among its shareholders. Promotion of the entry relied heavily on the internet, with a music video being created and interviews from the band to the press being published in the lead up to the Eurovision Song Contest 2008. San Marino performed fifth in the first semi-final, held on 20 May 2008, and placed last, receiving just five points.

== Background ==
San Marino RTV (SMRTV) announced in mid November 2007 that it was considering entering the Eurovision Song Contest for the first time in its 2008 edition, pending approval from its shareholders. At the time, half of the stock of SMRTV belonged to Radiotelevisione Italiana (RAI), which had last participated for Italy in 1997. Despite this, SMRTV received approval to take part and officially announced its participation in late November 2007. SMRTV Head of Delegation Alessandro Capicchioni stated that their motivation for entering the contest was to promote tourism and to bring attention to the nation, as "a lot of the world knows neither where San Marino is or if it even exists". For its first Eurovision appearance, SMRTV sought to host an internal selection process.

== Before Eurovision ==
=== Internal selection ===
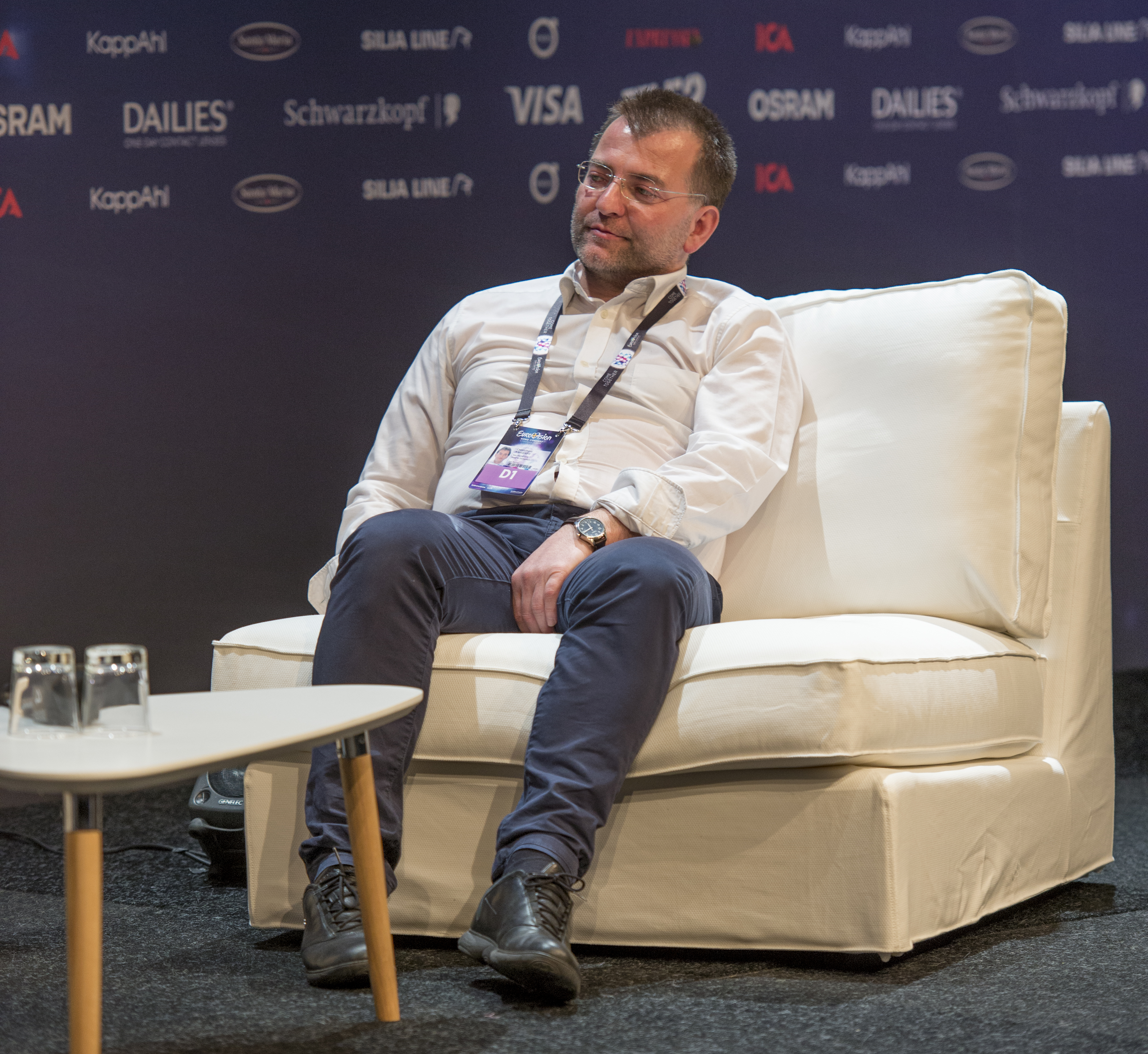
Alessandro Capicchioni served as the Head of Delegation for San Marino and was a member of the selection panel.

SMRTV opened a submission period for interested artists and songwriters to submit their entries for the Eurovision Song Contest 2008 until 25 February. 50 songs were submitted and an expert panel consisting of Little Tony, Vince Tempera, Pasquale Panella, Michele Mangiafico, Michele Bovi, Giuseppe Cesetti, Alessandro and Marco Capicchioni, and Roberto Moretti reviewed the submissions and selected an entry. Alessandro Capicchioni stated they chose an entry that would "bring Italian and Sanmarinese culture to Europe – a melodic song from our tradition". On 11 March 2008, SMRTV announced the song "Complice" performed by Miodio in Italian, as the first Sammarinese entry. Miodio consists of Nicola Della Valle (vocals), Paolo Macina (guitar), Andrea Marco 'Polly' Pollice (bass), Francesco Sancisi (keyboard), and Alessandro Gobbi (drums). The song was written by band members Sancisi and Della Valle. Upon the announcement of their participation, the band stated that they embody "a new way of thinking, born by anger and the will to react [to what] each individual carries in their ego".

Among the submissions received by SMRTV included Italian duo Jalisse (who represented Italy in 1997), Valentina Monetta, Massimo Bertacci, Michele Imberti, as well as those from different Eurovision national selections in other countries, including "If You Never Back" by Elnur Hüseynov and "We Are One" by Alexa from the Azerbaijani and Moldovan national finals, respectively.

=== Promotion ===
To promote the entry, a music video was filmed and released as part of the song's presentation on 15 March 2008. In an interview in March 2008 with ESCToday's Yiorgos Kasapoglou, Miodio stated that they were relying on the internet to get their song and name out. By May, they had performed the song live on television through Radio Television of Serbia and granted interviews to the press in the lead up to the Eurovision Song Contest 2008.

== At Eurovision ==
The Eurovision Song Contest 2008 took place at the Belgrade Arena in Belgrade, Serbia. It consisted of two semi-finals held on 20 and 22 May, respectively, and the final on 24 May 2008. According to the Eurovision rules at the time, all participating countries, except the host nation and the "Big Four", consisting of France, Germany, Spain, and the United Kingdom, were required to qualify from one of the two semi-finals to compete for the final; the top 10 countries from the respective semi-finals would proceed to the final.

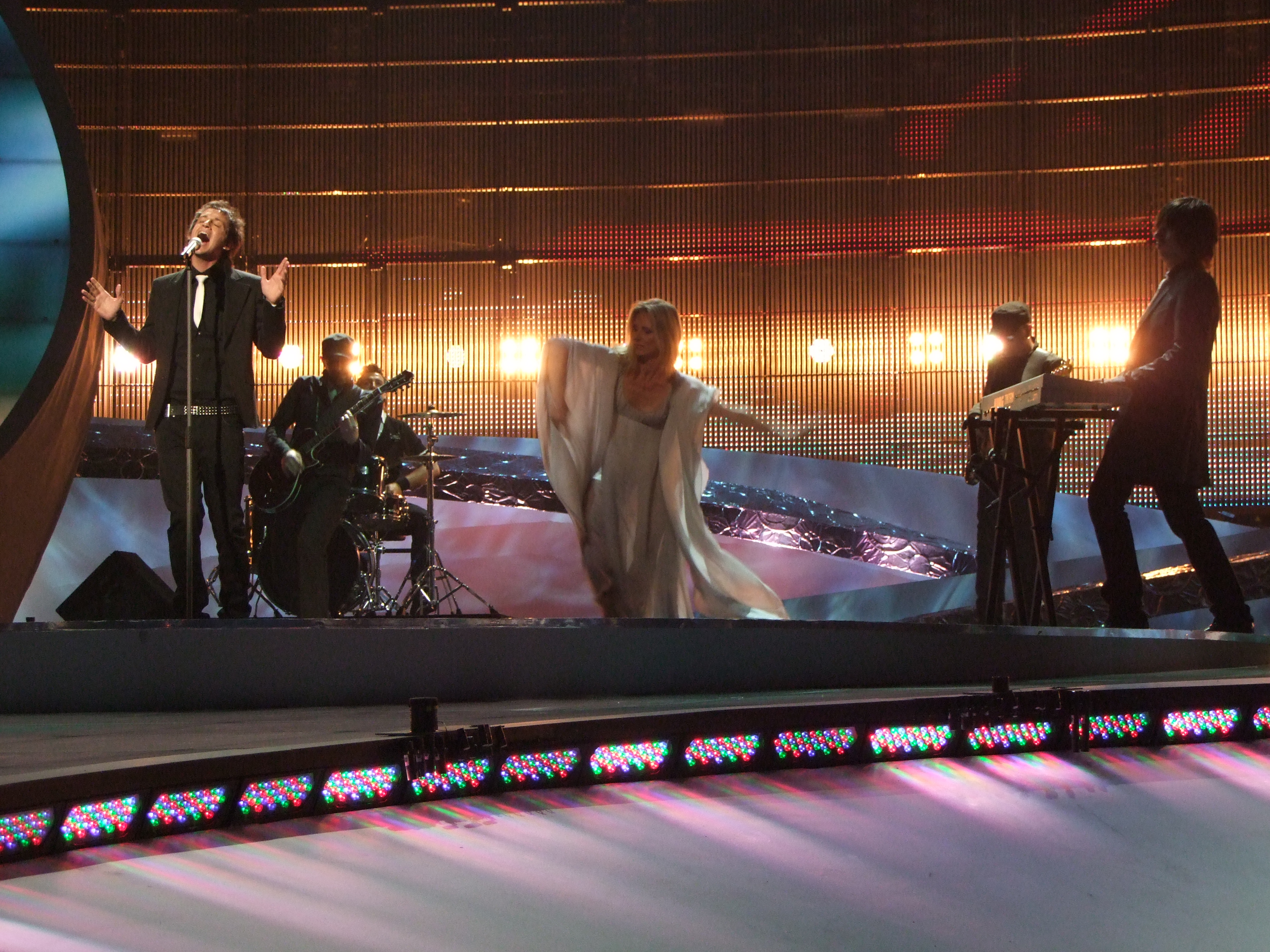
Miodio performing "Complice" in the first semi-final.

On 28 January 2008, an allocation draw was held that placed each country into one of the two semi-finals, with San Marino being placed into the first semi-final. The 2008 contest was the first to feature two semi-finals, a change intended to reduce the problems of neighbourly and diaspora voting that occurred in years past. Countries that normally would vote for each other were placed into separate semi-finals. Once all of the competing songs for the Eurovision Song Contest had been released, the running order for the semi-finals was decided by the delegation heads of the 43 participating countries of the contest rather than through another draw; the nation was assigned position five, following Moldova and preceding Belgium. Though only participating in the first semi-final, SMRTV aired both semi-finals and the final, which in turn allowed parts of Italy within its broadcasting area to watch the contest, despite the country itself not participating. Lia Fiorio and Gigi Restivo served as commentators for the television broadcasts, which were also streamed online, while Emilia Romagna provided commentary for Radio San Marino.

Miodio performed in the first semi-final on 20 May 2008, appearing fifth out of the 19 countries. The performance featured the band wearing black suits, but with each member wearing it in a different style. Aniko Pusztai, set designer and dancer at La Scala in Milan, joined the group on stage. SMRTV stated that they believed that choreography was as important as the song itself, deciding to use what they referred to as emotional impact for the performance. The broadcaster said that Pusztai would move on the words of the text, merging the music with dance, a sort of angel, a white that will contrast with the dark soul of Miodio. The background on the large television screens on stage was a wavy light blue colour.

=== Voting ===
Below is a breakdown of points awarded to San Marino in the first semi-final of the Eurovision Song Contest 2008, as well as by the country in the semi-final and final. Miodio's performance did not manage to inspire the crowd and San Marino only managed to receive five points with its debut entry: two points from Andorra and three points from Greece, placing the nation last of the 19 entries and not qualifying for the final. SMRTV appointed Moretti as its spokesperson to announce the votes given by the Sammarinese jury.

==== Points awarded to San Marino ====
Points awarded to San Marino (Semi-final 1)
Score	Country
12 points	
10 points	
8 points	
7 points	
6 points	
5 points	
4 points	
3 points	Greece
2 points	Andorra
1 point	

==== Points awarded by San Marino ====
Points awarded by San Marino (Semi-final 1)
Score	Country
12 points	Greece
10 points	Poland
8 points	Armenia
7 points	Norway
6 points	Romania
5 points	Moldova
4 points	Finland
3 points	Netherlands
2 points	Israel
1 point	Montenegro

Points awarded by San Marino (Final)
Score	Country
12 points	Greece
10 points	Israel
8 points	Armenia
7 points	Norway
6 points	United Kingdom
5 points	Portugal
4 points	Turkey
3 points	Albania
2 points	Denmark
1 point	Romania
