= San Marino in the Junior Eurovision Song Contest =

- Junior Eurovision Song Contest
- Participating broadcaster: San Marino RTV (SMRTV)

Participation summary
- Appearances: 6
- First appearance: 2013
- Highest placement: 4th: 2026
- Participation history: 2013; 2014; 2015; 2016 – 2023; 2024; 2025; 2026
- For the most recent participation see San Marino in the Junior Eurovision Song Contest 2026

San Marino has been represented at the Junior Eurovision Song Contest 6 times since its debut in the 2013 contest. The Sammarinese participating broadcaster in the contest is Radiotelevisione della Repubblica di San Marino (SMRTV). It consecutively participated between 2013 and 2015. Following a nine-year absence after the 2015 contest, SMRTV returned to the contest in 2024. In 2026, San Marino placed fourth out of sixteen entries, which is the country's highest placing in any Eurovision event.

== History ==
Radiotelevisione della Repubblica di San Marino (SMRTV) is a full member of the European Broadcasting Union (EBU), thus eligible to participate in the Junior Eurovision Song Contest.

SMRTV attempted to participate in the contest in 2011 in Yerevan, Armenia. However, the broadcaster withdrew after appearing on the official list of participants, citing a failure to find a suitable entrant. On 25 October 2013, SMRTV confirmed that it would make its debut in the contest in 2013 in Kyiv, Ukraine. For its first appearance, SMRTV internally selected Michele Perniola to represent the country with "O-o-O Sole intorno a me", marking the first time since 2004 that the Italian language was on the stage of the Junior Eurovision Song Contest. Ultimately, Perniola finished in tenth position in a field of twelve countries, marking San Marino's first top ten result in a Eurovision event. SMRTV continued the internal selection process for the 2014 contest in Marsa, despite an initial delay in confirming participation. On 26 September 2014, it was revealed that the Italian/Sammarinese girl band The Peppermints, would represent San Marino with the song "Breaking My Heart". The group finished in fifteenth position in a field of sixteen with 21 points. On 27 September 2015, SMRTV announced their third attempt for the 2015 contest in Sofia, Bulgaria. Initially, the broadcaster announced that it would organise a national selection entitled Vocine Nuove Castrocaro. Ultimately, the selection was held privately and Kamilla Ismailova was selected to perform the song "Mirror". Ismailova placed fourteenth in a field of seventeen entries with a total of 36 points, also placing ninth in the public televote. At the time, this marked San Marino's highest relative placing in a Eurovision event. On 8 June 2016, SMRTV's head of delegation for the contest, Alessandro Capicchioni, welcomed the move of the junior event to a Sunday afternoon and revealed that the broadcaster would select a foreign representative for the 2016 contest should the country participate. However, on 14 July 2016, SMRTV announced it would withdraw from the 2016 contest alongside Slovenia and Montenegro, with no reasons cited for the move. San Marino remained absent for a further eight editions of the contest.

Despite initially confirming that the country would not return in 2024, on 3 September 2024, San Marino appeared on the list of participating countries for the 2024 contest in Madrid, Spain. Idols SM were internally selected to represent the country, and were announced as the selected group on 11 September 2024 during the charity event Sogna ragazzo sogna, broadcast on San Marino RTV. "Come noi" was officially released as San Marino's entry on 5 October 2024. The group placed last in a field of seventeen, scoring 47 points. On 29 November 2024, SMRTV confirmed its participation in the 2025 contest. Martina Crv was internally selected by SMRTV to represent San Marino in Tbilisi with "Beyond the Stars", which went on to place ninth in a field of eighteen entries with 125 points, placing third place in the online vote, marking the country's highest placing at the time.

Following the 2025 contest, on 22 December 2025, SMRTV confirmed that it would submit a bid to host the Junior Eurovision Song Contest 2026, however the bid was not successful. On 8 September 2026, SMRTV officially announced that Violamarie as the Sammarinese representative for the 2026 contest. The selected song, "Ruota panoramica" was released on 25 September 2026, with the official music video being published 14 October. Performing in position 5, San Marino ultimately placed fourth in a field of sixteen, marking the country's best result to date. The entry placed second with the online vote and eighth with the jury vote.

== Participation overview ==
Table key
◁	Last place
†	Upcoming event

Year	Artist	Song	Language	Place	Points
2013	Michele Perniola	"O-o-O Sole intorno a me"	Italian	10	42
2014	The Peppermints	"Breaking My Heart"	Italian, English	15	21
2015	Kamilla Ismailova	"Mirror"	Italian, English	14	36
2024	Idols SM	"Come noi"	Italian	17 ◁	47
2025	Martina Crv	"Beyond the Stars"	Italian, English	9	125
2026	Violamarie	"Ruota panoramica"	Italian, English	4	148
2027	Confirmed intention to participate †				

== Related involvement ==
=== Heads of delegation ===
Year	Head of delegation	Ref.
2013–2024	Alessandro Capicchioni	
2025	Denny Montesi	

=== Commentators and spokespersons ===
SMRTV sends their own commentator to each contest in order to provide commentary in the Italian language. Spokespersons have also chosen by the national broadcaster in order to announce the awarding points from San Marino. The table below lists the details of each commentator and spokesperson since the country's debut in 2013.

Year(s)	Channel	Commentator	Spokesperson	Ref.
2013	San Marino RTV	Lia Fiorio and Gilberto Gattei	Giovanni	
2014	San Marino RTV	Lia Fiorio and Gilberto Gattei	Clara	
2015	San Marino RTV	Lia Fiorio and Gilberto Gattei	Arianna Ulivi	
2016–2023	No broadcast		Did not participate	N/A
2024	San Marino RTV	Mirco Zani and Roberto Bagazzoli	Unknown	
2025	San Marino RTV	Anna Gaspari and Mirco Zani	Asia Ceccoli	
2026	San Marino RTV	Irol and Catia Demonte	Liam	

=== Photo gallery ===
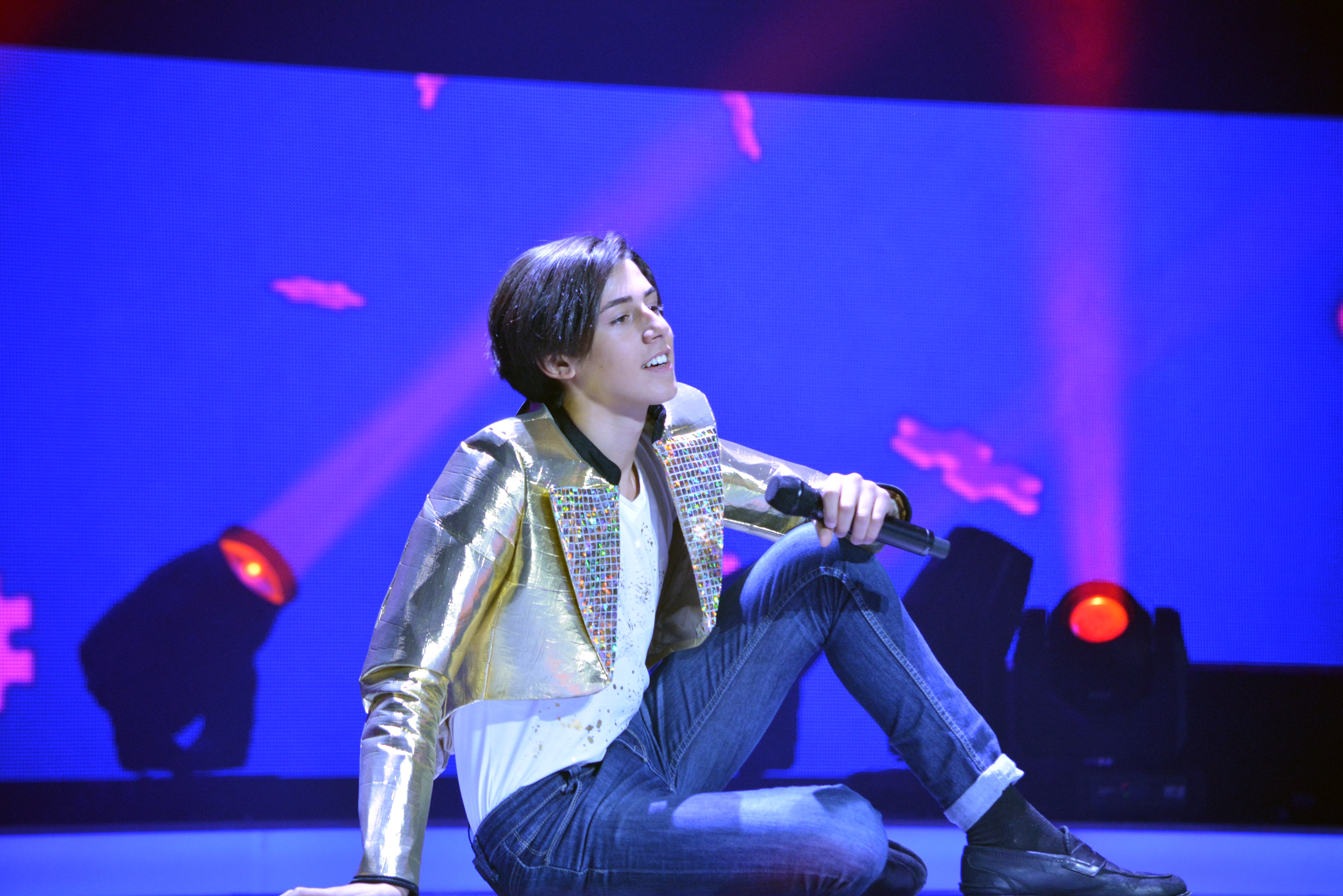
Michele Perniola in Kyiv (2013)

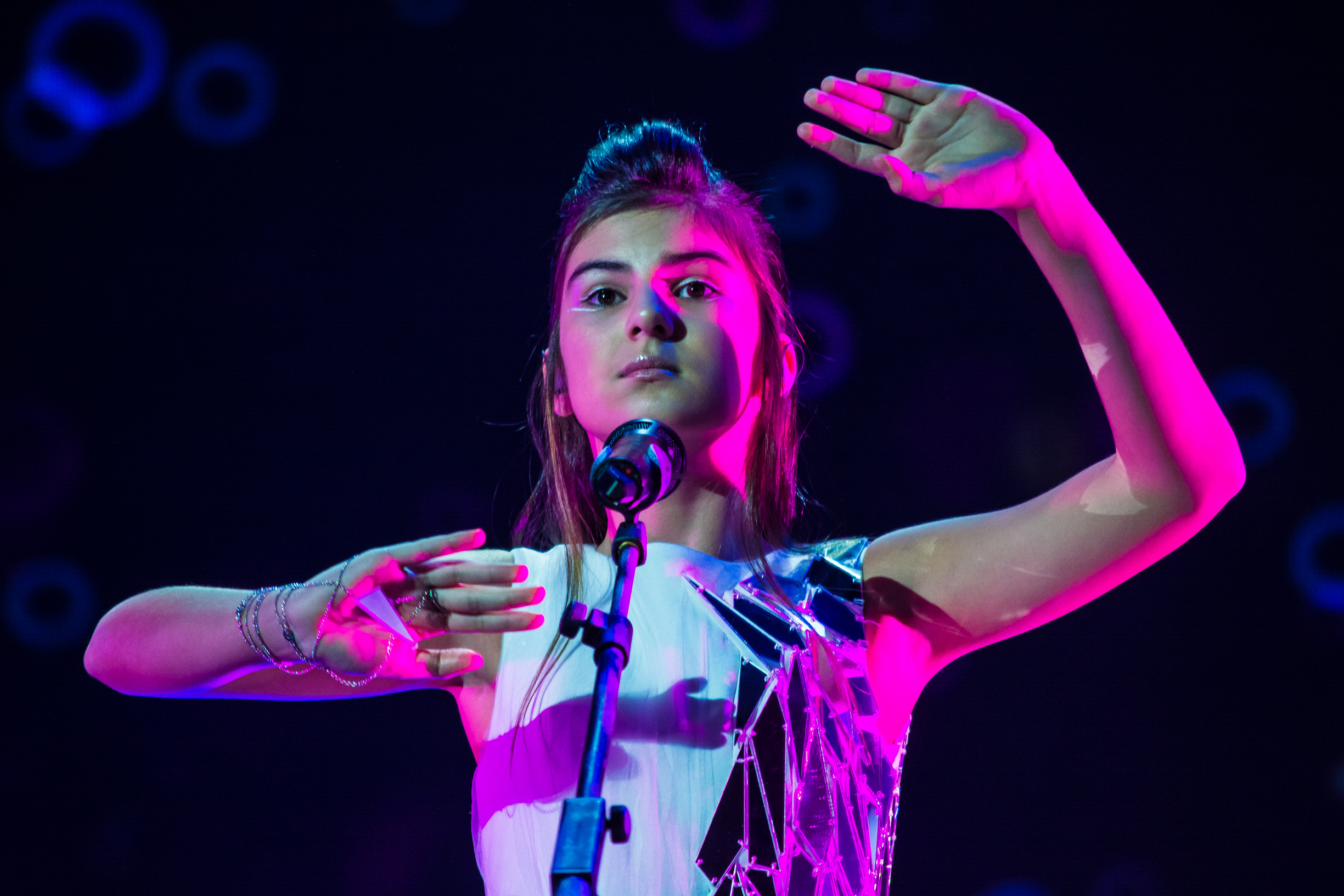
Kamilla Ismailova in Sofia (2015)

== See also ==
- San Marino in the Eurovision Song Contest
