= Artem Kotenko =

Ukrainian singer (born 2012)

Artem Kotenko Артем Котенко
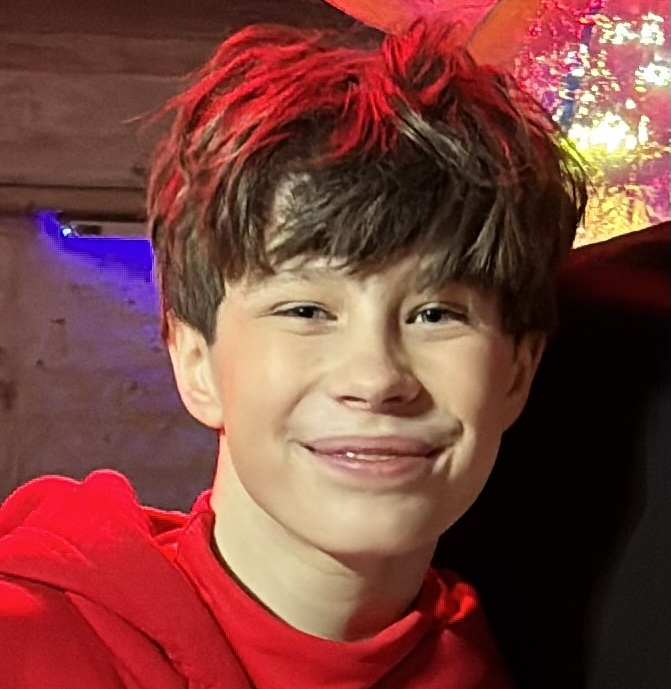
- Kotenko in 2026

Background information
- Born: Artem Vitaliyovych Kotenko; 12 January 2012 (age 14); Okhtyrka, Sumy Oblast, Ukraine
- Genre: Pop
- Occupation: Singer
- Instrument: Vocals
- Years active: 2015–present
- Label: TAVR Records

Artem Vitaliiovych Kotenko (Ukrainian: Артем Віталійович Котенко; born 12 January 2012) is a Ukrainian child singer. He represented Ukraine in the Junior Eurovision Song Contest 2024 with the song "Hear Me Now", finishing 3rd overall with 203 points.

== Early life ==
Kotenko was born on 12 January 2012 in Okhtyrka, Sumy Oblast, Ukraine.

In addition to his vocal career, Kotenko studies choreography, theatre arts, and piano. He also has experience hosting municipal events.

== Career ==
=== Early career: Black Sea Games 2021 and United Kids Festival 2022 ===
Kotenko began singing in early childhood. By the age of three, he had joined the vocal ensemble Kroshky, and from the age of five he began professional vocal training. His vocal teacher was Larysa Anatoliivna Kroshka, the head of the ensemble.

In August 2020, Kotenko was included in the 4th edition of the children's talent encyclopedia Vydatni dity Ukrainy (transl. Outstanding Children of Ukraine), which was presented on 29 August in Kyiv. The encyclopedia featured children from various regions of the country recognized for their achievements. That same year, Kotenko won the international project "Razom iz zirkamy" (transl. "Together with the Stars") as part of the Spivaiu z Ruslanoiu (transl. Singing with Ruslana) festival. Following the project, Kotenko was selected by Ruslana Lyzhychko's team to participate in the music video for the song "Balada pro pryntsesu" (transl. "Ballad About a Princess"), performed jointly by Ruslana and the festival winners to mark the 25th anniversary of the song's release. The music video was released in January 2022.

In 2021, he won first place at the 18th All-Ukrainian Charity Children's Festival Chornomorski Ihry (transl. Black Sea Games) in the category "Junior Group, Vocalists aged 6–11". The festival took place from 20 to 22 August 2021 in Skadovsk, Kherson Oblast.

In 2022, Kotenko received the Grand Prix at the international children's vocal festival United Kids Festival in Poland. The festival brought together about 50 participants from Ukraine, Poland, Germany, and Kazakhstan. Kotenko competed in the 10–12 age category, where he reached the final and won the competition's main award.

=== 2023–2024: Junior Eurovision 2023 and 2024 ===
After the National Public Broadcasting Company of Ukraine (Suspilne) announced Ukraine's participation in the Junior Eurovision Song Contest 2023 on 17 June 2023, Kotenko submitted his application and was one of 143 candidates. On 13 July, Suspilne published the longlist of the national selection featuring 10 participants, including Kotenko. However, he did not make it to the list of 5 finalists. During the Junior Eurovision Song Contest 2023, Kotenko served on the national jury of Ukraine as one of two child members appointed by the broadcaster.

On 2 September 2024, Kotenko became one of the winners of the charity competition for children Dity.Help Music 2024 in the category "Vocalists, 11–13 years old".

On 24 July 2024, Suspilne announced the national selection for the Junior Eurovision Song Contest 2024 and the list of 15 artists who made the longlist, which included 12-year-old Kotenko. On 1 September, 10 artists were selected from the 15 for the shortlist. On 8 September, it was announced that Kotenko had reached the top six finalists of the national selection. The finalists' songs were first presented on 15 September as part of the musical reality show Shchodennyky Dytiachoho Yevrobachennia (transl. Junior Eurovision Diaries), including Kotenko's song "Dim" (transl. "Home"). The final of the national selection took place on 22 September 2024. Kotenko scored 11 points, tying with Zlata Ivaniv, but was declared the winner due to receiving a higher score from the public vote. Although Kotenko's song was titled "Dim" during the national selection, on 6 October, its title was changed to "Hear Me Now" in order "to make it more understandable for Europe". The lyrics, written by Svitlana Tarabarova specifically for the contest, feature both Ukrainian and English. The song presents the concept of home as a symbol of safety, support, strength, and warmth, emphasizing its significance for Ukrainians who were forced to leave their homes or lost them due to the war.

Following the announcement of Kotenko as Ukraine's representative for the Junior Eurovision Song Contest 2024, he became the target of online harassment by Russian bots spreading negative and derogatory comments on social media, similar to attacks directed at the Ukrainian representative the previous year.

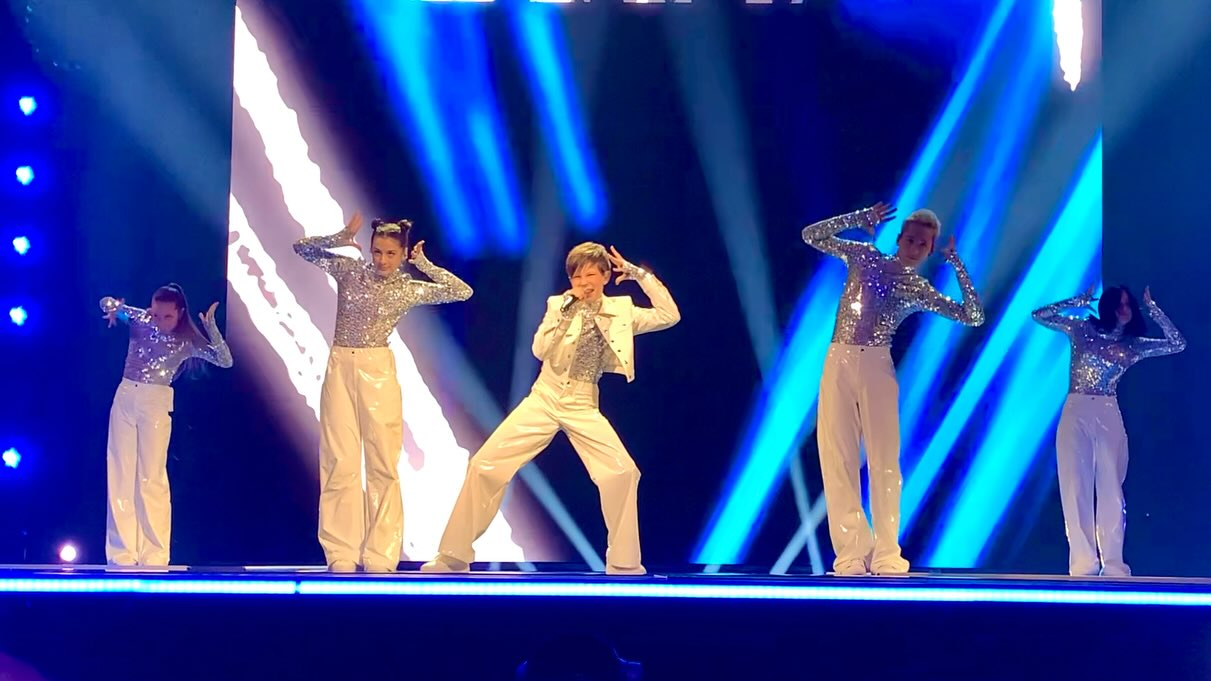
Kotenko performing on stage of the Junior Eurovision 2024 during the Jury Show

At the Junior Eurovision Song Contest 2024, held in Madrid on 16 November 2024, Kotenko performed 14th, following San Marino and preceding Portugal. The performance was staged by Danylo Diemiekhin, who was responsible for the direction and artistic design of the act. At the Junior Eurovision Song Contest 2024, Kotenko placed second in both the public and jury votes, resulting in a total of 203 points and a 3rd place finish overall, marking Ukraine's best result in the contest in 11 years.

On 27 December 2024, a music video by Vlad Darwin for the Ukrainian version of the song "Try sestry" (transl. "Three Sisters") was released, featuring Kotenko.

=== 2025–present: REPEAT album and Mamyne Namysto musical ===
On 8 February 2025, during the national selection for the Eurovision Song Contest 2025, Kotenko performed as part of the interval act together with Svitlana Tarabarova. They performed the song "Hear Me Now" in a special version that focused on the theme of Ukrainian children illegally deported to Russia during the Russian invasion of Ukraine.

On 14 March 2025, Kotenko participated in the annual Big Spring Concert organized by the Hit FM radio station, held at the October Palace in Kyiv.

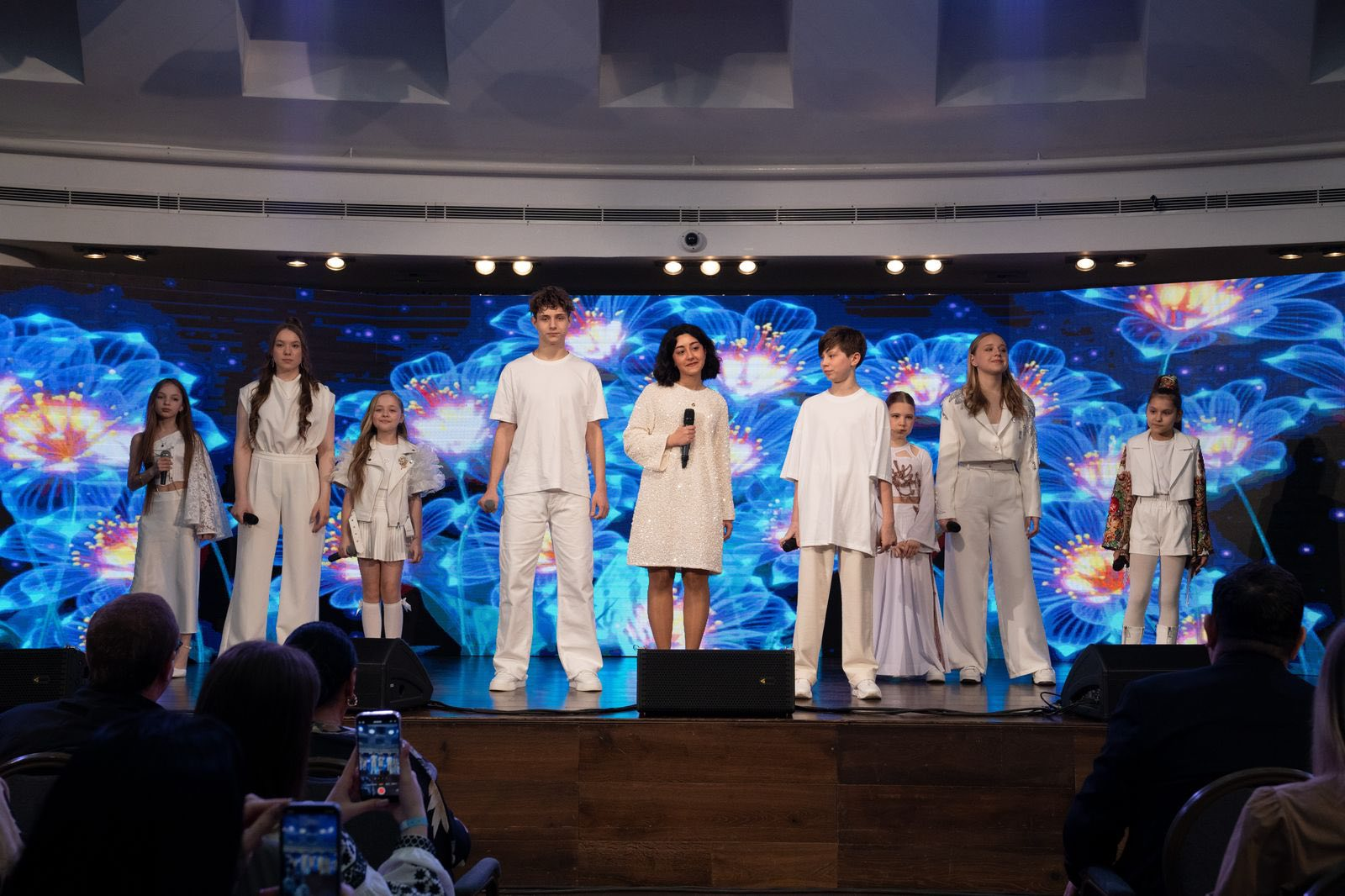
Kotenko together with other Ukrainian performers during the charity concert "For children for future. Ukraine – Azerbaijan"

On 19 April 2025, Kotenko took part in the charity art event "For children for future. Ukraine – Azerbaijan", organized by the Embassy of Ukraine in Azerbaijan as part of the People of the Future project. The event took place in Baku and aimed to support Ukrainian children affected by the war and undergoing rehabilitation in Azerbaijan.

On 12 May 2025, a private presentation of Kotenko's debut music video for the song "Filtry" took place at the Sapience Music Bar in Kyiv. During the event, it was also announced that his debut album would be released on 18 July of the same year, along with his upcoming performance at the Atlas Festival 2025.

On 12 July 2025, Kotenko opened the Golden Union Cup charity children's football tournament by performing the song "Golden Union", written specifically for the sporting event as its official anthem. The track was created by Yurii Hlushko and Vlad Sotnikov and recorded at Andrii Tymoshchyk's studio. The song premiered at the tournament opening on 12 July and was released on streaming platforms on 1 September 2025. Subsequently, Kotenko performed "Golden Union" during the tournament's second stage, held from late August to mid-September.

On 18 July of the same year, Kotenko released his debut studio album Repeat, which included both new songs and previously released singles. On the same day, he also performed at the Atlas Festival 2025 on the first day of the festival on the Blockbuster Mall Stage, alongside other participants and winners of the national selections for the Junior Eurovision Song Contest, where he performed "Hear Me Now" and presented the album. Kotenko became the youngest artist in the history of the festival to perform on its main stage.

In 2025, Kotenko also appeared as a guest performer at the second Dity.Help Music charity competition, the final of which took place on 15–16 August in Kyiv. As part of the concert program, he performed his own songs and performed with the 2024 contest winners.

On 12 October 2025, during the national selection for the Junior Eurovision Song Contest 2025, Kotenko opened the show with the song "Hear Me Now". On 13 December 2025, he served as Ukraine's spokesperson at the Junior Eurovision Song Contest 2025 in Tbilisi, announcing the results of the national jury of Ukraine, which awarded its maximum 12 points to Armenia.

In November 2025, it was announced that Kotenko would take part in the concert tour of Svitlana Tarabarova's music project Mamyne Namysto (transl. Mother's Necklace). Alongside Zlata Ivaniv, he was announced as one of the main characters of the program, which was presented as a musical and ran from January to May in several Ukrainian cities. In July 2026, a continuation of the tour was announced, which will run from October to November and cover new cities in Ukraine.

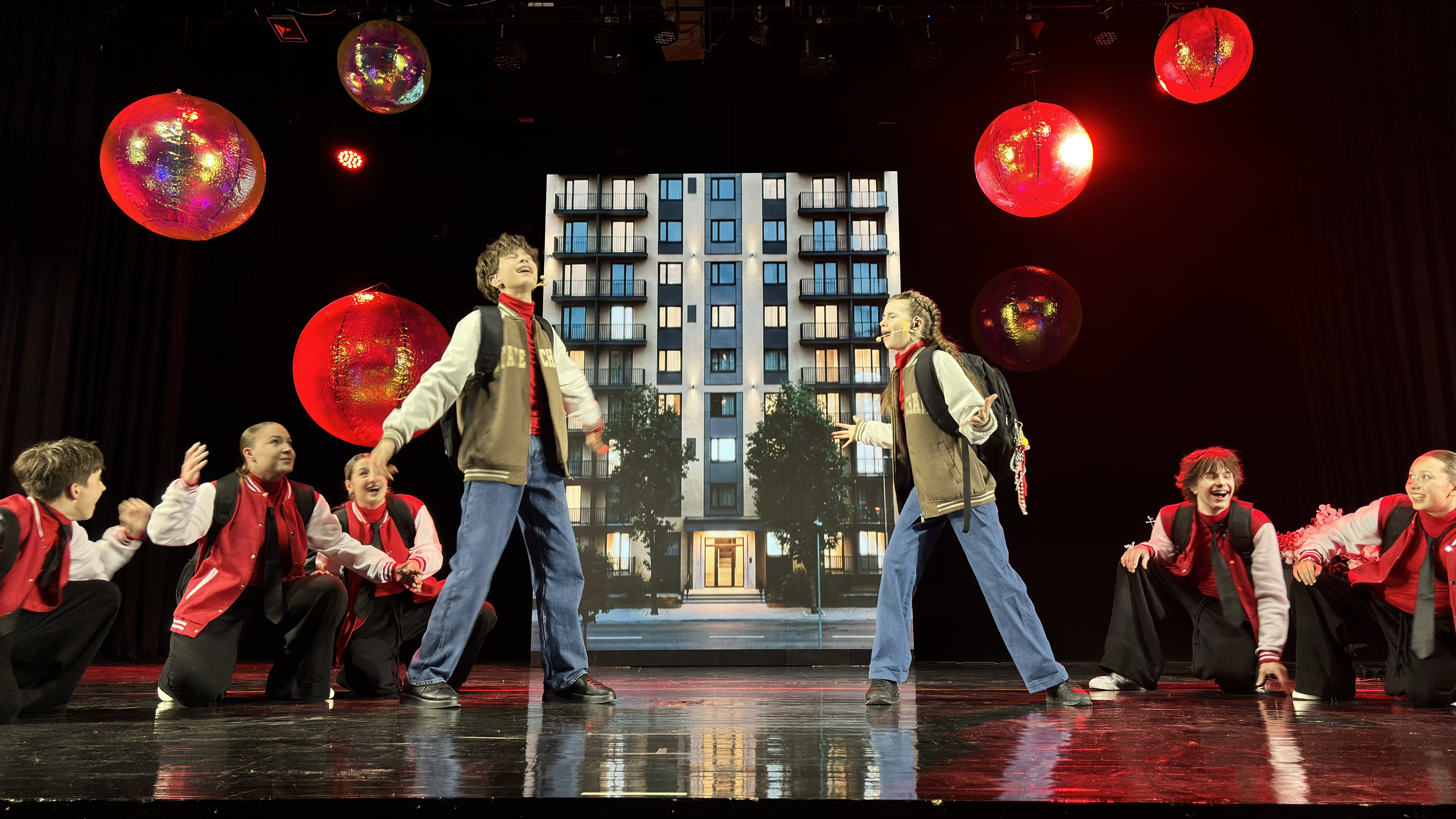
Kotenko and Ivaniv at the beginning of the musical in Chernihiv, 21 February 2026

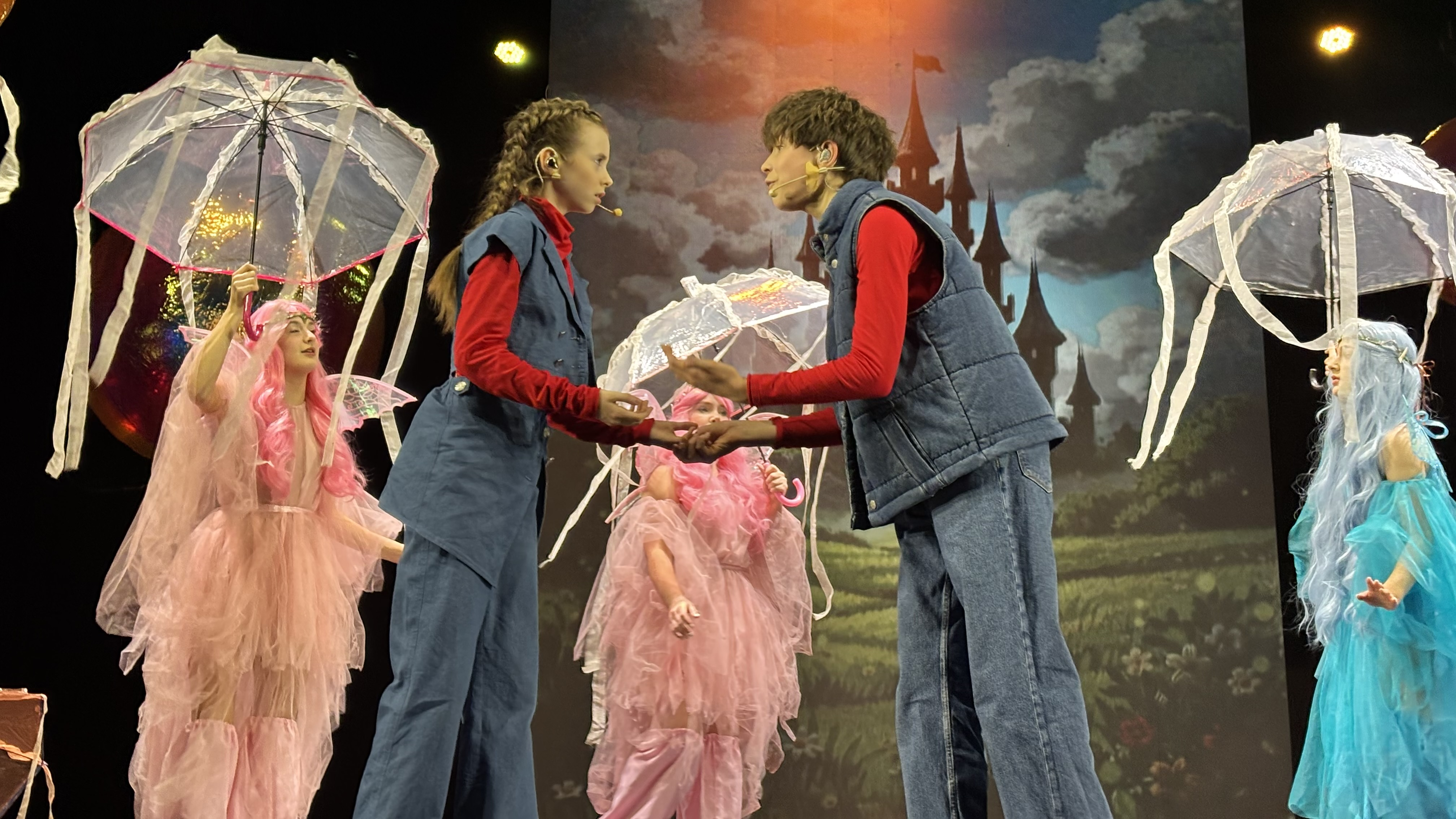
Kotenko and Ivaniv during a scene of the musical in Chernihiv

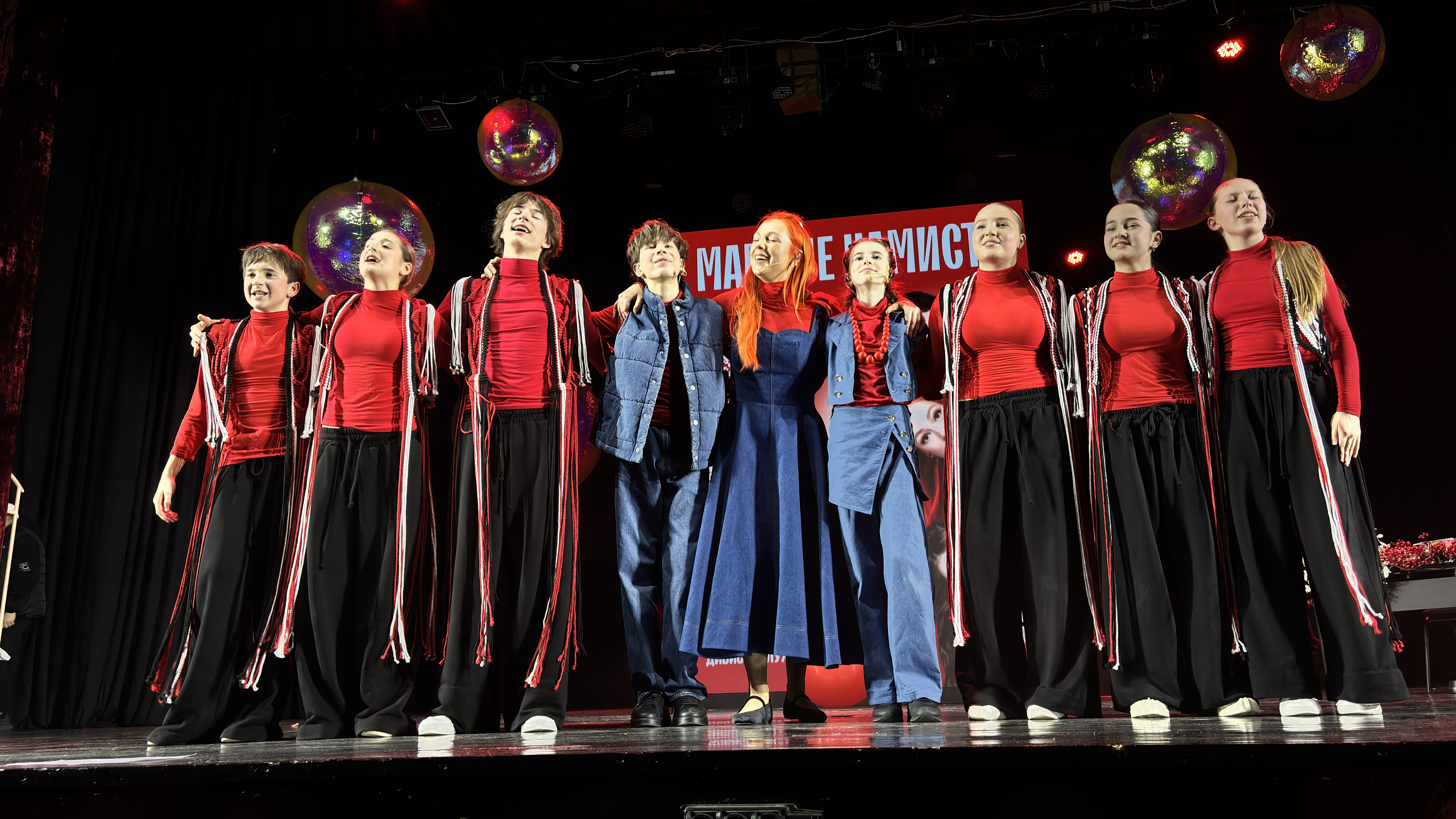
Group photo of the main characters Kotenko, Ivaniv, Tarabarova and dancers in Chernihiv

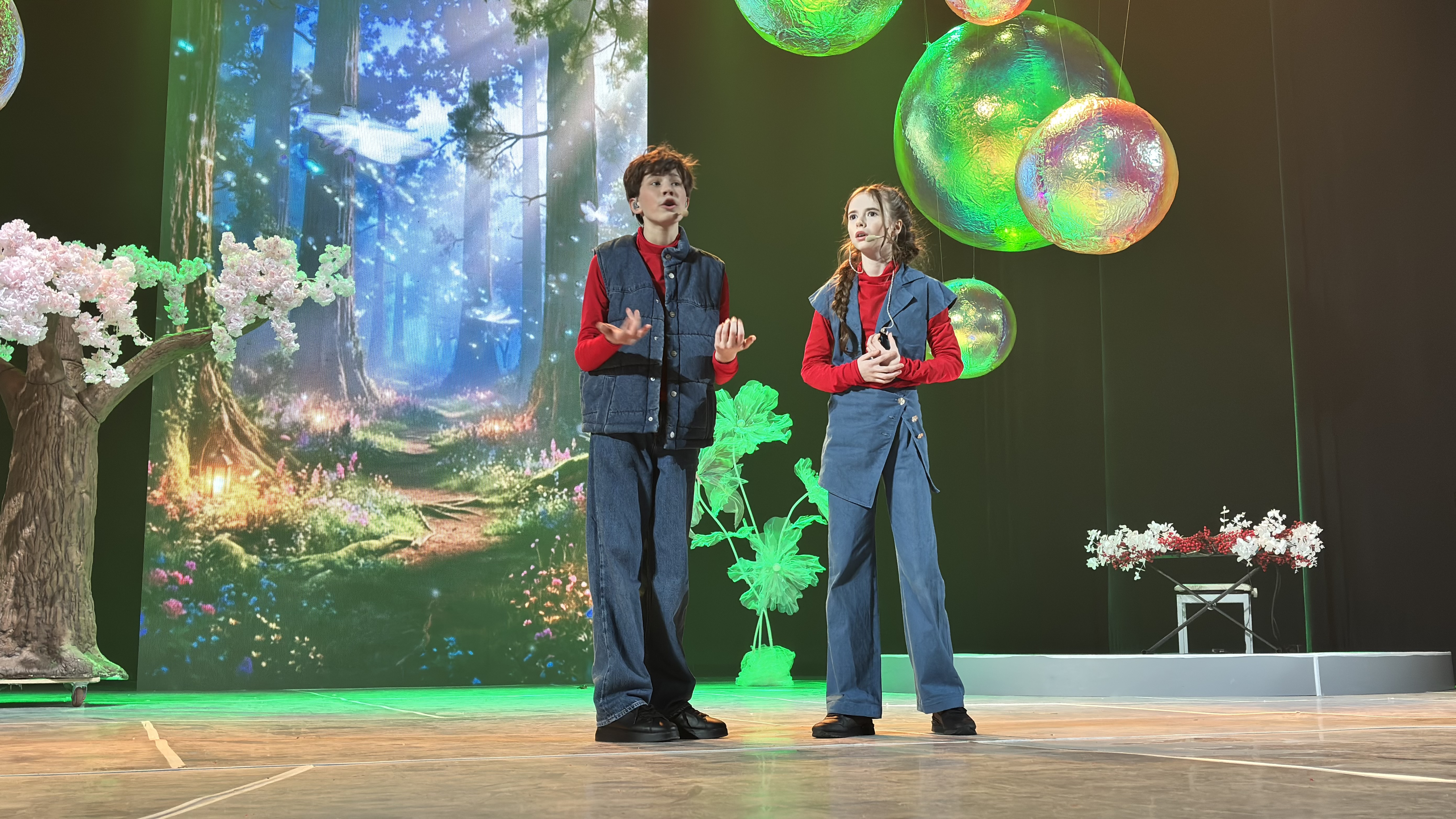
Kotenko and Ivaniv during the musical in Kyiv, 22 February 2026

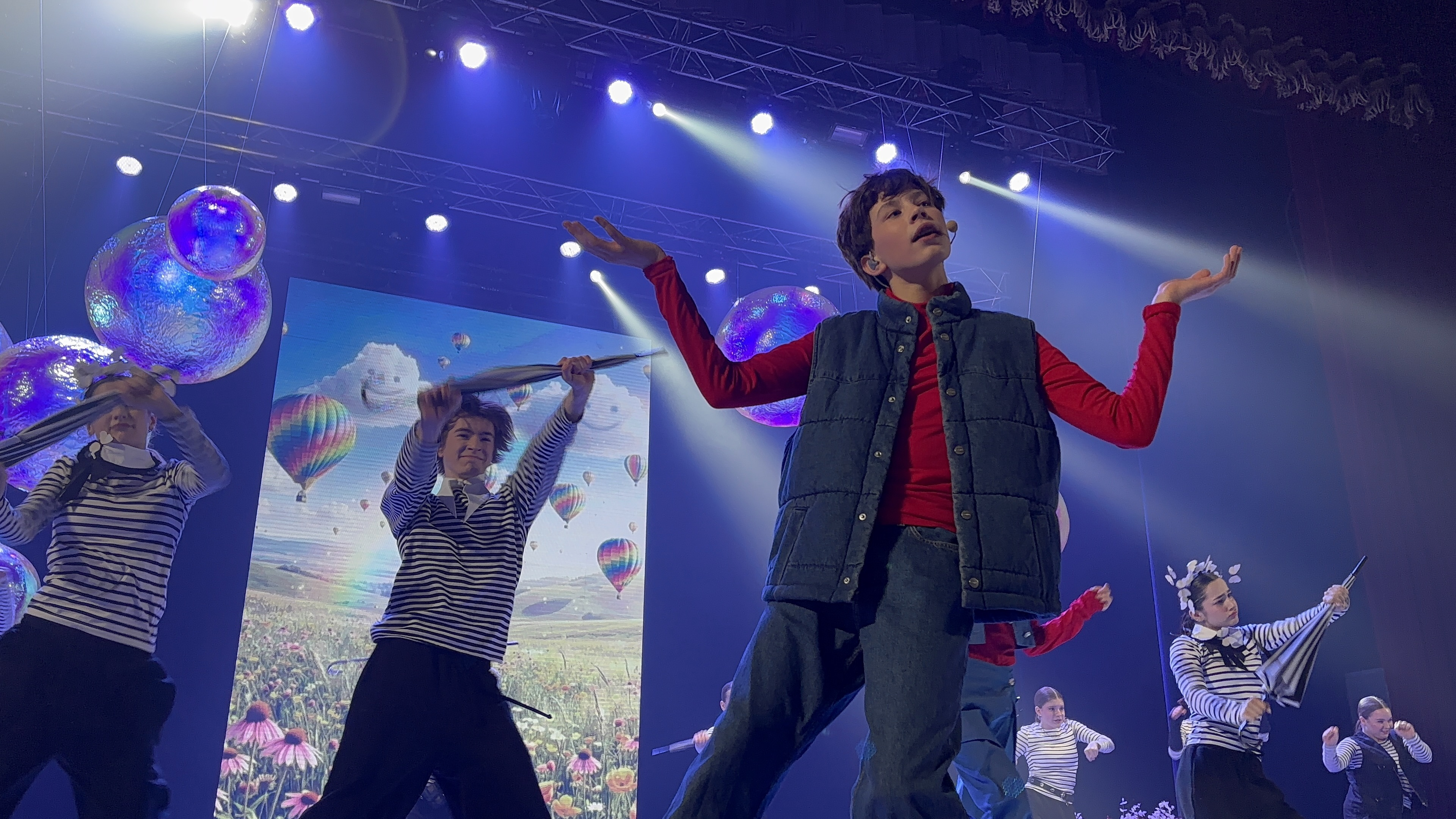
Kotenko performing in Kyiv

On 15 January 2026, Kotenko participated in the press conference dedicated to the final of the national selection for the Eurovision Song Contest 2026, held on the Origin Stage in Kyiv. During the event, he performed on stage with other guest artists during the presentation of the finalists' songs and their running order draw.

On 7 February 2026, Kotenko performed as an interval act during the final of the national selection for the Eurovision Song Contest 2026. Together with Svitlana Tarabarova, Ukraine's Junior Eurovision representatives Anastasia Dymyd (2023) and Sofiia Nersesian (2025), and musicians from the Superhumans Center, he took part in a special musical number.

On 15 February 2026, a joint solo concert with Sofiia Nersesian took place at the Origin Stage in Kyiv. The event became the first concert in the Ukrainian children's music industry to receive official "sold out" status.

On 8 April 2026, Kotenko once again performed on the stage of the October Palace as part of the Big Spring Concert by Hit FM. During the show, he presented his new song "Vitaminka", which was released on the same day.

On 27 June 2026, Kotenko performed as a special guest at the Expocenter of Ukraine in Kyiv at the opening of Max Barskih's all-Ukrainian festival "There is Meaning in Today" (Open Air Fest).

On 22 July 2026, it was revealed that Kotenko would embark on his first solo tour, Vitaminka, scheduled to run across Ukraine from October to December.

On 26 July 2026, Kotenko performed as a guest artist at the first open live audition for the longlisted participants of the national selection for the Junior Eurovision Song Contest 2026, held at the Respublica Park shopping mall in Kyiv.

On 23 October Kotenko released the song “365”

== Discography ==
=== Studio albums ===
Title	Details
Repeat	Released: 18 July 2025; Label: TAVR Records; Format: Digital download, streaming

=== Singles ===
==== As lead artist ====
Title	Year	Album or EP
"Hear Me Now"	2024	Non-album single
"Napevno, daremno"	2024	Repeat
"Bff" (with Nicole)	2025	Non-album single
"Filtry"	2025	Repeat
"Khai pyshut" (with Volianska)	2025	Non-album single
"Ya lechu"	2025	Repeat
"Znovu na repit"	2025	Repeat
"Pro tebe"	2025	Repeat
"Neidealni"	2025	Repeat
"Non stop"	2025	Repeat
"Golden Union"	2025	Non-album singles
"Bam Bam Bam" (with Demi)	2025	Non-album singles
"Ya znaiu"	2026	Non-album singles
"Yakshcho ty poruch" (with Zlata Ivaniv)	2026	Non-album singles
"Vitaminka"	2026	Non-album singles
"A meni ok"	2026	Non-album singles
"Sho ty sho (norm chy strom)"	2026	Non-album singles
"365"	2026	Non-album singles

=== Music videos ===
Title	Year	Director
"Bff"	2025	Oleksandr Hirchenko
"Filtry"	2025	Danylo Diemiekhin
"Khai pyshut"	2025	Danylo Diemiekhin
"Znovu na repit"	2025	Nazar Hloviak
"Bam Bam Bam"	2025	Lesya Hurovska
"Ya znaiu"	2026	Danylo Diemiekhin
"Yakshcho ty poruch"	2026	Danylo Diemiekhin
"Vitaminka"	2026	Danylo Diemiekhin
"A meni ok"	2026	Danylo Diemiekhin
"Sho ty sho (norm chy strom)"	2026	Viksinua
"365"	2026	Danylo Diemiekhin

== Tours ==
Headlining

- Vitaminka (2026)

Supporting

- Mamyne Namysto (2026)

== Awards and nominations ==
Year	Award	Category	Nominee(s)	Result	Ref.
2026	Muzvar Awards	«New Breath» (Best New Names in Pop Music)	Artem Kotenko	Nominated	

Awards and achievements
Preceded by Anastasiia Dymyd with "Kvitka"	Ukraine in the Junior Eurovision Song Contest; 2024	Succeeded by Sofiia Nersesian with "Motanka"
