= San Marino in the Junior Eurovision Song Contest 2024 =

Sanmarinese entry in pan-European song contest for children and young teenagers

- Junior Eurovision Song Contest 2024
- Participating broadcaster: San Marino RTV (SMRTV)
- Country: San Marino
- Selection process: Internal selection
- Announcement date: Artist: 11 September 2024; Song: 5 October 2024

Competing entry
- Song: "Come noi"
- Artist: Idols SM
- Songwriters: Francesco Sancisi; Nicola Della Valle; Paolo Macina

Placement
- Final result: 17th, 47 points

Participation chronology

San Marino was represented at the Junior Eurovision Song Contest 2024 with the song "Come noi", written by Francesco Sancisi, Nicola Della Valle and Paolo Macina, and performed by Idols SM. The Sammarinese participating broadcaster, San Marino RTV (SMRTV), internally selected its entry for the contest.

== Background ==
Prior to the 2024 contest, San Marino had participated in the contest three times since its first entry in the 2013 contest; before their first appearance, San Marino was set to take part in 2011, however withdrew before the contest was held. San Marino has never won the contest, with their best result being in 2013, when Michele Perniola represented the country with "O-o-O Sole intorno a me", placing 10th; Perniola would go on to represent San Marino in the Eurovision Song Contest 2015 alongside Anita Simoncini, who represented San Marino in the 2014 junior contest as part of the group The Peppermints. The nation opted not to take part in the contest between 2016 and 2023. In 2015, Kamilla Ismailova competed for San Marino with the song "Mirror", which ended up in 14th place with 36 points.

== Before Junior Eurovision ==
Despite SMRTV originally confirming non-participation in the 2024 contest, upon the announcement of the participants list by the EBU on 3 September 2024, it was revealed that San Marino would return to the contest after an eight-year absence; this was later reaffirmed by SMRTV and the Sammarinese Ministry of Tourism, which was put in charge of the nation's participation in the contest.

On 5 September 2024, SMRTV announced that it had internally selected the Sammarinese entrant for the contest and that they would be revealed during the charity gala Sogna ragazzo sogna ("Dream, child, dream") on 11 September, with the entry to be selected during a "small informal competition" during the event. The entrants were announced to be Idols SM with the song "Come noi", which was released on 5 October; the song was selected by a "popular jury" following an assessment of two candidate songs, both written by Miodio members Francesco Sancisi, Nicola Della Valle and Paolo Macina, the other being "Poesia".

== At Junior Eurovision ==
The Junior Eurovision Song Contest 2024 took place at Caja Mágica in Madrid, Spain on 16 November 2024. San Marino performed 13th, following the Netherlands and preceding Ukraine.

=== Voting ===
The same voting system that was introduced in the 2017 edition was used, where the results were determined by 50% online voting and 50% jury voting. Every participating broadcaster assembled a national jury that consisted of three music industry professionals and two children aged between 10 and 15 who were citizens of the country they represented. The rankings of those jurors were combined to make an overall top ten.

The online voting consisted of two phases. The first phase of the online voting began on 15 November 2024 when a recap of all the rehearsal performances was shown on the contest's website Junioreurovision.tv before the viewers could vote. After this, voters also had the option to watch longer one-minute clips from each participant's rehearsal. This first round of voting ended on 16 November at 17:59 CET. The second phase of the online voting took place during the live show and began right after the last performance and was open for 15 minutes. International viewers were able to vote for three songs. They were also able to vote for their own country's song. These votes were then turned into points which were determined by the percentage of votes received. For example, if a song received 10% of the votes, it received 10% of the available points.

At the end of the show, San Marino received 1 point from juries and 46 points from online voting, placing in last place for its first time ever.

Points awarded to San Marino
Score	Country
12 points	
10 points	
8 points	
7 points	
6 points	
5 points	
4 points	
3 points	
2 points	
1 point	Italy
San Marino received 46 points from the online vote

Points awarded by San Marino
Score	Country
12 points	Georgia
10 points	Malta
8 points	Spain
7 points	France
6 points	Italy
5 points	Netherlands
4 points	Ukraine
3 points	Albania
2 points	Armenia
1 point	North Macedonia

==== Detailed voting results ====
The following members comprised the Sammarinese jury:

- Nicola Bollini
- Piermatteo Carattoni
- Alice Fiorini
- Barbara Andreini
- Nathalie Amelie Huguette Locheron

Detailed voting results from San Marino
Draw	Country	Juror A	Juror B	Juror C	Juror D	Juror E	Rank	Points
01	Italy	10	1	4	11	10	5	6
02	Estonia	15	8	5	12	14	13	
03	Albania	7	12	3	13	7	8	3
04	Armenia	5	5	11	6	15	9	2
05	Cyprus	16	11	14	15	16	16	
06	France	3	9	15	2	3	4	7
07	North Macedonia	9	13	2	14	11	10	1
08	Poland	14	14	10	10	13	15	
09	Georgia	1	4	1	1	6	1	12
10	Spain	8	2	13	5	1	3	8
11	Germany	11	6	7	9	9	11	
12	Netherlands	6	3	8	8	5	6	5
13	San Marino							
14	Ukraine	4	15	16	7	4	7	4
15	Portugal	13	10	9	16	8	14	
16	Ireland	12	16	12	3	12	12	
17	Malta	2	7	6	4	2	2	10
