= Miodio =

Sammarinese-Italian band

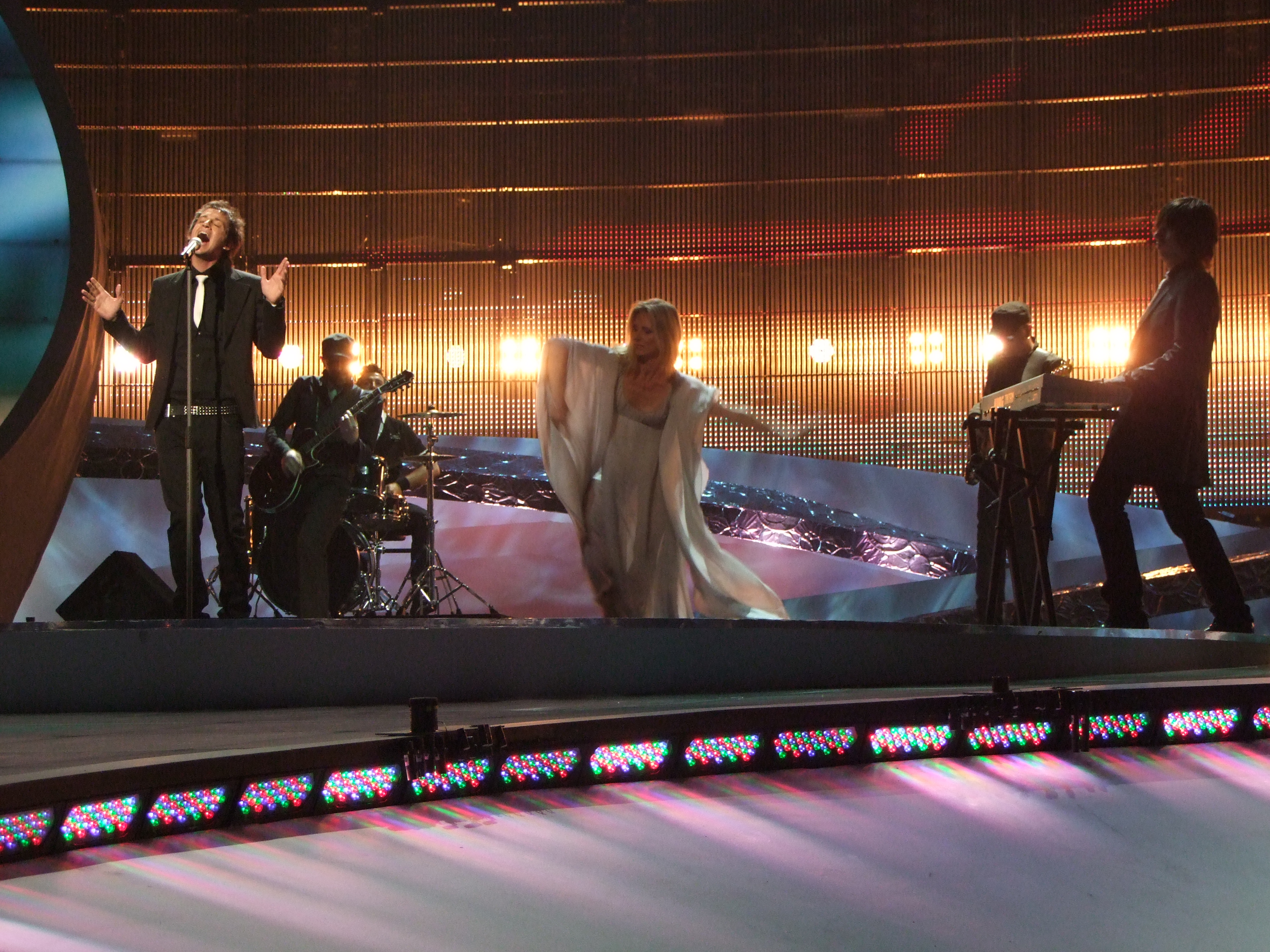
- Miodio at the Eurovision semi-final in Belgrade

Background information
- Origin: Italy, San Marino
- Genre: Alternative rock
- Years active: 2002–present
- Members: Nicola Della Valle; Paolo Macina; Andrea Marco Pollice; Francesco "Sancho" Sancisi; Alessandro Gobbi

Miodio ([mjoˈdiːo]) is a band that consists of three Italian and two Sammarinese members. They represented San Marino in the Eurovision Song Contest 2008, performing the song Complice. This was the first time San Marino had entered the competition. They performed in the 5th position after Moldova and before Belgium. They however failed to get past the first semi-final on 20 May, only receiving 5 points and placing last of 19.

Miodio was founded in the winter of 2002, and they have published a mini-album with 5 tracks. This album was produced by the label "Acanto" owned by the producer and composer Andrea Felli. In 2007 they entered into an exclusive contract with Opera Prima, a record label, releasing their first single "It's Ok", which is still played by more than a hundred national radio stations. The song has been also included in the soundtrack of the movie "Il Soffio dell'Anima" and is listed in the iTunes Store.

The group was selected by an internal jury, after applying through an open invitation for entrants to represent San Marino.

Miodio are the winners of the 17th edition of San Marino Festival as well as the winners of the prize 'Viva Music' and 'Best Original Song' at the 2006 Arts Festival in Bologna. They also represented San Marino at the 12th Biennial of Young Artists of Europe held in Naples, where the band presented a 30-minute filmshot, edited and produced by themselves and praised by an international jury.

The band was slated to record their first proper album containing eleven tracks, which was to be released in the summer of 2008; this album was however never released.

In 2009 Miodio released the single Evoluzione Genetica which they performed at Wind Music Awards 2009.

Late in 2009 they entered the revamped Newcomers' section of 2010 Festival della canzone italiana, with the new single called "Perdo contatto" (in English: "I lose contact").

In 2020, they formed a supergroup named San Marino United Artists with Valentina Monetta, Anita Simoncini, MC Irol, and more.

== Eurovision Song Contest 2008 ==
In 2008, Miodio was announced as San Marino's first participants at the Eurovision Song Contest for the 2008 contest. They were selected internally by Sammarinese broadcaster San Marino RTV with their song Complice, written by band members Francesco Sancisi and Nicola Della Valle. They participated in Belgrade, Serbia, at the first semi-final against 18 other countries. They, however, only received 5 points and finished last (19th) in the first semi-final. Following Eurovision Miodio went on to compete in the Golden Stag Festival in Romania, as well as the Pjesma Mediterana contest in Montenegro. They also went on tour in Italy, San Marino and Moldova during the summer.

== Members ==
- Nicola Della Valle, lead vocals
- Paolo Macina, guitars
- Andrea Marco Pollice, nicknamed "Polly", bass and programming
- Francesco "Sancho" Sancisi, keyboard and programming
- Alessandro Gobbi, drums

== Songs by Miodio ==
- Complice
- Idea
- It's Ok
- Neve Nera
- Credo
- Evoluzione Genetica

== See also ==
- San Marino in the Eurovision Song Contest
- San Marino in the Eurovision Song Contest 2008

Awards and achievements
Preceded by None (Debut entry)	San Marino in the Eurovision Song Contest; 2008	Succeeded by Senit with "Stand By"
