= Armenia in the Junior Eurovision Song Contest 2009 =

- Junior Eurovision Song Contest 2009
- Country: Armenia
- Selection process: National Final
- Selection date: 11 July 2009

Competing entry
- Song: "Barcelona"
- Artist: Luara Hayrapetyan

Placement
- Final result: 2nd, 116 points

Participation chronology

Armenia selected their Junior Eurovision Song Contest 2009 entry by a national final. The winner was Luara Hayrapetyan with "Barcelona", which represented Armenia in the Junior Eurovision Song Contest 2009 on 21 November 2009.

== Before Junior Eurovision ==
=== National final ===
A submission period for artists was held until 29 June 2009. 15 entries were received, and 7 entries were chosen for the national final.

The final was held on 11 July 2009. Seven songs competed and the winner was chosen by a 50/50 combination of televoting and the votes from an "expert" jury.

Final – 11 July 2009
Draw	Artist	Song	Jury	Televote		Total	Place
1	Julie Berberyan & Lika Musheghyan	"Menq"	3	303	6	9	5
2	Angel Petrosyan	"Yerjanik mankutyun"	5	133	7	12	6
3	Chermak Ampikner	"Heqiatayin yerkinq"	4	607	4	8	3
4	Luara Hayrapetyan	"Barcelona"	1	944	1	2	1
5	Urakh Ghoghanjner	"Lusin - Arev"	6	805	3	9	4
6	Zangak	"Dproc te poghoc"	7	329	5	12	6
7	Razmik Aghajanyan	"Yerjankutyun"	2	861	2	4	2

== At Junior Eurovision ==
=== Voting ===
Points awarded to Armenia
Score	Country
12 points (Note: All countries received one set of 12 points to ensure no country finished with nul points.)	Cyprus; Georgia; Russia
10 points	Belgium; Netherlands; Sweden; Ukraine
8 points	Belarus
7 points	Serbia
6 points	Malta; Romania
5 points	
4 points	
3 points	
2 points	
1 point	Macedonia

Points awarded by Armenia
Score	Country
12 points	Ukraine
10 points	Russia
8 points	Netherlands
7 points	Belgium
6 points	Georgia
5 points	Sweden
4 points	Malta
3 points	Serbia
2 points	Cyprus
1 point	Belarus
