= Ukraine in the Junior Eurovision Song Contest 2009 =

- Junior Eurovision Song Contest 2009
- Participating broadcaster: National Television Company of Ukraine (NTU)
- Country: Ukraine
- Selection process: National Final
- Selection date: 14 June 2009

Competing entry
- Song: "Tri topoli, tri surmy"
- Artist: Andranik Alexanyan
- Songwriters: Andranik Alexanyan; Anastasiya Kravchenko; Maria Kravchenko; Sophia Zlotnyk

Placement
- Final result: 5th, 89 points

Participation chronology

Ukraine was represented at the Junior Eurovision Song Contest 2009 with the song "Tri topoli, tri surmy", written by Andranik Alexanyan, Anastasiya Kravchenko, Maria Kravchenko, and Sophia Zlotnyk, and performed by Alexanyan himself. The Ukrainian participating broadcaster, the National Television Company of Ukraine (NTU), held a national final to select its entry for the contest. In addition, NTU was also the host broadcaster and staged the event at the Palace of Sports in Kyiv.

== Before Junior Eurovision ==
=== National final ===
The National Television Company of Ukraine (NTU) held a national final to select its entry to the Junior Eurovision Song Contest 2009. From the 70 accepted entries received by NTU for the contest, a professional jury selected 32 to compete in a pre-recorded semi-final on 14 May 2009. The members of the jury were Roman Nedzelskiy (vice-president of NTU), Mihaylo Chemberzhi (director of the Kyiv Youth Academy of Arts), Natalia Efimenko (vocal tutor of the Kyiv Music Academy) Victor Knysh (director of representative office of Artek in Kyiv and staging director of the national final), Olexander Zlotnik (composer), Marina Modina (singer) and Nadya Atonasova (head of dance studio "A6").

==== Semi-final ====
At the semi-final on 14 May 2009, 15 entries were selected by the jury to progress to the live final on 14 June 2009.

==== Final ====
The final, attended by Prime Minister of Ukraine Yulia Tymoshenko, took place on 14 June 2009 at the International Children's Centre 'Artek' in Kyiv, and was hosted by commentator for Eurovision and Junior Eurovision Timur Miroshnychenko and three-time participant at the Ukrainian Junior national final Marietta. Fifteen competing acts participated in the televised production where the winner was determined by a 50/50 combination of both public telephone vote and the votes of jury members made up of music professionals. Andranik Alexanyan was selected to represent Ukraine with the song "Try topoli, try surmy". Only the televoting results were revealed, which Olexander Chernenko won. Andranik Alexanyan came second and Liza Malaeva came in third.

The members of the jury that voted in the final were Vasil Ilaschuk (president of NTU), Yuriy Pavlenko (Minister for Family, Youth and Sports Affairs), Vasil Vovkun (Minister for Culture and Tourism Affairs), Mihaylo Chemberzhi (director of the Kyiv Youth Academy of Arts), Olexander Zlotnik (composer), Boris Novozhilov (director of the International Children's Centre 'Artek'), Marina Modina (singer) and Vasyl Lazarovych (singer).

R/O	Artist	Song
1	Kapriz	"Super Song"
2	Nguen Li	"Melodiya" (Мелодія)
3	Katerina Kuritsina	"Ya i ty" (Я і ти)
4	Marina Lozinska	"Litak" (Літак)
5	Daniela Yakobchuk	"Pisnya sribnoyi zemli" (Пісня срібної землі)
6	Liza Malaeva	"Litnya samba" (Літня самба)
7	Valentina Danilyuk	"Malesenke kohannya" (Малесеньке кохання)
8	Andranik Alexanyan	"Try topoli, try surmy" (Три тополі, три сурми)
9	Karina Mazuryk	"Disco Lady"
10	Vladislav Karaschuk	"Planeta dytynstva" (Планета дитинства)
11	Valeriya & Anastasiya Groshko	"Tsikavyy svit" (Цікавий світ)
12	Katerina Panchenko	"Ya zapytayu" (Я запитаю)
13	Olexander Chernenko	"Kazka" (Казка)
14	Anna Kudryashova	"Misyats" (Місяць)
15	Dmitro Borodyn	"Zirka" (Зірка)

== At Eurovision ==
=== Voting ===
Points awarded to Ukraine
Score	Country
12 points (Note: All countries received one set of 12 points to ensure no country finished with nul points.)	Armenia
10 points	Belarus; Georgia; Romania
8 points	
7 points	Russia
6 points	
5 points	Cyprus; Macedonia; Netherlands
4 points	Malta; Sweden
3 points	Belgium
2 points	Serbia
1 point	

Points awarded by Ukraine
Score	Country
12 points	Russia
10 points	Armenia
8 points	Netherlands
7 points	Belarus
6 points	Georgia
5 points	Belgium
4 points	Sweden
3 points	Serbia
2 points	Macedonia
1 point	Malta
