= Russia in the Junior Eurovision Song Contest 2009 =

- Junior Eurovision Song Contest 2009
- Country: Russia
- Selection process: National Final
- Selection date: 31 May 2009

Competing entry
- Song: "Malenkiy prints"
- Artist: Ekaterina Ryabova

Placement
- Final result: 2nd, 116 points

Participation chronology

Russia was represented at the Junior Eurovision Song Contest 2009 in Kyiv, Ukraine. The Russian entry was selected through a national final, organised by Russian broadcaster All-Russia State Television and Radio Company (VGTRK). The final was held on 31 May 2009. Ekaterina Ryabova and her song "Malenkiy prints" won the national final, getting 12.07% of votes.

== Before Junior Eurovision ==
=== National Final ===
On 14 March 2009, VGTRK announced that a national final would be held to select Russia's entry for the Junior Eurovision Song Contest 2009. A submission period for interested artists was opened and lasted until 20 April 2009. A professional jury selected twenty artists and songs from the applicants to proceed to the televised national final.

The selected artists and songs competed at the national final which took place on 31 May 2009 at the Russian Academy of Sciences' concert hall in Moscow, hosted by Oksana Fedorova and Oskar Kuchera. In addition to the performances from the competitors, the show featured guest performances by Dima Bilan, Valeriya and band "Domisolki". The members of the backup jury were Maksim Dunayevsky, Larisa Rubalskaya, Grigoriy Gladkov, Yana Rudkovskaya and Gennadiy Gohshtein.

Final – 31 May 2009
Draw	Artist	Song	Televote	Place
1	Aleksandra Kozlova	"Tsvetnye sny"	3.13%	16
2	Nellya Kolchina	"Step"	5.16%	10
3	Ekaterina Ryabova	"Malenkiy prints"	12.07%	1
4	Arina Doronina	"Deti, muzyka I tantsy"	5.31%	9
5	Vlada Sergeeva	"Emelya"	5.47%	8
6	Band "Papiny deti"	"Parus mechty"	1.82%	19
7	Irina Dzhantemirova	"Put-doroga"	2.32%	17
8	Pavel Artemov	"Ya lyublyu rock-n-roll"	8.18%	2
9	Alina Tyumirekova	"Hora polyh"	1.51%	20
10	Yuliana Savilova	"Fantazyorka"	3.35%	15
11	Esmiralda Shoniya	"Devochka-teenager"	4.31%	12
12	Band "Podruzhki"	"Bashkortostan"	3.57%	14
13	Duet "Akvilon"	"Poletim v lyubov"	6.43%	5
14	Anastasiya Tarasova	"Ya uletayu"	4.12%	13
15	Show-band "Kinder-syurpriz"	"Ryzhiy"	5.02%	11
16	Aleksandr Zinovyev	"On v Rossiyu hotel"	6.68%	4
17	Alina Shaygorodskaya	"Solo-shag"	2.11%	18
18	Aleksey Tsvetkov	"Ya lyotchik"	6.21%	6
19	Anastasiya Karamysheva	"Kukushechka"	7.06%	3
20	Band "Muzykalniy fregat"	"Supermama"	6.17%	7

== At Junior Eurovision ==
During the allocation draw on 13 October 2009, Russia was drawn to perform 2nd, following Sweden and preceding Armenia. Russia placed 3rd, scoring 116 points.

Katya Ryabova was joined on stage by four girls from a dance troupe.

In Russia, show were broadcast on Russia-1 with commentary by Olga Shelest. The Russian spokesperson revealing the result of the Russian vote was Philipp Masurov.

=== Voting ===
Points awarded to Russia
Score	Country
12 points (Note: All countries received one set of 12 points to ensure no country finished with nul points.)	Belarus; Ukraine
10 points	Armenia; Cyprus; Serbia
8 points	Belgium; Romania
7 points	Georgia; Macedonia; Malta; Netherlands
6 points	Sweden
5 points	
4 points	
3 points	
2 points	
1 point	

Points awarded by Russia
Score	Country
12 points	Armenia
10 points	Belgium
8 points	Netherlands
7 points	Ukraine
6 points	Belarus
5 points	Georgia
4 points	Sweden
3 points	Cyprus
2 points	Malta
1 point	Serbia
