= Sweden in the Junior Eurovision Song Contest 2009 =

- Junior Eurovision Song Contest 2009
- Country: Sweden
- Selection process: Internal Selection
- Selection date: 27 September 2009

Competing entry
- Song: "Du"
- Artist: Mimmi Sandén

Placement
- Final result: 6th, 68 points

Participation chronology

Sweden returned to the Junior Eurovision Song Contest in 2009, after missing the 2008 Contest. TV4 held an internal selection to select the Swedish entry, which competed at the Contest on 21 November. The TV4 jury selected Mimmi Sandén to compete for Sweden, with the song "Du" (You).

== Before Junior Eurovision ==
=== Internal selection ===
TV4 announced their return to the Contest on 9 June 2009. Despite Junior Eurovision Song Contest rules that say "To select its contestant, each participating broadcaster shall organize a televised national selection," TV4 opted for an internal selection process being granted exception from the rule by the Steering Group of the contest. The broadcaster invited children from around Sweden between 10 and 15 to enter songs into the selection, up to 3 August. Afterwards a jury made up of representatives of Warner Music and TV4, headed by Bert Karlsson, selected the winner who would represent Sweden at the contest. Karlsson said that he hoped that the Contest would help build a career for the chosen artist, comparing to other artists who began at a young age, such as Carola and Lotta Engberg.

TV4 revealed that they had selected Mimmi Sandén to represent Sweden at Kyiv. She is the sister of Molly and Frida Sandén, who both represented Sweden at Junior Eurovision, in 2006 and 2007 respectively, and came second on TV4's Talang 2007, the Swedish version of the Got Talent series. She sang "Du" (You) at the contest, which was written by Mimmi, Alexander Kronlund and Ali Payami, and was first presented on 27 September on TV4's Bingolotto.

== At Junior Eurovision ==
=== Voting ===
Mimmi opened the contest on 21 November, performing as the first song. At the close of the voting she received 68 points, placing sixth.

Points awarded to Sweden
Score	Country
12 points (Note: All countries received one set of 12 points to ensure no country finished with nul points.)	
10 points	
8 points	Macedonia
7 points	Belgium
6 points	Netherlands
5 points	Armenia; Belarus; Malta; Serbia
4 points	Russia; Ukraine
3 points	Georgia
2 points	Cyprus; Romania
1 point	

Points awarded by Sweden
Score	Country
12 points	Netherlands
10 points	Armenia
8 points	Belgium
7 points	Cyprus
6 points	Russia
5 points	Macedonia
4 points	Ukraine
3 points	Georgia
2 points	Serbia
1 point	Romania
