= Serbia in the Junior Eurovision Song Contest 2009 =

- Junior Eurovision Song Contest 2009
- Country: Serbia
- Selection process: National Final
- Selection date: 19 September 2009

Competing entry
- Song: "Onaj pravi"
- Artist: Ništa lično

Placement
- Final result: 10th, 34 points

Participation chronology

Serbia competed at the Junior Eurovision Song Contest 2009, held in Kyiv, Ukraine. RTS held a national final to select the fourth Serbian entry for the contest in September 2009. The winner of pre-selection and Serbian representative in Kyiv was the group Ništa Lično with pop-rock song "Onaj pravi". The group members are Anica Cvetković, the leading vocal, Aleksandar Graić, composer and pianist, who is a son of composer of "Molitva", winning song of Eurovision Song Contest 2007, Una Krlić and Karolina Lodi, as the guitarists and Petar Cvetković, Anica's brother, with drums.

== Before Junior Eurovision ==
=== National final ===
RTS received 60 songs for the participation in the contest. A selection committee of music editors from RTS picked 10 songs that competed in the televised final. Public favourites were Boško Baloš, Jelena Krvavac, Emilija Marković, Marija Ugrica and the eventual winners Ništa Lično according to websites, online polls and the media.

The final took place in the studio 9 of the RTS Studios in Košutnjak on 19 September 2009. The winner was chosen by jury and televoting.

Draw	Artist	Song	Jury		Televote		Total	Place
Draw	Artist	Song	Votes	Points	Votes	Points	Total	Place
1	Marija Ugrica	"Hajde da sanjamo" (Хајде да сањамо)	19	4	176	2	6	9
2	Nastasja Škorić	"Duh" (Дух)	51	12	252	4	16	2
3	Isidora Otašević	"Dečaci" (Дечаци)	43	8	96	1	9	7
4	Hana Nurković & Lana Bogdanov	"Budi svoj" (Буди свој)	10	2	399	8	10	6
5	Boško Baloš	"Mali" (Мали)	43	7	376	7	14	4
6	Angelina & Jelisaveta Jovanović	"Sestrice" (Сестрице)	8	1	181	3	4	10
7	Ništa lično	"Onaj pravi" (Онај прави)	44	10	492	12	22	1
8	Čuće se	"Veštice" (Вештице)	26	5	461	10	15	3
9	Emilija Marković	"Magija" (Магија)	17	3	299	6	9	8
10	Jelena Krvavac	"Bez tebe" (Без тебе)	27	6	267	5	11	5

== At Junior Eurovision ==
During the allocation draw on 13 October 2009, Serbia was drawn to perform 5th, following Romania and preceding Georgia. Serbia placed 10th, scoring 34 points.

In Serbia, the show was broadcast on RTS 2 with commentary by Duška Vučinić-Lučić. The Serbian spokesperson revealing the result of the Serbian vote was Nevena Božović who represented Serbia in the 2007 contest.

=== Voting ===
Points awarded to Serbia
Score	Country
12 points (Note: All countries received one set of 12 points to ensure no country finished with nul points.)	
10 points	
8 points	
7 points	
6 points	
5 points	
4 points	Macedonia
3 points	Armenia; Cyprus; Romania; Ukraine
2 points	Georgia; Sweden
1 point	Belarus; Russia

Points awarded by Serbia
Score	Country
12 points	Belgium
10 points	Russia
8 points	Netherlands
7 points	Armenia
6 points	Macedonia
5 points	Sweden
4 points	Malta
3 points	Belarus
2 points	Ukraine
1 point	Georgia
