= Belgium in the Junior Eurovision Song Contest 2009 =

- Junior Eurovision Song Contest 2009
- Participating broadcaster: Vlaamse Radio- en Televisieomroeporganisatie (VRT)
- Country: Belgium
- Selection process: Junior Eurosong 2009
- Selection date: 26 September 2009

Competing entry
- Song: "Zo verliefd (Yodelo)"
- Artist: Laura Omloop
- Songwriters: Peter Gillis; Laura Omloop; Alain Vande Putte; Miguel Wiels

Placement
- Final result: 4th, 113 points

Participation chronology

Belgium was represented at the Junior Eurovision Song Contest 2009 with the song "Zo verliefd (Yodelo)", written by Peter Gillis, Laura Omloop, Alain Vande Putte, and Miguel Wiels, and performed by Omloop herself. The Belgian participating broadcaster, Vlaamse Radio- en Televisieomroeporganisatie (VRT), selected its entry for the contest through a national televised competition titled Junior Eurosong 2009.

== Before Eurovision ==
=== Junior Eurosong 2009 ===
Junior Eurosong 2009 was the 12-song national competition organised by Belgian broadcaster Vlaamse Radio- en Televisieomroeporganisatie (VRT) to select its entry for the Junior Eurovision Song Contest 2009.

Before the final, three semi-finals were held with four songs each. In each semi-final, four of the competing artists competed, performing abridged versions of their songs in two different versions, with televoting selecting the top two to qualify for the final. In the final, the winner was selected once again by televoting. A jury panel consisting of Kathleen Aerts and Walter Grootaers took part in all shows, but solely in an advisory role.

==== Competing entries ====
Around 500 songs were received by VRT for the contest, with only 12 (eleven in Dutch and one in French) being chosen to compete in the national final.

| Artist | Song (English translation) |
|---|---|
| Anke | "Ooh Daddy" |
| Haruka | "Waar ben je?" (Where are you?) |
| Kiviv | "Catwalk" |
| Las Niñas | "Jongens" (Boys) |
| Laura | "Zo verliefd" (So in love) |
| Manou | "Comment faire" (How to make) |
| Margo | "Vandaag is de dag" (Today is the day) |
| Pjotr | "Allemaal vrienden" (All friends) |
| Sepp 'n Sigi | "Die ene seconde" (That one second) |
| T&T | "Geniaal" (Brilliant) |
| Thomas | "Groot zijn" (Being big) |
| Tune | "Ik wil leven" (I want to live) |

==== Semi-final 1 ====
The first semi-final took place on 5 September 2009. Four of the competing artists performed two versions of their songs, with televoting selecting the top two to qualify for the final.

Semi-final 1 – 5 September 2009
| R/O | Artist | Song | Version | Result |
|---|---|---|---|---|
| 1 | Anke | "Ooh Daddy" | Jukebox Jive | —N/a |
| 2 | Anke | "Ooh Daddy" | Glam Rock | —N/a |
| 3 | T&T | "Geniaal" | Cool Cat | —N/a |
| 4 | T&T | "Geniaal" | Ruige Rock | Qualified |
| 5 | Las Niñas | "Jongens" | Punk Rock | —N/a |
| 6 | Las Niñas | "Jongens" | Girl Power | —N/a |
| 7 | Manou | "Comment faire" | Smokey Jazz | —N/a |
| 8 | Manou | "Comment faire" | Pop | Qualified |

==== Semi-final 2 ====
The second semi-final took place on 12 September 2009. Four of the competing artists performed two versions of their songs, with televoting selecting the top two to qualify for the final.

Semi-final 2 – 12 September 2009
| R/O | Artist | Song | Version | Result |
|---|---|---|---|---|
| 1 | Margo | "Vandaag is de dag" | Wonderland | —N/a |
| 2 | Margo | "Vandaag is de dag" | Fiesta Latina | —N/a |
| 3 | Thomas | "Groot zijn" | Dance | Qualified |
| 4 | Thomas | "Groot zijn" | Pop Rock | —N/a |
| 5 | Sepp 'n Sigi | "Die ene seconde" | Unplugged | —N/a |
| 6 | Sepp 'n Sigi | "Die ene seconde" | Softrock | Qualified |
| 7 | Haruka | "Waar ben je?" | Bollywood | —N/a |
| 8 | Haruka | "Waar ben je?" | Country | —N/a |

==== Semi-final 3 ====
The third semi-final took place on 19 September 2009. Four of the competing artists performed two versions of their songs, with televoting selecting the top two to qualify for the final.

Semi-final 3 – 19 September 2009
| R/O | Artist | Song | Version | Result |
|---|---|---|---|---|
| 1 | Pjotr | "Allemaal vrienden" | Pop Rock | —N/a |
| 2 | Pjotr | "Allemaal vrienden" | Ethnic | —N/a |
| 3 | Kiviv | "Catwalk" | A Lo Cubano | —N/a |
| 4 | Kiviv | "Catwalk" | Drumbeat | —N/a |
| 5 | Tune | "Ik wil leven" | 80's Revival | —N/a |
| 6 | Tune | "Ik wil leven" | Guitar Rock | Qualified |
| 7 | Laura | "Zo verliefd" | Classic | —N/a |
| 8 | Laura | "Zo verliefd" | Yodel | Qualified |

==== Final ====
The final took place on 19 September 2009, where the six qualifiers from the preceding semi-finals competed. The winner was selected by televoting. Only the top two songs were announced.

Final – 26 September 2009
| R/O | Artist | Song | Place |
|---|---|---|---|
| 1 | Tune | "Ik wil leven" | —N/a |
| 2 | Manou | "Comment faire" | 2 |
| 3 | T&T | "Geniaal" | —N/a |
| 4 | Sepp 'n Sigi | "Die ene seconde" | —N/a |
| 5 | Laura | "Zo verliefd" | 1 |
| 6 | Thomas | "Groot zijn" | —N/a |

== At Junior Eurovision ==
=== Voting ===
At Junior Eurovision,Laura performed 11th,preceding Belarus and following Ukraine.The highest points for this song were 12 points from FYR Macedonia,Malta,the Netherlands and Serbia.

Points awarded to Belgium
| Score | Country |
|---|---|
| 12 points (Note: All countries received one set of 12 points to ensure no country finished with nul points.) | Macedonia; Malta; Netherlands; Serbia |
| 10 points | Russia |
| 8 points | Sweden |
| 7 points | Armenia |
| 6 points | Belarus; Cyprus; Georgia |
| 5 points | Romania; Ukraine |
| 4 points | |
| 3 points | |
| 2 points | |
| 1 point | |

Points awarded by Belgium
| Score | Country |
|---|---|
| 12 points | Netherlands |
| 10 points | Armenia |
| 8 points | Russia |
| 7 points | Sweden |
| 6 points | Malta |
| 5 points | Georgia |
| 4 points | Belarus |
| 3 points | Ukraine |
| 2 points | Cyprus |
| 1 point | Macedonia |
