= Netherlands in the Junior Eurovision Song Contest 2009 =

- Junior Eurovision Song Contest 2009
- Participating broadcaster: Algemene Vereniging Radio Omroep (AVRO)
- Country: Netherlands
- Selection process: Junior Songfestival 2009
- Selection date: 3 October 2009

Competing entry
- Song: "Click Clack"
- Artist: Ralf Mackenbach
- Songwriters: Jan van den Langenberg; Ralf Mackenbach

Placement
- Final result: 1st, 121 points

Participation chronology

The Netherlands was represented at the Junior Eurovision Song Contest 2009 with the song "Click Clack", written by Jan van den Langenberg and Ralf Mackenbach, and performed by Mackenbach himself. The Dutch participating broadcaster, Algemene Vereniging Radio Omroep (AVRO), selected its entry for the contest through the Junior Songfestival 2009. The song won the contest.

== Before Junior Eurovision ==
=== Junior Songfestival 2009 ===
Algemene Vereniging Radio Omroep (AVRO) held a national final to select its entry for the Junior Eurovision Song Contest 2009. The contest consists of two semi-finals and one final. Each semi-final had 5 songs, with 2 advancing to the final: one more entry qualified to the final as a wildcard entry, allowing 5 songs to compete in the final.

The submission period for songs for the competition was from 1 February to 10 April. Over 1000 entries were received by AVRO for the contest, which were initially reduced to 100 entries. This was followed by 33 entries being selected to participate in auditions in Baarn, where the final 10 act were selected.

The names of the 10 successful entries that qualified for the live shows were released on 2 June 2009. The artists collaborated on a theme song for the competition, "Morgen is vandaag" (Tomorrow is today), which was included on the compilation CD, alongside the 10 competing songs, available in September, and was performed in both semi-finals and the final.

==== Semi-final 1 ====
Semi-final 1 – 19 September 2009
R/O	Artist	Song	Kids Jury	Expert Jury	Televote	Total	Place
1	Isaura Kuyt	"Dit is mijn kans"	7	9	7	23	5
2	Raigny Jozephia	"Verliefd"	8	10	8	26	4
3	Cheyenne Boermans & Mayleen Schoenmaker	"Druk"	10	8	9	27	3
4	Eva Neggers	"Yes We Can!"	12	7	10	29	2
5	Bram Bos	"Ik wil rocken!"	9	12	12	33	1

==== Semi-final 2 ====
Semi-final 2 – 26 September 2009
R/O	Artist	Song	Kids Jury	Expert Jury	Televote	Total	Place
1	Arletta Boland	"Laat mij nou maar"	8	7	8	23	4
2	Anne Boijmans	"Gewoon geluk"	7	8	7	22	5
3	Carlijn Andriessen & Merle Verseef	"Verboden toegang"	9	9	9	27	3
4	Eva Lugtenberg	"Gevangen in je hart"	10	10	10	30	2
5	Ralf Mackenbach	"Click Clack"	12	12	12	36	1

==== Final ====
Final – 3 October 2009
R/O	Artist	Song	Kids Jury	Expert Jury	Televote	Total	Place
1	Cheyenne Boermans & Mayleen Schoenmaker	"Druk"	7	7	7	21	5
2	Eva Neggers	"Yes We Can!"	9	9	9	27	3
3	Bram Bos	"Ik wil rocken!"	10	10	10	30	2
4	Eva Lugtenberg	"Gevangen in je hart"	8	8	8	24	4
5	Ralf Mackenbach	"Click Clack"	12	12	12	36	1

== At Junior Eurovision ==
=== Voting ===
Points awarded to the Netherlands
Score	Country
12 points (Note: All countries received one set of 12 points to ensure no country finished with nul points.)	Belgium; Romania; Sweden
10 points	Macedonia
8 points	Armenia; Cyprus; Georgia; Malta; Russia; Serbia; Ukraine
7 points	Belarus
6 points	
5 points	
4 points	
3 points	
2 points	
1 point	

Points awarded by the Netherlands
Score	Country
12 points	Belgium
10 points	Armenia
8 points	Malta
7 points	Russia
6 points	Sweden
5 points	Ukraine
4 points	Georgia
3 points	Belarus
2 points	Macedonia
1 point	Romania
