= Ralf Mackenbach =

Dutch former child singer (born 1995)

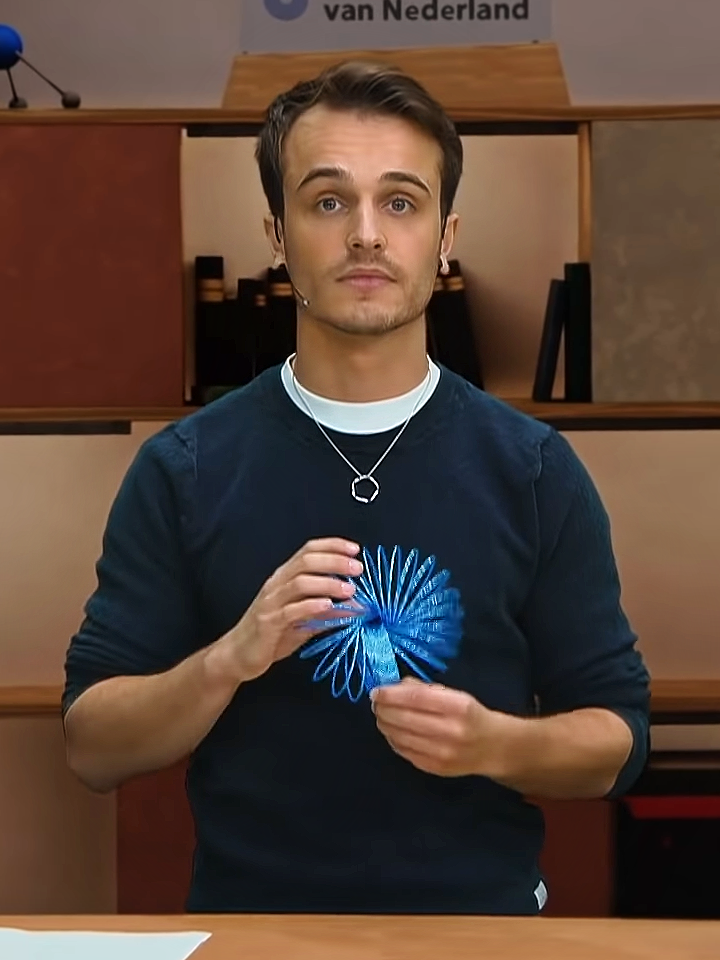
- Mackenbach in 2022
- Born: Ralf Johannes Josephus Mackenbach; 4 October 1995 (age 30); Eindhoven, Netherlands
- Occupations: Singer; dancer; actor; plasma physicist
- Musical career
- Genres: Pop music
- Instruments: Vocals; piano; drums
- Years active: 2005–present
- Scientific career
- Fields: Applied physics
- Workplaces: Eindhoven University of Technology (PhD); EPFL (postdoc)

Ralf Johannes Josephus Mackenbach (born 4 October 1995) is a Dutch plasma physicist, artist and former child singer, best known for winning the Junior Eurovision Song Contest 2009 with the song "Click Clack". He is the first and, to date, only Dutch winner of the contest.

== Early life ==
Mackenbach was born in Eindhoven, and grew up in Best, North Brabant. As a child, he starred in the musicals Tarzan and Beauty and the Beast. He attended Amsterdam's dancing academy Lucia Marthas, and studied acting at Centrum voor de Kunsten Eindhoven (CKE) in Eindhoven.

== Career ==
=== Musical career ===
In 2009, at the age of thirteen, Mackenbach won the 2009 edition of Junior Songfestival with the song "Click Clack". As a result, he represented the Netherlands in the Junior Eurovision Song Contest 2009, and went on to win the competition with 121 points. "Click Clack" peaked at number 7 in the Dutch Single Top 100. Subsequently, he appeared in the 2010, 2012 and 2022 contests as part of an interval act.

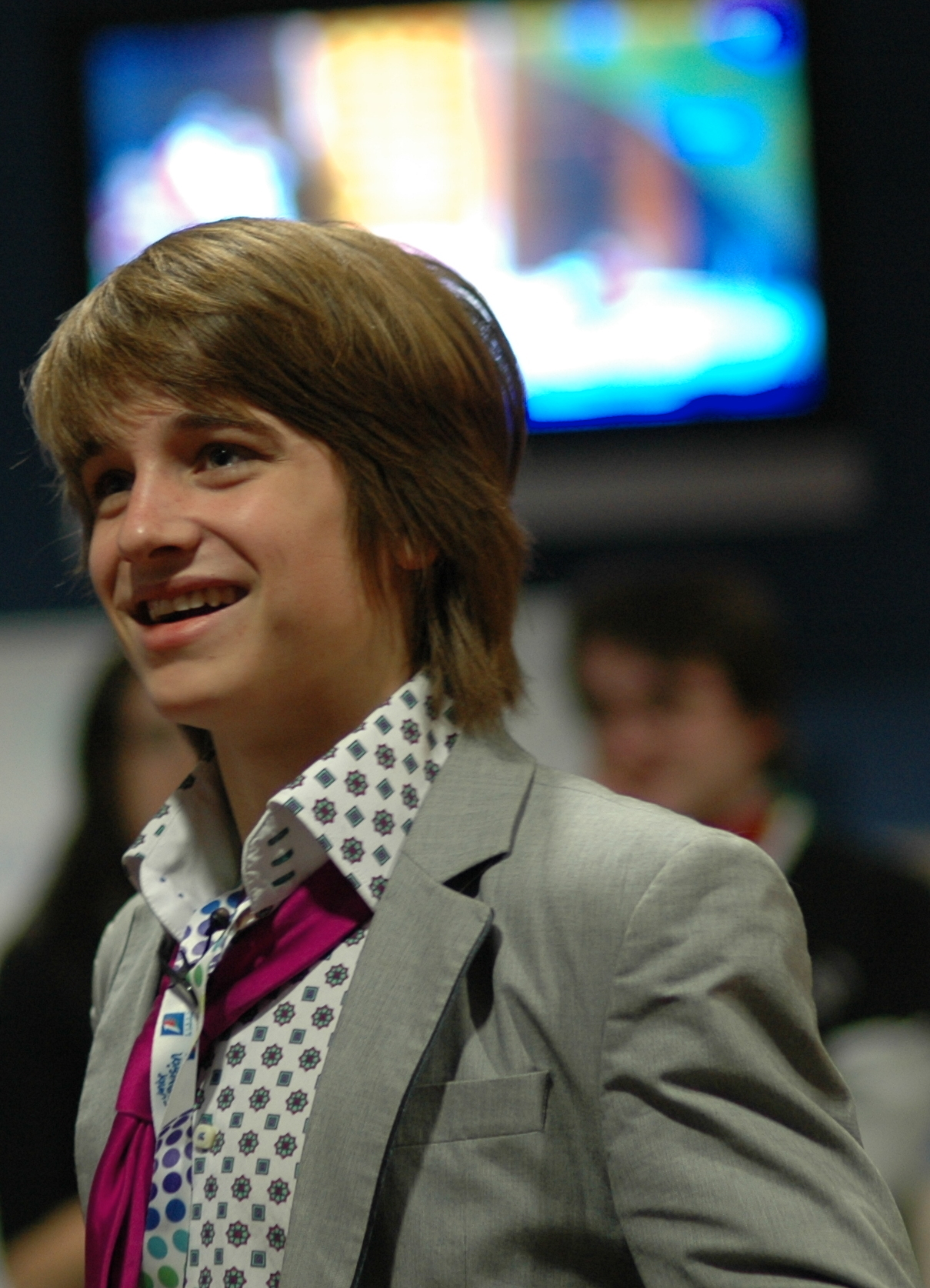
Mackenbach at the Junior Eurovision Song Contest 2010 in Minsk

Mackenbach's debut album Ralf achieved a top 10 spot in the Dutch album charts and entered the Flemish album charts at number 59. In March 2011, it achieved gold status with over 25,000 sales.

In 2011 and 2012, Mackenbach participated in the celebrity contest shows Sterren dansen op het ijs and Sterren springen op zaterdag. He was also a judge on the 2011 edition of the Dutch talent show My Name Is…. In 2019, he appeared as a judge on the Dutch adaptation of All Together Now.

=== Academic career ===
After graduating secondary school with a VWO certificate, Mackenbach studied at the Eindhoven University of Technology. In 2019, he finished a master's degree in nuclear fusion, for which he wrote the dissertation Numerical Modelling of Mode Penetration in Cylindrical Geometries Using M3D-C1.

Continuing his studies at the Eindhoven University of Technology, Mackenbach completed his PhD cum laude in November 2023 with a thesis titled Available Energy: A compass for navigating the nonlinear landscape of fusion plasma turbulence. Since 2024, he is a postdoctoral researcher at the École Polytechnique Fédérale de Lausanne (EPFL).

== Discography ==
=== Albums ===
- Ralf (2010)
- Moving On (2011)
- Seventeen (2012)

Awards and achievements
Preceded by Marissa with "1 dag"	Netherlands in the Junior Eurovision Song Contest; 2009	Succeeded by Senna and Anna with "My Family"
Preceded by (Georgia (country)) Bzikebi with "Bzz.."	Winner of the Junior Eurovision Song Contest; 2009	Succeeded by (Armenia) Vladimir Arzumanyan with "Mama"
