= Belarus in the Junior Eurovision Song Contest 2009 =

- Junior Eurovision Song Contest 2009
- Country: Belarus
- Selection process: National final
- Selection date: Semi-final; 1 June 2009; Final; September 2009

Competing entry
- Song: "Volshebniy krolik"
- Artist: Yuriy Demidovich

Placement
- Final result: 9th, 48 points

Participation chronology

Belarus competed at the Junior Eurovision Song Contest 2009, which took place in Kyiv, Ukraine. Yuriy Demidovich represented the country with the song "Volshebniy krolik".

== Before Junior Eurovision ==
=== National final ===
BTRC received a total of 63 entries to compete in the contest. On 31 March 2009, a professional jury, chaired by Vasily Rainchik, selected 17 songs to compete in the semi-final of the contest. This number was later increased to 19.

==== Semi-final ====
On 1 June 2009, (International Children's Day) the semi-final of the contest was broadcast, being prerecorded in the BTRC studio a few days earlier, and was hosted by BTRC Eurovision commentator Denis Kuryan. A professional jury, again headed by Vasily Rainchik, selected ten songs from the 19 to proceed to the final of the event.

"Belakrylyya mary" was the only song in Belarusian language in the running, while all other entries have been performed in Russian.

Semi-final – 1 June 2009
Draw	Artist	Song	Result
1	RoKi	"Tolko vperyod!" (Только вперед!)	Advanced
2	Diana Guzino	"Mechtayu letat" (Мечтаю летать)	Advanced
3	Magammed Aslanov	"Tik-Tak" (Тик-Так)	Advanced
4	Yulia Saldakaeva	"Beliy parus" (Белый парус)	Eliminated
5	Vladislav Lovgen	"Muzyka rassveta" (Музыка рассвета)	Eliminated
6	Polina Kalofati	"Supermodel"	Eliminated
7	Karamelki	"Belye ptitsy" (Белые птицы)	Eliminated
8	Yekaterina Mezhennaya	"Tolko lyubov" (Только любовь)	Advanced
9	Polina Klishkova	"Za zvezdoy" (За звездой)	Advanced
10	Anzhelik Pushnova	"Vremya tantsevat" (Время танцевать)	Eliminated
11	Maxim Petukhov	"Shkolnye Vecherinki" (Школьные вечеринки)	Eliminated
12	Yekaterina Murashko	"Den rozhdenya" (День рождения)	Advanced
13	Darya Shulgina	"Ognennye noty" (Огненные ноты)	Advanced
14	Yury Demidovich	"Volshebniy krolik" (Волшебный кролик)	Advanced
15	Alla Naimovich	"Mechtat" (Мечтать)	Eliminated
16	Lolita Karpovich	"Pro leto" (Про лето)	Eliminated
17	Zlata Larchenko	"Baba-Yaga 2009" (Баба-Яга 2009)	Advanced
18	Victoria Tsvetkova	"Belakrylyya mary" (Белакрылыя мары)	Eliminated
19	Diana Gromova	"Ey, malchishki i devchonki" (Эй, мальчишки и девчонки)	Advanced

==== Final ====
The final was held on 10 September 2009, and featured the following ten songs which qualified from the semi-final. The winner was determined by a 50/50 combination of votes from a jury made up of music professionals and regional televoting.

Final – 10 September 2009
Draw	Artist	Song	Jury	Televote	Total	Place
1	RoKi	"Tolko vperyod!"	8	5	13	4
2	Diana Guzino	"Mechtayu letat"	2	3	5	7
3	Magammed Aslanov	"Tik-Tak"	7	6	13	4
4	Yekaterina Mezhennaya	"Tolko lyubov"	4	1	5	7
5	Polina Klishkova	"Za zvezdoy"	5	10	15	3
6	Yekaterina Murashko	"Den rozhdenya"	1	4	5	7
7	Darya Shulgina	"Ognennye noty"	3	2	5	7
8	Yuriy Demidovich	"Volshebniy krolik"	12	12	24	1
9	Zlata Larchenko	"Baba-Yaga 2009"	10	8	18	2
10	Diana Gromova	"Ey, malchishki i devchonki"	6	7	13	4

Detailed Regional Televoting Results
Draw	Song	Brest	Vitebsk	Gomel	Grodno	Mogilev	Minsk	Total	Points
1	"Tolko vperyod!"	6	6	6	6	6	6	48	5
2	"Mechtayu letat"	1	2	3	10	1	1	30	3
3	"Tik-Tak"	5	5	5	12	4	5	48	6
4	"Tolko lyubov"	4	1	2	1	3	2	25	1
5	"Za zvezdoy"	7	10	7	5	12	8	61	10
6	"Den rozhdenya"	3	4	4	2	10	4	39	4
7	"Ognennye noty"	2	3	1	7	2	3	30	2
8	"Volshebniy krolik"	12	12	10	8	8	12	74	12
9	"Baba-Yaga 2009"	10	8	8	4	7	10	59	8
10	"Ey, malchishki i devchonki"	8	7	12	3	5	7	54	7
All participants automatically receive 12 points

== At Eurovision ==
=== Voting ===
Points awarded to Belarus
Score	Country
12 points (Note: All countries received one set of 12 points to ensure no country finished with nul points.)	
10 points	
8 points	
7 points	Ukraine
6 points	Macedonia; Russia
5 points	Georgia
4 points	Belgium
3 points	Netherlands; Serbia
2 points	
1 point	Armenia; Cyprus

Points awarded by Belarus
Score	Country
12 points	Russia
10 points	Ukraine
8 points	Armenia
7 points	Netherlands
6 points	Belgium
5 points	Sweden
4 points	Malta
3 points	Cyprus
2 points	Georgia
1 point	Serbia
