= Netherlands in the Junior Eurovision Song Contest =

- Junior Eurovision Song Contest
- Participating broadcaster: AVROTROS (2014–present) Formerly: AVRO (2003–2013)

Participation summary
- Appearances: 24
- First appearance: 2003
- Highest placement: 1st: 2009
- Host: 2007, 2012
- Participation history: 2003; 2004; 2005; 2006; 2007; 2008; 2009; 2010; 2011; 2012; 2013; 2014; 2015; 2016; 2017; 2018; 2019; 2020; 2021; 2022; 2023; 2024; 2025; 2026

Related articles
- Junior Songfestival
- For the most recent participation see Netherlands in the Junior Eurovision Song Contest 2026

The Netherlands has been represented in every edition of the Junior Eurovision Song Contest since its inception in 2003 and is the only country to have taken part in every edition of the contest. The Dutch participating broadcaster in the contest is AVROTROS since 2014 (formerly AVRO from 2003 to 2013), and selects its entrant through the national final Junior Songfestival. They have won the competition on one occasion; in 2009, with the song "Click Clack" by Ralf Mackenbach.

== History ==
The Netherlands are one of the sixteen countries to have made their debut at the inaugural Junior Eurovision Song Contest 2003, which took place on 15 November 2003 at the Forum in Copenhagen, Denmark.

The broadcaster AVROTROS, formerly AVRO, is responsible for the organisation of the Dutch Junior Eurovision Song Contest entry. A national final has been organised by AVRO to select the entry, called Junior Songfestival. Entrants previously wrote their own songs and sent it to the broadcaster, where a jury and the public decided the winner. Since 2016, candidates audition individually and are placed in groups later on.

As of 2025, the Netherlands has won the competition once – at the 2009 contest in Kyiv, Ukraine, Ralf Mackenbach won with the song "Click Clack" with 121 points, beating runners-up Russia and Armenia by just five points. This was the Netherlands' fifth victory at any Eurovision event, the last time being the Eurovision Song Contest 1975.

The 2007 contest was held in the Netherlands, in the venue Ahoy in Rotterdam. The 2012 contest was held in the Netherlands as well, this time in Amsterdam, making it the first country to host the Junior Eurovision Song Contest twice.

== Participation overview ==
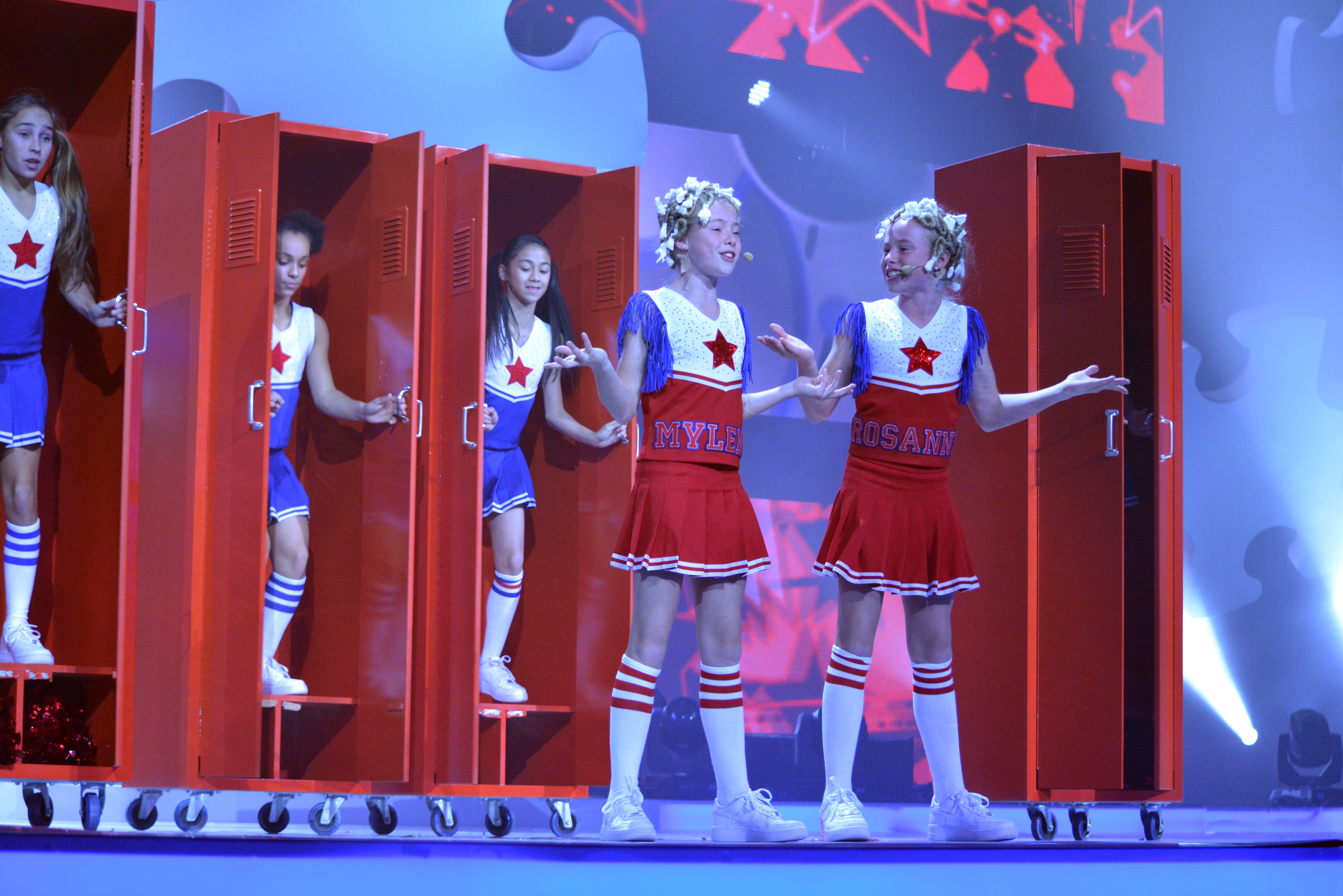
Mylène and Rosanne in Kyiv (2013)

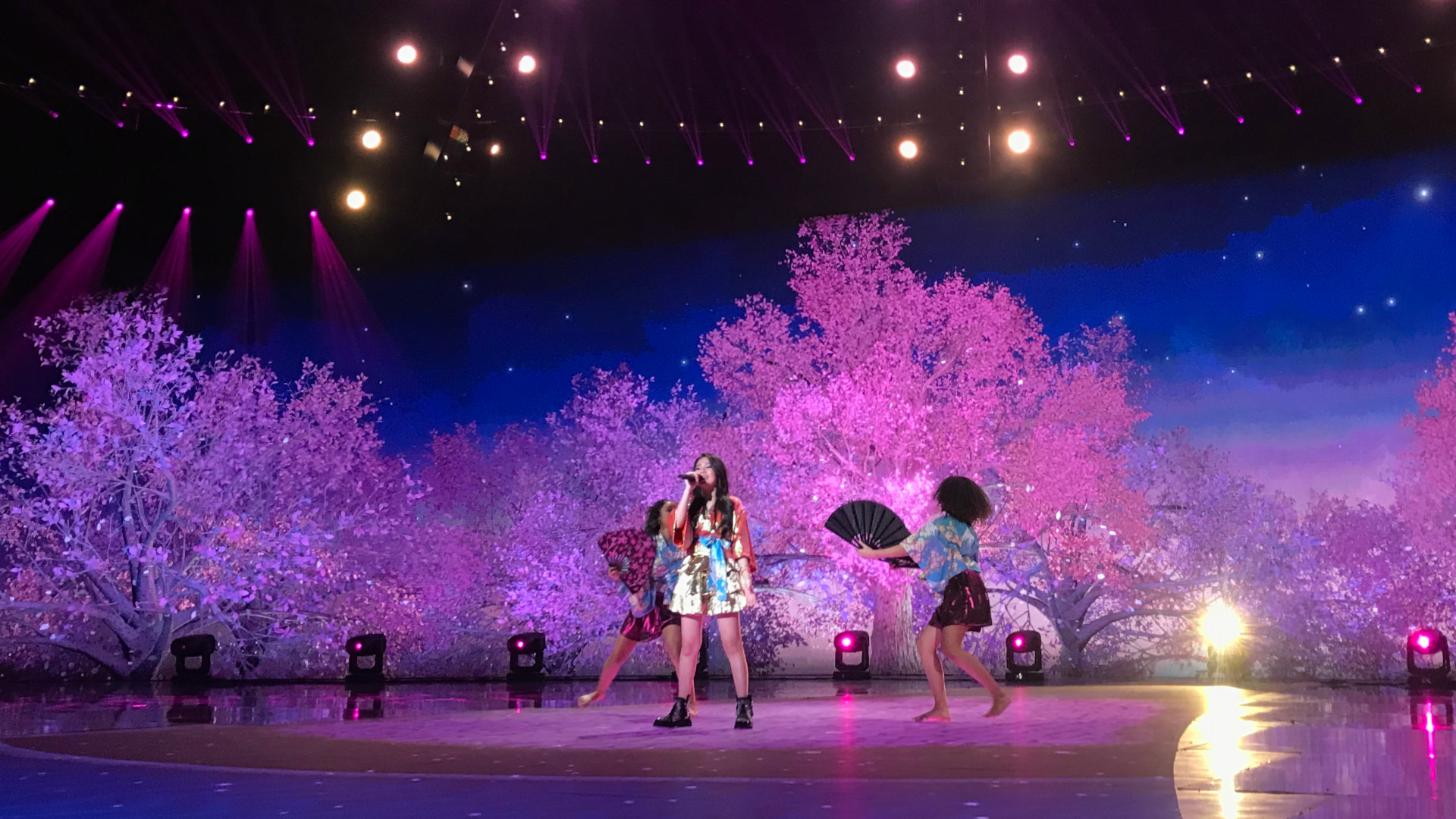
Ayana in Paris (2021)

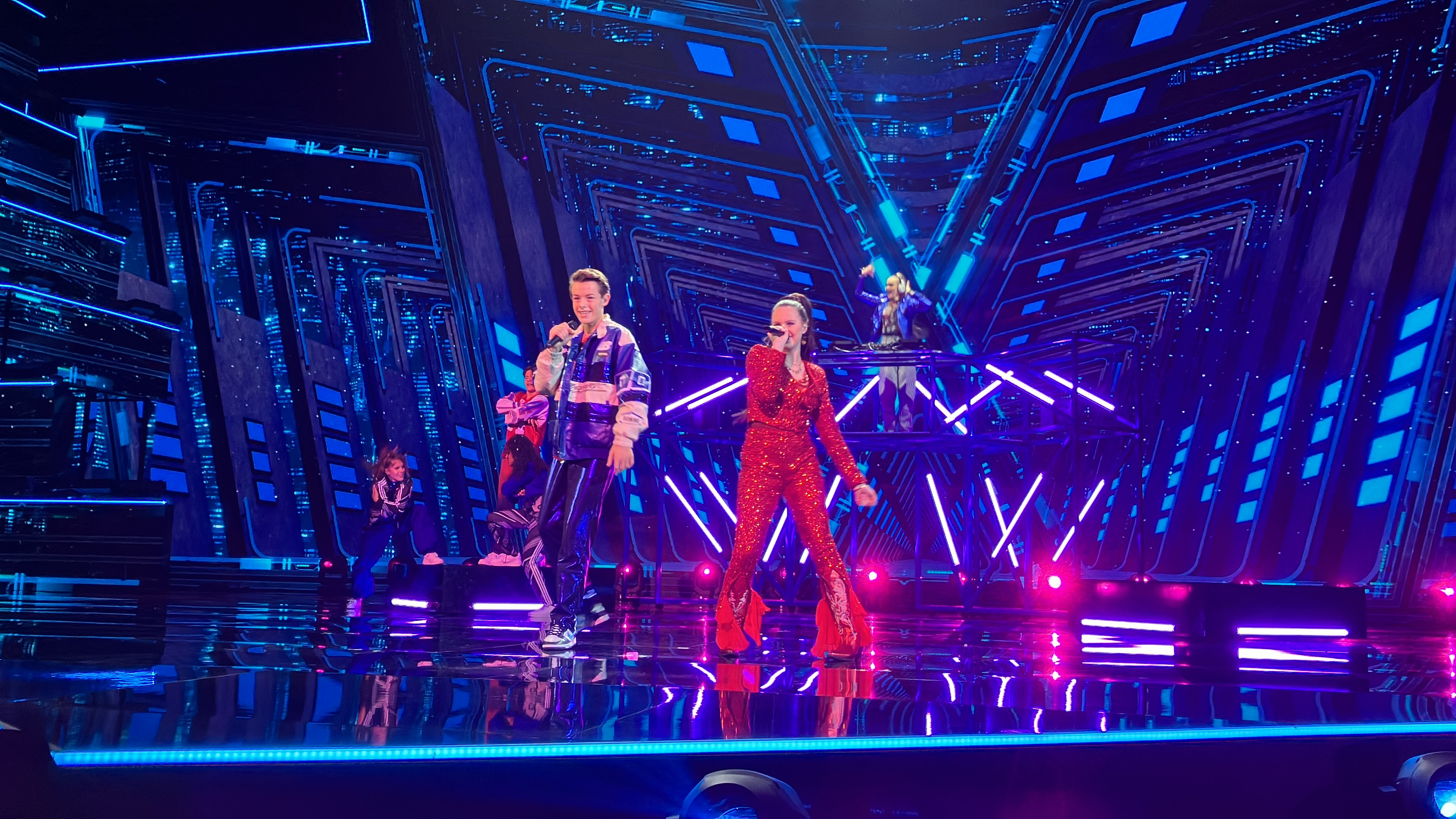
Sep and Jasmijn in Nice (2023)

Table key
1	First place
2	Second place
◁	Last place
†	Upcoming event

Year	Artist	Song	Language	Place	Points
2003	Roel	"Mijn ogen zeggen alles"	Dutch	11	23
2004	Klaartje and Nicky	"Hij is een kei"	Dutch	11	27
2005	Tess	"Stupid"	Dutch	7	82
2006	Kimberly	"Goed"	Dutch	12	44
2007	Lisa, Amy and Shelley	"Adem in, adem uit"	Dutch	11	39
2008	Marissa	"1 dag"	Dutch	13	27
2009	Ralf Mackenbach	"Click Clack"	Dutch, English	1	121
2010	Anna and Senna	"My Family"	Dutch, English	9	52
2011	Rachel	"Teenager"	Dutch	2	103
2012	Femke	"Tik tak tik"	Dutch	7	69
2013	Mylène and Rosanne	"Double Me"	Dutch, English	8	59
2014	Julia	"Around"	Dutch, English	8	70
2015	Shalisa	"Million Lights"	Dutch, English	15	35
2016	Kisses	"Kisses and Dancin'"	Dutch, English	8	174
2017	Fource	"Love Me"	Dutch, English	4	156
2018	Max and Anne	"Samen"	Dutch, English	13	91
2019	Matheu	"Dans met jou"	Dutch, English	4	186
2020	Unity	"Best Friends"	Dutch, English	4	132
2021	Ayana	"Mata Sugu Aō Ne" (またすぐ会おうね)	Dutch, English	19 ◁	43
2022	Luna	"La festa"	Dutch, English	7	128
2023	Sep and Jasmijn	"Holding On to You"	Dutch, English	7	122
2024	Stay Tuned	"Music"	Dutch, English	10	91
2025	Meadow	"Freeze"	Dutch, English	10	93
2026	Maria	"Stronger Together"	Dutch, English	8	126
2027	Confirmed intention to participate †				

== Hostings ==
Year	Location	Venue	Presenters	Executive producer	Director
2007	Rotterdam	Rotterdam Ahoy	Kim-Lian van der Meij and Sipke Jan Bousema	José van der Mark	Eduard Huis in 't Veld
2012	Amsterdam	Heineken Music Hall	Kim-Lian van der Meij and Ewout Genemans	Ronald Kok	David Grifhorst

== Commentators and spokespersons ==
The contests are broadcast online worldwide through the official Junior Eurovision Song Contest website junioreurovision.tv and YouTube. In 2015, the online broadcasts featured commentary in English by junioreurovision.tv editor Luke Fisher and 2011 Bulgarian Junior Eurovision Song Contest entrant Ivan Ivanov. The Dutch broadcaster, AVROTROS, sent their own commentator to each contest in order to provide commentary in the Dutch language. Spokespersons were also chosen by the national broadcaster in order to announce the awarding points from Netherlands. The table below list the details of each commentator and spokesperson since 2003.

Year	Broadcaster	Channel	Commentator(s)	Spokesperson	Ref.
2003	AVRO	Nederland 2	Angela Groothuizen	Aisa Renardus	
2004	AVRO	Nederland 2	Angela Groothuizen	Danny Hoekstra	
2005	AVRO	Nederland 2	Tooske Ragas	Giovanni Kemper	
2006	AVRO	Nederland 3	Sipke Jan Bousema	Tess Gaerthé	
2007	AVRO	Nederland 3	Marcel Kuijer	Kimberly Nieuwenhuizen	
2008	AVRO	Nederland 3	Sipke Jan Bousema	Famke Rauch	
2009	AVRO	Nederland 3	Sipke Jan Bousema	Marissa Grasdijk	
2010	AVRO	Nederland 3	Sipke Jan Bousema	Bram Bos	
2011	AVRO	Nederland 3	Marcel Kuijer	Anna Lagerweij	
2012	AVRO	Nederland 1	Marcel Kuijer	Lidewei Loot	
2013	AVRO	Nederland 3	Marcel Kuijer	Alessandro Wempe	
2014	AVROTROS	NPO 3 (Zapp)	Jan Smit	Mylène and Rosanne	
2015	AVROTROS	NPO 3 (Zapp)	Jan Smit	Julia van Bergen	
2016	AVROTROS	NPO 3 (Zapp)	Jan Smit	Anneloes	
2017	AVROTROS	NPO 3 (Zapp)	Jan Smit	Thijs Schlimback	
2018	AVROTROS	NPO 3 (Zapp)	Jan Smit	Vincent Miranovich	
2019	AVROTROS	NPO 3 (Zapp)	Buddy Vedder	Anne Buhre	
2020	AVROTROS	NPO 3 (Zapp)	Jan Smit	Robin de Haas	
2021	AVROTROS	NPO 3 (Zapp)	Buddy Vedder	Matheu Hinzen	
2022	AVROTROS	NPO 3 (Zapp)	Bart Arens and Matheu Hinzen	Ralf Mackenbach	
2023	AVROTROS	NPO 3 (Zapp)	Bart Arens and Matheu Hinzen	Luna Sabella	
2024	AVROTROS	NPO 2 Extra, NPO 3 (Zapp) (Note: The contest was broadcast in full on NPO 2 Extra, and partially on NPO 3, starting at 18:30 CET during France's performance and interrupted at 19:00 for a broadcast of NOS Jeugdjournaal before resuming during Ukraine's performance.)	Bart Arens and Matheu Hinzen	Veronika Morska	
2025	AVROTROS	NPO 3 (Zapp)	Bart Arens and Matheu Hinzen	Luna Sabella	
2026	AVROTROS	NPO 3 (Zapp)	Rob Janssen and Matheu Hinzen	Meadow Isselt	

== See also ==
- Junior Songfestival – the competition organised by AVROTROS to select the entrant for the Junior Eurovision Song Contest.
- Netherlands in the Eurovision Song Contest – adult version of the Junior Eurovision Song Contest.
