= Georgia in the Junior Eurovision Song Contest 2009 =

- Junior Eurovision Song Contest 2009
- Country: Georgia
- Selection process: National Final
- Selection date: 26 September 2009

Competing entry
- Song: "Lurji prinveli"
- Artist: Princesses

Placement
- Final result: 6th, 68 points

Participation chronology

Georgia, winners of Junior Eurovision Song Contest 2008, competed in the Junior Eurovision Song Contest 2009, held in Kyiv, Ukraine. GPB held a national final to select the Georgian entry, chosen from 10 competing entries.

== Before Junior Eurovision ==
=== National final ===
From the 500 applications sent into GPB, 10 acts were selected to compete in the national final, to be held on 26 September 2009. The 10 competing acts consisted of individual acts, along with specially-formed groups created by GPB from individual entries.

The ten acts also took part in a national tour, where, they performed in various towns around Georgia over a monthly period before the national final.

Final – 26 September 2009
Draw	Artist	Song
1	Linda Adamia	"Emo simghera" (ემო სიმღერა)
2	Shatalo	"Chven ak vart" (ჩვენ აქ ვართ)
3	Bibidi-Babidi	"Muskompoti" (მუსკომპოტი)
4	Nini-Mari	"Orero-rera" (ორერო-რერა)
5	Jorjadze Family	"5 gogo da 1 bichi" (5 გოგო და 1 ბიჭი)
6	Polki	"Sakhaliso" (სახალისო)
7	Princesses	"Lurji prinveli" (ლურჯი ფრინველი)
8	Dzmebi Gurulebi	"Dzama Evrovizia?!" (ძამა ევროვიზია?!)
9	Khma Sakartvelodan	"Mkhiaruli samqaro" (მხიარული სამყარო)
10	Sami Mari	"Chven" (ჩვენ)

== At Eurovision ==
=== Voting ===
Points awarded to Georgia
Score	Country
12 points (Note: All countries received one set of 12 points to ensure no country finished with nul points.)	
10 points	Malta
8 points	
7 points	Cyprus; Romania
6 points	Armenia; Ukraine
5 points	Belgium; Russia
4 points	Netherlands
3 points	Sweden
2 points	Belarus
1 point	Serbia

Points awarded by Georgia
Score	Country
12 points	Armenia
10 points	Ukraine
8 points	Netherlands
7 points	Russia
6 points	Belgium
5 points	Belarus
4 points	Malta
3 points	Sweden
2 points	Serbia
1 point	Cyprus
