= Junior Songfestival =

Annual Dutch song competition

- History of logos
- Also known as: JSF
- Genre: Music competition
- Country of origin: Netherlands
- No. of seasons: 23 editions
- No. of episodes: 46

Original release
- Network: AVRO (2003–2013); AVROTROS (2014–present)
- Release: 20 September 2003 – present

Related
- Junior Eurovision Song Contest (2003–present); Nationaal Songfestival (1956–2012)

Junior Songfestival (Dutch pronunciation: [ˈjynijɔr ˈsɔŋfɛstiˌvɑl]) is a Dutch televised music competition for children, held annually since 2003. It is the children's version of the Nationaal Songfestival. The winner of the contest goes on to represent the Netherlands in the Junior Eurovision Song Contest (Dutch: Junior Eurovisiesongfestival), an international version of the competition.

== History ==
The first edition was organised in 2003 by Dutch broadcaster AVRO (which later became AVROTROS). Kids of age 8 through 15 wrote their own songs and sent the recordings to the Dutch broadcaster, nine entries advanced to the televised final. From 2004 until 2015, the candidates also sang a common song that did not compete, and (with the exception of 2006) the show also consisted of two televised semi-finals.

In 2006, the television programme won the Gouden Stuiver (English: Golden Nickle), a Dutch award for children's television.

In 2016, there was no televised show; the entrant for that year's Junior Eurovision Song Contest was selected internally. Also, since that year the auditors no longer need to submit original songs. The show returned in 2017 with semi-finals, but the finalists sang covers instead of original songs. Since 2018, there are no semi-finals and the competing songs are written by established songwriting teams and assigned to the participants divided into four acts.

== Editions ==
Year	Date of final	Venue	Presenter(s)	Common song	Ref.
2003	20 September	Pepsi Stage, Amsterdam	Angela Groothuizen	No common song	
2004	1 October	Pepsi Stage, Amsterdam	Angela Groothuizen	"Wij gaan ervoor"	
2005	24 September	Central Studios, Utrecht	Tooske Ragas	"Alles wat ik wil"	
2006	30 September	Studio 24, Hilversum	Sipke Jan Bousema	"Vrij"	
2007	6 October	Studio Baarn, Baarn	Sipke Jan Bousema	"Laat ons zijn wie we zijn"	
2008	4 October	Studio Baarn, Baarn	Sipke Jan Bousema	"Ojee ojee"	
2009	3 October	Studio Baarn, Baarn	Sipke Jan Bousema	"Morgen is vandaag"	
2010	2 October	Studio Baarn, Baarn	Ewout Genemans	"Famous"	
2011	1 October	Studio 1, Aalsmeer	Ewout Genemans	"Yeah! Yeah!"	
2012	6 October	Studio 1, Aalsmeer	Ewout Genemans	"JSF Party"	
2013	28 September	Studio 1, Aalsmeer	Ewout Genemans	"Glitter en glamour"	
2014	4 October	Studio 1, Aalsmeer	Jan Smit	"Connected"	
2015	3 October	Studio 1, Aalsmeer	Jan Smit	"Living Our Dream"	
2017	16 September	Theater Hanzehof, Zutphen	Romy Monteiro	"Later als ik groter ben"	
2018	29 September	Theater Hanzehof, Zutphen	Romy Monteiro	No common song	
2019	28 September	Theater Hanzehof, Zutphen	Romy Monteiro and Buddy Vedder	"Stars to Shine"	
2020	26 September	Rotterdam Ahoy, Rotterdam	Romy Monteiro and Buddy Vedder	"All We Need Is Music"	
2021	25 September	Rotterdam Ahoy, Rotterdam	Romy Monteiro and Buddy Vedder	"Let's Sing Together"	
2022	24 September	Rotterdam Ahoy, Rotterdam	Stefania and Matheu Hinzen	"Living in the Moment"	
2023	23 September	Rotterdam Ahoy, Rotterdam	Stefania and Matheu Hinzen	"Good Vibes"	
2024	21 September	Rotterdam Ahoy, Rotterdam	Stefania and Matheu Hinzen	"Move On"	
2025	20 September	Rotterdam Ahoy, Rotterdam	Stefania and Matheu Hinzen	"Spotlights" (Note: An anthem of the anti-bullying campaign Stip It titled "We Got the Power" was also performed during the show.)	
2026	19 September	Rotterdam Ahoy, Rotterdam	Stefania and Matheu Hinzen	"Make It Happen" (Note: An anthem of the anti-bullying campaign Stip It titled "Stop Right Now" was also performed during the show.)	

=== Winners ===
Table key
1	Winner
2	Second place
◁	Last place

Year	Artist	Song	Songwriter(s)	Points	JESC
2003	Roel	"Mijn ogen zeggen alles"	Roel Felius	118	11
2004	Klaartje & Nicky	"Hij is een kei"	Klaartje Meulenmeester; Nicky Bruyn	32	11
2005	Tess	"Stupid"	Tess Gaerthé	36	7
2006	Kimberly	"Goed"	Kimberly Nieuwenhuis	30	12
2007	Lisa, Amy & Shelley	"Adem in, adem uit"	Lisa Vol; Amy Vol; Shelley Vol	36	11
2008	Marissa	"1 dag"	Marissa Grasdijk	34	13
2009	Ralf	"Click Clack"	Ralf Mackenbach; Jan van den Langenberg	36	1
2010	Anna & Senna	"My Family"	Anna Lagerweij; Senna Sitalsing; Tjeerd Oosterhuis	32	9
2011	Rachel	"Ik ben een teenager"	Rachel Traets; William Laseroms; Maarten ten Hove; Joachim Vermeulen Windsant	36	2
2012	Femke	"Tik tak tik"	Femke Meines; Tjeerd Oosterhuis	31	7
2013	Mylène & Rosanne	"Double Me"	Mylène Waalewijn; Rosanne Waalewijn; Tjeerd Oosterhuis	33	8
2014	Julia	"Around"	Julia van Bergen; Robert Dorn; Joost Griffioen	36	8
2015	Shalisa	"Million Lights"	Shalisa van der Laan; Hans Tomassen; Joost Griffioen	36	15
2017	Fource	N/A (Note: The 2017 edition did not feature original songs.)		—	4
2018	Max & Anne	"Samen"	Babette Labeij; Dimitri Veltkamp; Robin van Veen	34	13
2019	Matheu	"Dans met jou"	Jermain van der Bogt; Willem Laseroms	36	4
2020	Unity	"Best Friends"	Robert Dorn	34	4
2021	Ayana	"Mata Sugu Aō Ne" (またすぐ会おうね)	Ferry Lagendijk	33	19 ◁
2022	Luna	"La festa"	Robert Dorn	36	7
2023	Sep & Jasmijn	"Holding On to You"	Robert Dorn	36	7
2024	Stay Tuned	"Music"	Jermain van der Bogt; Willem Laseroms	34	10
2025	Meadow	"Freeze"	Daniël van der Molen; Elke Tiel; Stas Swaczyna	36	10
2026	Maria	"Stronger Together"	Mell Jonk; Ton Dijkman	31	8

=== Jury members ===
The winner is determined by three sets of points; one given by a professional jury, one by a kids jury, and one by public voting. The following table lists the members of the professional jury in the final:

2003	2004	2005	2006	2007	2008
Jamai Loman; Bastiaan Ragas; Birgit Schuurman; Sylvana Simons; Gijs Staverman	Manuela Kemp; Sander Lantinga; Jeroen Kijk in de Vegte; Kim-Lian van der Meij	René Froger; Manuela Kemp; Sander Lantinga; Kim-Lian van der Meij	Gerard Ekdom; Simone Kleinsma; Sita	Gordon; Nikkie Plessen; Yes-R	Curt Fortin; Gordon; Hind
2009	2010	2011	2012	2013	2014
Jeroen van der Boom; Yolanthe Cabau; Lange Frans	Jamai Loman; Stacey Rookhuizen; Yes-R	Lieke van Lexmond; Stacey Rookhuizen; Ruud de Wild	Ferry Doedens; John Ewbank; Lieke van Lexmond	Brownie Dutch; Tim Douwsma; Katja Schuurman	Xander de Buisonjé; Yvonne Coldeweijer; Niels Geusebroek
2015	2017	2018	2019	2020	2021
Gerard Joling; Leona Philippo; Yes-R	Sharon Doorson; Tim Douwsma; Kim-Lian van der Meij	Tommie Christiaan; Maan; Buddy Vedder	Tabitha; Edsilia Rombley; Kaj van der Voort	Ronnie Flex; Duncan Laurence; Fenna Ramos (Note: Ramos replaced Emma Heesters, who had been in contact with a person who tested positive for COVID-19.)	Emma Heesters; Jeangu Macrooy; Rolf Sanchez
2022	2023	2024	2025	2026	
Glen Faria; Flemming; Chantal Janzen	Sosha Duysker; Soy Kroon; Meau	Anne Appelo; Jim Bakkum; Roxeanne Hazes	Billy Dans; Hannah Mae; Sera	Berget Lewis; Kris Kross Amsterdam; Numidia	

== See also ==
- Netherlands in the Junior Eurovision Song Contest
- Melodi Grand Prix Junior
- MGP Junior (Danish TV series)
- Lilla Melodifestivalen
