= Sara Markoska =

Macedonian singer (born 1995)

- Born: Sara Markoska; 27 June 1995 (age 31); Skopje, Republic of Macedonia (present-day North Macedonia)
- Genre: Pop
- Occupations: Singer, songwriter, UGC Creator
- Years active: 2006–present
- Website: https://www.saramarkoska.com

Sara Markoska (Macedonian: Сара Маркоска; born 27 June 1995) is a Macedonian singer. She represented North Macedonia in the Junior Eurovision Song Contest 2009 with the song "Za ljubovta" (За љубовта), ranking 12th with 31 points.

== Career ==
Markoska lives in Skopje, North Macedonia. She went to the eight grade at an elementary school and was an excellent student. When the new school building was built, she had the honour to sing the new school anthem. She went to music school and took private singing lessons with professor Vlado Srbinovski as well.

=== 2006: Begins her career – Stars ===
Markoska performed at the international festival Zvezdichkiy (Stars), and won the third place for interpretation of the song Cama Niz Cahara (Through Sahara On My Own).

=== 2007–2008: First attempt for the Junior Eurovision Song Contest and participation in other festivals ===
Sara participated in the Macedonian national selection for the Junior Eurovision Song Contest 2007 and came in second with the song "Mislish Na Mene" (You Think Of Me). Afterwards she was asked to join the team performing in Rotterdam as a backing vocalist and dancer. She has been to Ukraine at two festivals. At the Music Umbrella festival in Vinnytsia, and in 2008, at a festival in Mariupol. 2008 was very successful for her. She has taken part in many festivals and humanitarian concerts. She was noticed and accepted, and met many children from Macedonia and other countries.

=== 2009–present: Junior Eurovision Song Contest 2009 ===
She performed in Nesebar, Bulgaria, where she took part in the Sun, Joy and Beauty festival and took the 3rd place between of 78 participants, with the song "Time will tell us". She was looking forward to visiting Ukraine once again, but this time to represent Macedonia at the Junior Eurovision Song Contest 2009 with the song "Za Ljubovta" (For Love) which she wrote herself. She came 12th place with 31 points. In 2010 she went to a Spanish festival where she won with the song "In love there is time". In 2011, Sara competed in a show called "M2–Searching for a Star" with the song "No Shame" where she won and then she sang the same song in the Baltic Song Festival in Sweden passing to the finals. In 2012 Sara participated in the Makfest 2012 with the song Posle Nego and she got the grand prize and the Best Newcomer award.

== Discography ==
=== Singles ===
- "Mizlich Na Menye" (2008)
- "Time will tell us" (2009)
- "Za ljubovta" (2009–participated in Junior Eurovision Song Contest 2009 with it)
- "In love there is time" (2010)
- "No Shame" (2011)
- "Bez Sram" (2011)
- "Posle Nego" (2012)
- "Private Show" (2014)

Awards and achievements
Preceded by Bobby Andonov with "Prati mi SMS"	North Macedonia in the Junior Eurovision Song Contest; 2009	Succeeded by Anja Veterova with "Eooo, Eooo"
