= Ekaterina Ryabova (singer) =

Russian singer (born 1997)

Ekaterina Ryabova Екатерина Рябова
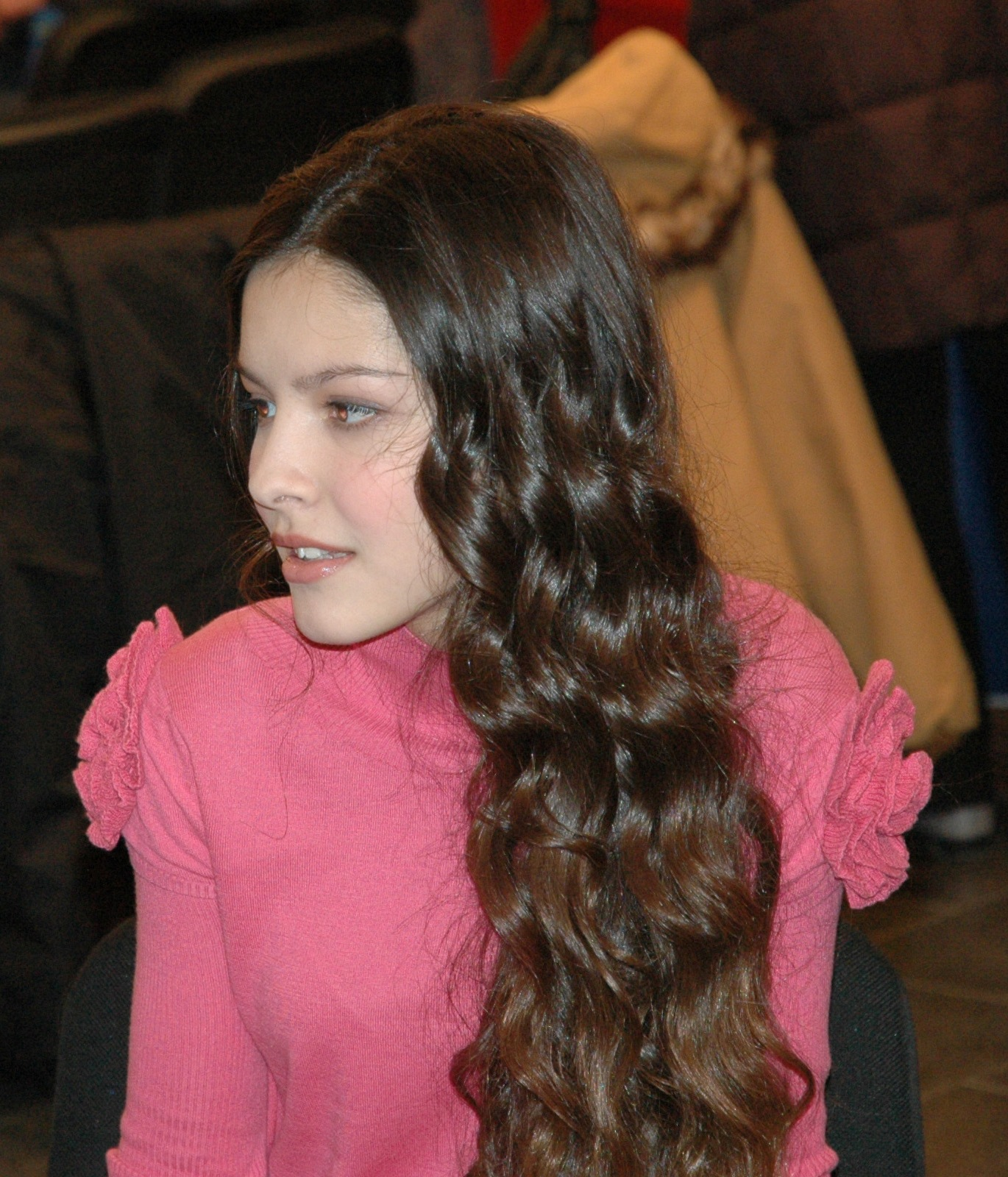
- Ekaterina Ryabova. JESC 2011

Background information
- Also known as: Katya Ryabova
- Born: Ekaterina Dmitrievna Ryabova; 4 August 1997 (age 29); Shchyolkovo, Russia
- Genres: Pop rock, teen pop, pop, dance-pop
- Occupation: Singer
- Instrument: Vocals
- Years active: 2007–present
- Website: http://ryabovakatya.com/

Ekaterina Dmitrievna "Katya" Ryabova (Russian: Екатерина Дмитриевна "Катя" Рябова, born 4 August 1997) is a Russian singer. She is from Shchyolkovo, but now resides in Yubileyny.

== Career ==
She was selected to represent her country in the Junior Eurovision Song Contest 2009 with the song Malenkiy Prints (The Little Prince). At the contest on 21 November in Kyiv, she got third place with Luara Hayrapetyan from Armenia placing second after Armenia received 3 twelves and Russia 2. In 2011, she became the first returning artist in Junior Eurovision history, representing Russia again with the song Kak Romeo i Dzhulyetta (Like Romeo and Juliet), finishing in fourth place.

Awards and achievements
| Preceded by Mikhail Puntov with "Spit angel" | Russia in the Junior Eurovision Song Contest; 2009 | Succeeded by Liza Drozd and Sasha Lazin with "Boy and girl" |
| Preceded by Liza Drozd and Sasha Lazin with "Boy and Girl" | Russia in the Junior Eurovision Song Contest; 2011 | Succeeded by Lerika with "Sensation" |
