= Russia in the Junior Eurovision Song Contest =

- Junior Eurovision Song Contest
- Participating broadcaster: RTR

Participation summary
- Appearances: 17
- First appearance: 2005
- Last appearance: 2021
- Highest placement: 1st: 2006, 2017
- Participation history: 2005; 2006; 2007; 2008; 2009; 2010; 2011; 2012; 2013; 2014; 2015; 2016; 2017; 2018; 2019; 2020; 2021; 2022 – 2025
- For the most recent participation see Russia in the Junior Eurovision Song Contest 2021

Russia was represented at the Junior Eurovision Song Contest for the first time in 2005. The Russian participating broadcaster in the contest was All-Russia State Television and Radio Broadcasting Company (RTR). Its first win came in 2006, with "Vesenniy jazz" by Tolmachevy Twins. Its second win came in 2017, with "Wings" by Polina Bogusevich. Its worst result to date has been achieved with the song "A Time for Us" by Tanya Mezhentseva and Denberel Oorzhak in 2019 where it placed 13th.

RTR has represented Russia at the Junior Eurovision Song Contest. The broadcaster has selected Ekaterina Ryabova to represent Russia at the Junior Eurovision Song Contest 2009 in Kyiv with the song "Malenkiy prints". Ryabova represented Russia once again in 2011 with the song "Kak Romeo i Dzhulyetta", therefore becoming the first returning artist in the history of the Junior Eurovision Song Contest.

Russia had initially confirmed their participation in the 2022 contest, however on 26 February 2022, the Russian broadcasters VGTRK and Channel One Russia had their EBU memberships suspended after the country was excluded from participating in the regular Eurovision Song Contest due to the Russian invasion of Ukraine, thus being excluded from Junior Eurovision in 2022 and beyond.

== Participation overview ==
Here is a list of all and songs and their respective performers that have represented Russia in the contest:

Table key
1	First place
2	Second place
3	Third place

Year	Artist	Song	Language	Place	Points
2005	Vladislav Krutskikh	"Doroga k solntsu" (Дорога к солнцу)	Russian	9	66
2006	Tolmachevy Twins	"Vesenniy jazz" (Весенний джаз)	Russian	1	154
2007	Alexandra Golovchenko	"Otlichnitsa" (Отличница)	Russian	6	105
2008	Mikhail Puntov	"Spit angel" (Спит ангел)	Russian	7	73
2009	Ekaterina Ryabova	"Malenkiy prints" (Маленький принц)	Russian	3	116
2010	Liza Drozd and Sasha Lazin	"Boy and Girl"	Russian, English	2	119
2011	Katya Ryabova	"Romeo and Juliet"	Russian	4	99
2012	Lerika	"Sensation"	Russian, English	4	88
2013	Dayana Kirillova	"Dream On"	Russian	4	106
2014	Alisa Kozhikina	"Dreamer"	Russian, English	5	96
2015	Mikhail Smirnov	"Mechta (Dream)" (Мечта)	Russian, English	6	80
2016	The Water of Life Project	"Water of Life"	Russian, English	4	202
2017	Polina Bogusevich	"Wings"	Russian, English	1	188
2018	Anna Filipchuk	"Unbreakable"	Russian, English	10	122
2019	Tatyana Mezhentseva and Denberel Oorzhak	"A Time for Us"	Russian, English	13	72
2020	Sofia Feskova	"My New Day"	Russian, English	10	88
2021	Tanya Mezhentseva	"Mon ami"	Russian, English (Note: Contains two phrases in French)	7	124

=== Gallery ===
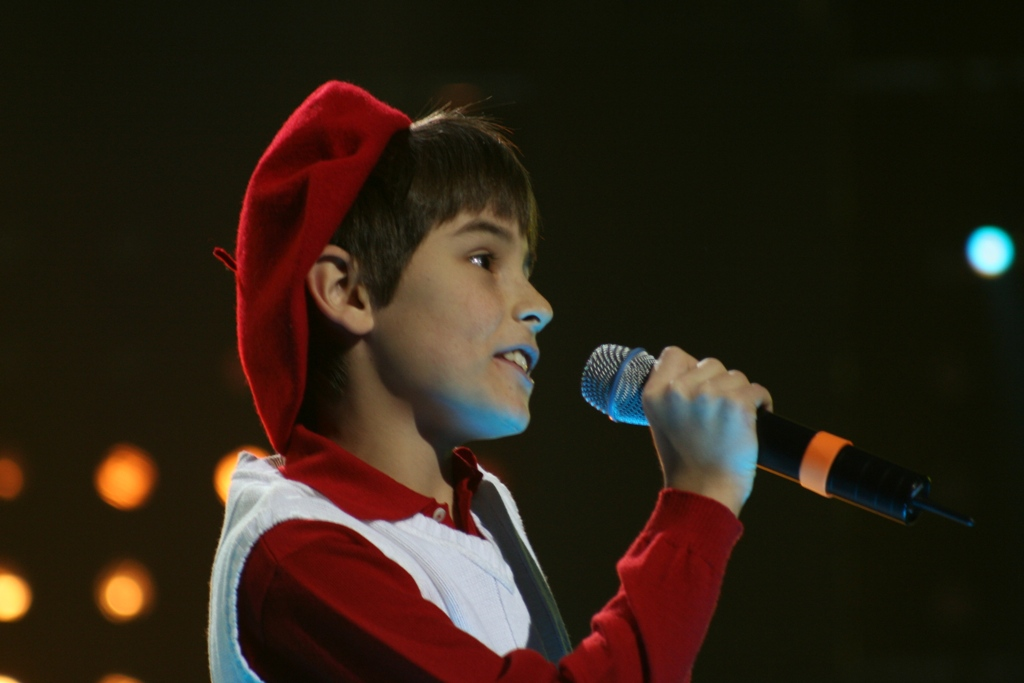
Vladislav Krutskikh in Hasselt (2005)

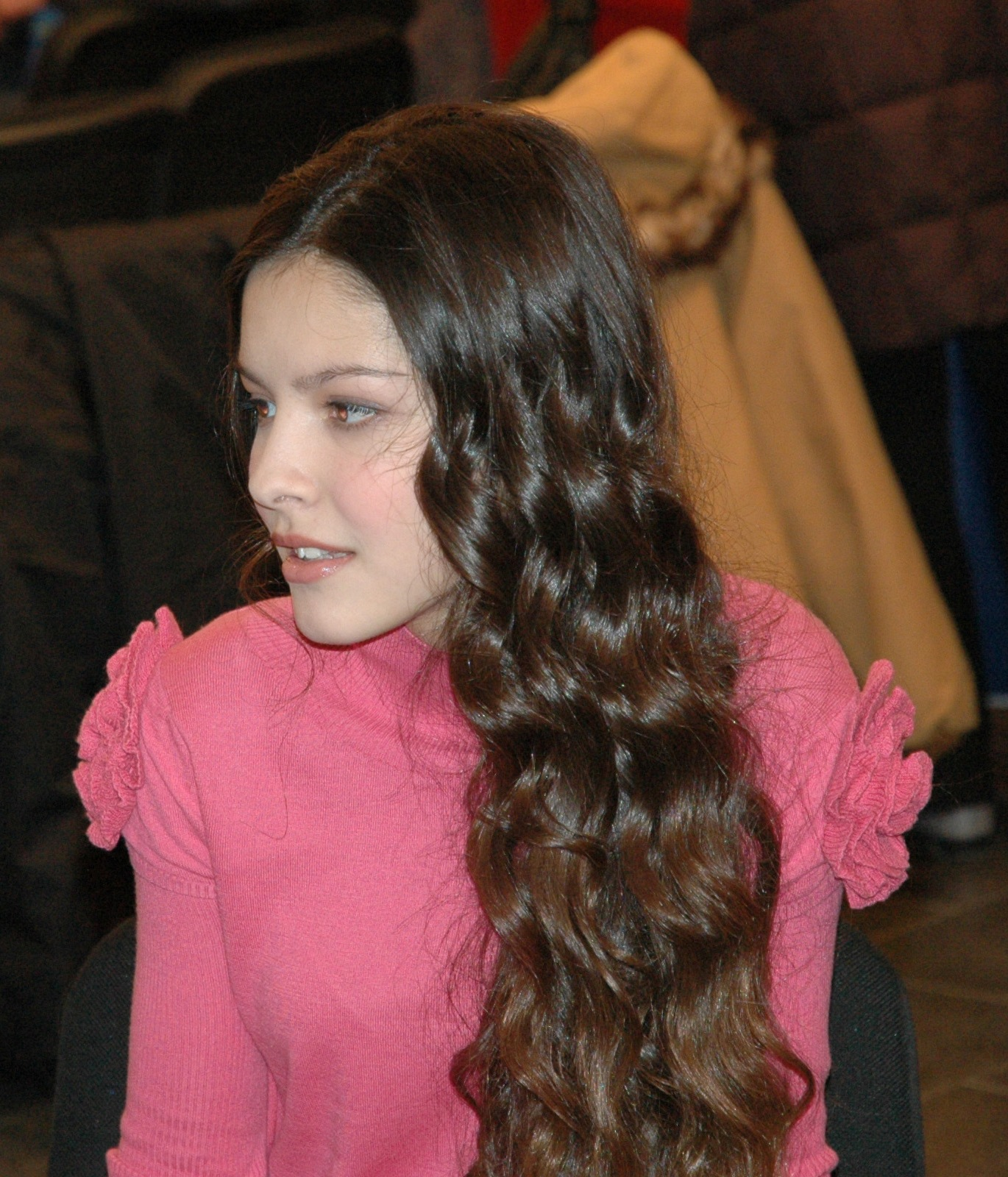
Ekaterina Ryabova in Yerevan (2011)

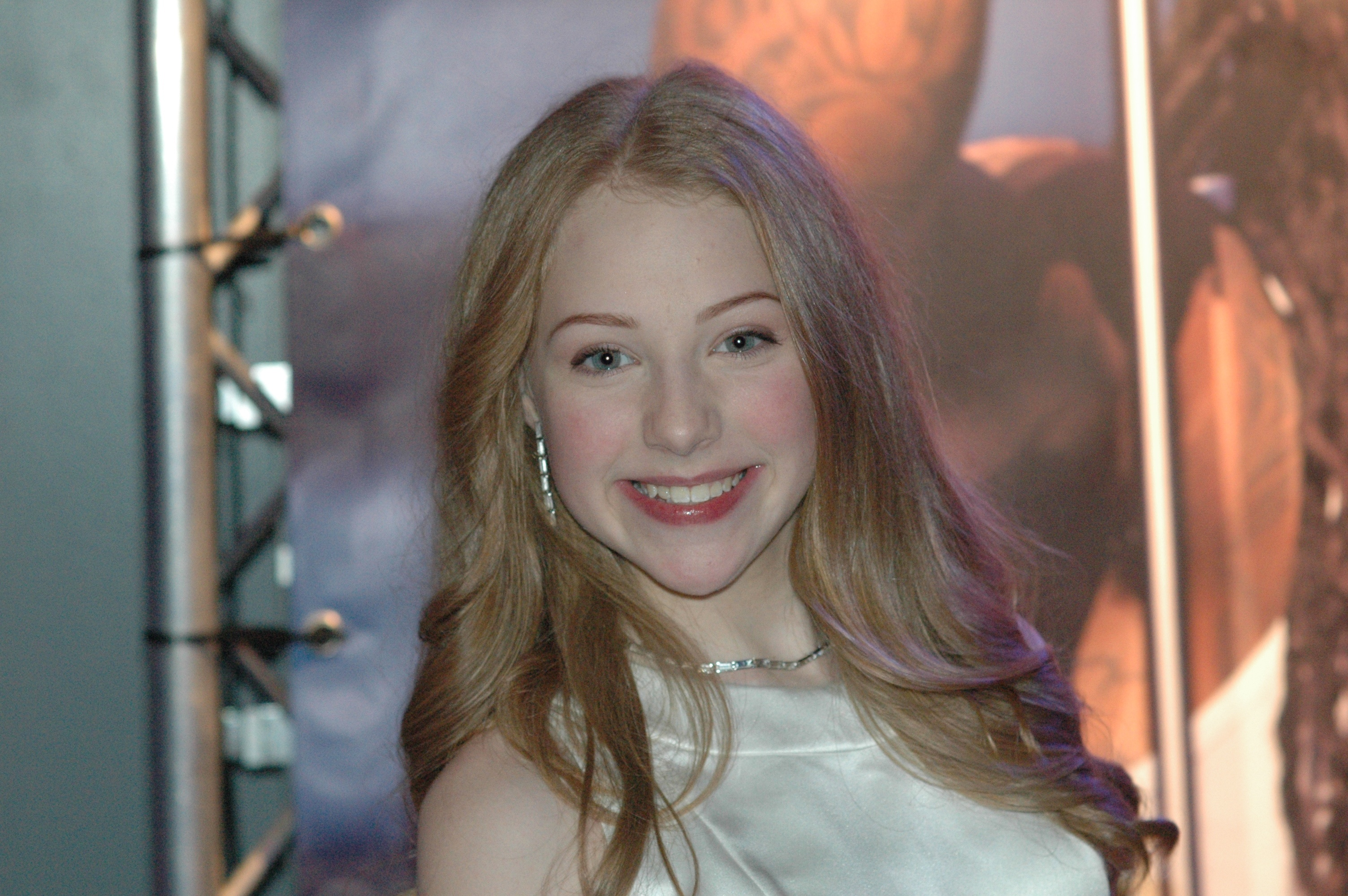
Lerika in Amsterdam (2012)

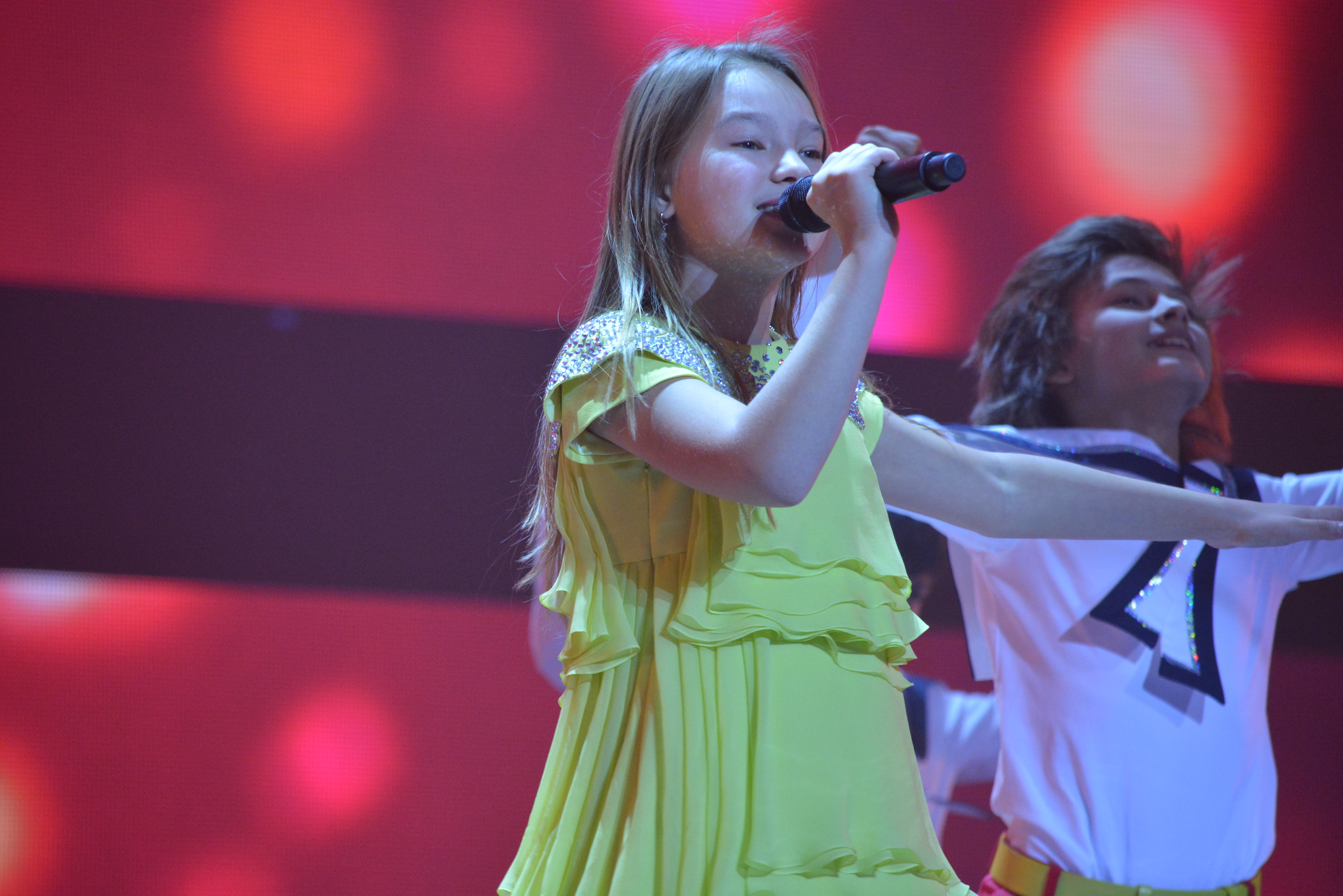
Dayana Kirillova in Kyiv (2013)

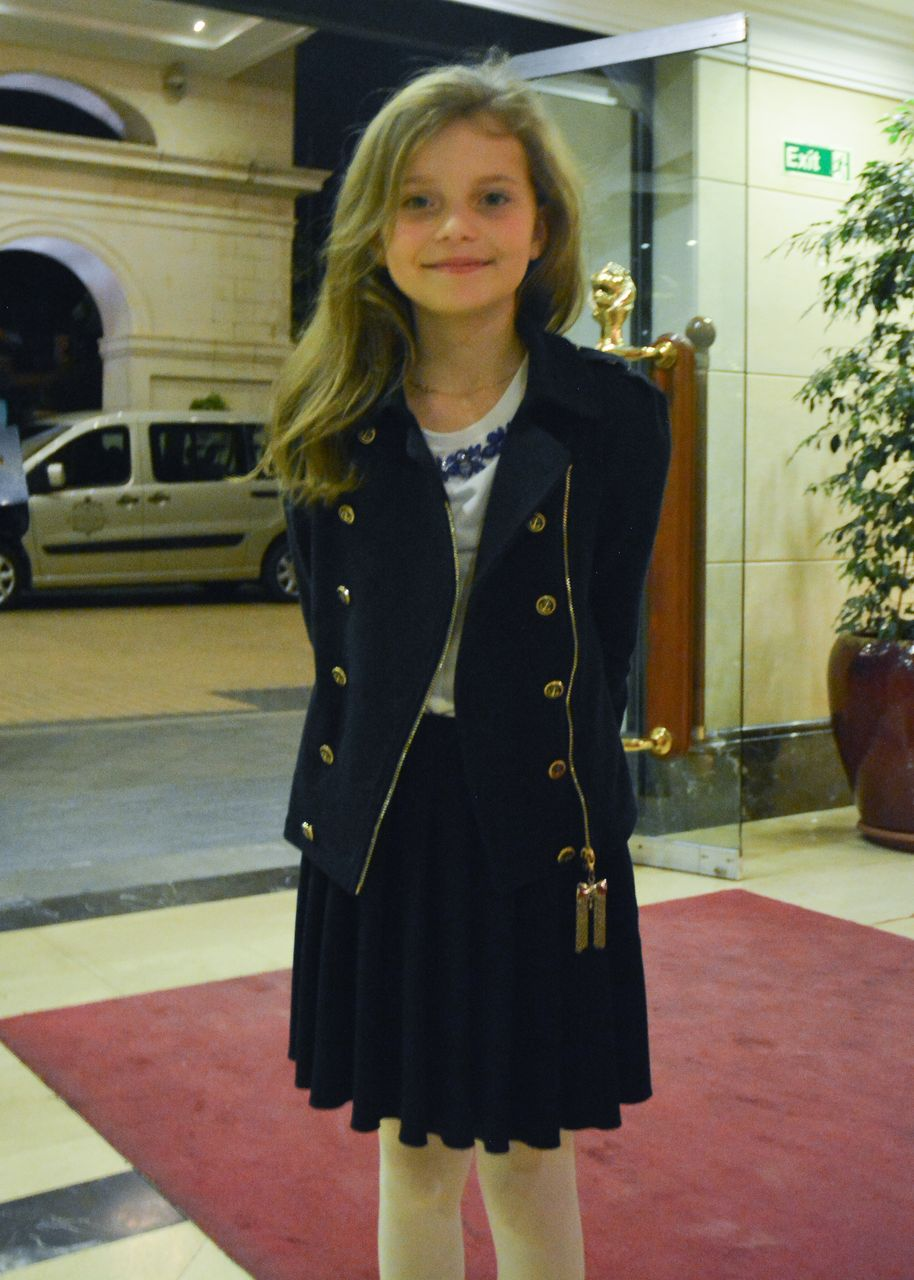
Alisa Kozhikina in Malta (2014)

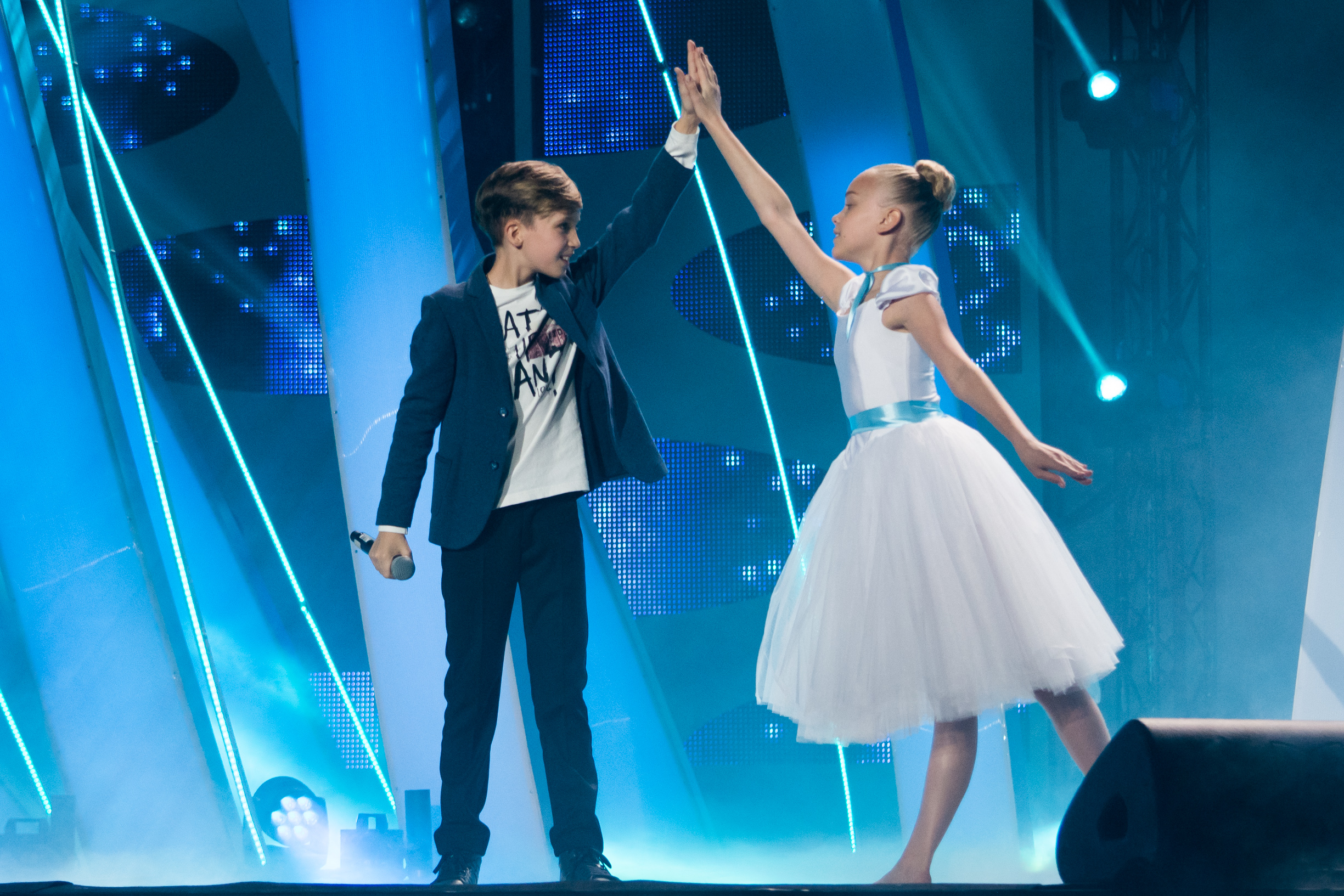
Mikhail Smirnov in Sofia (2015)

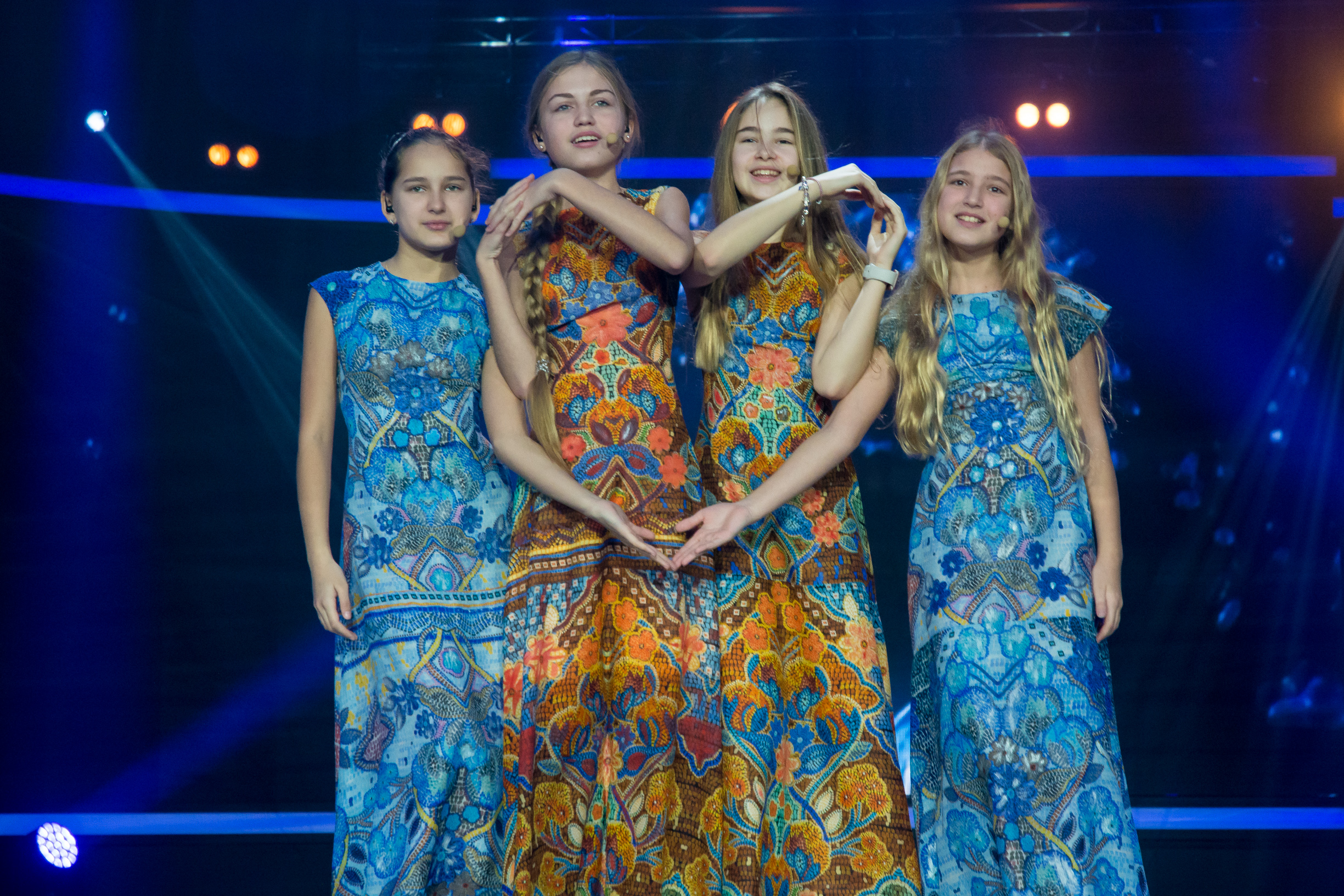
Water of Life Project in Valletta (2016)

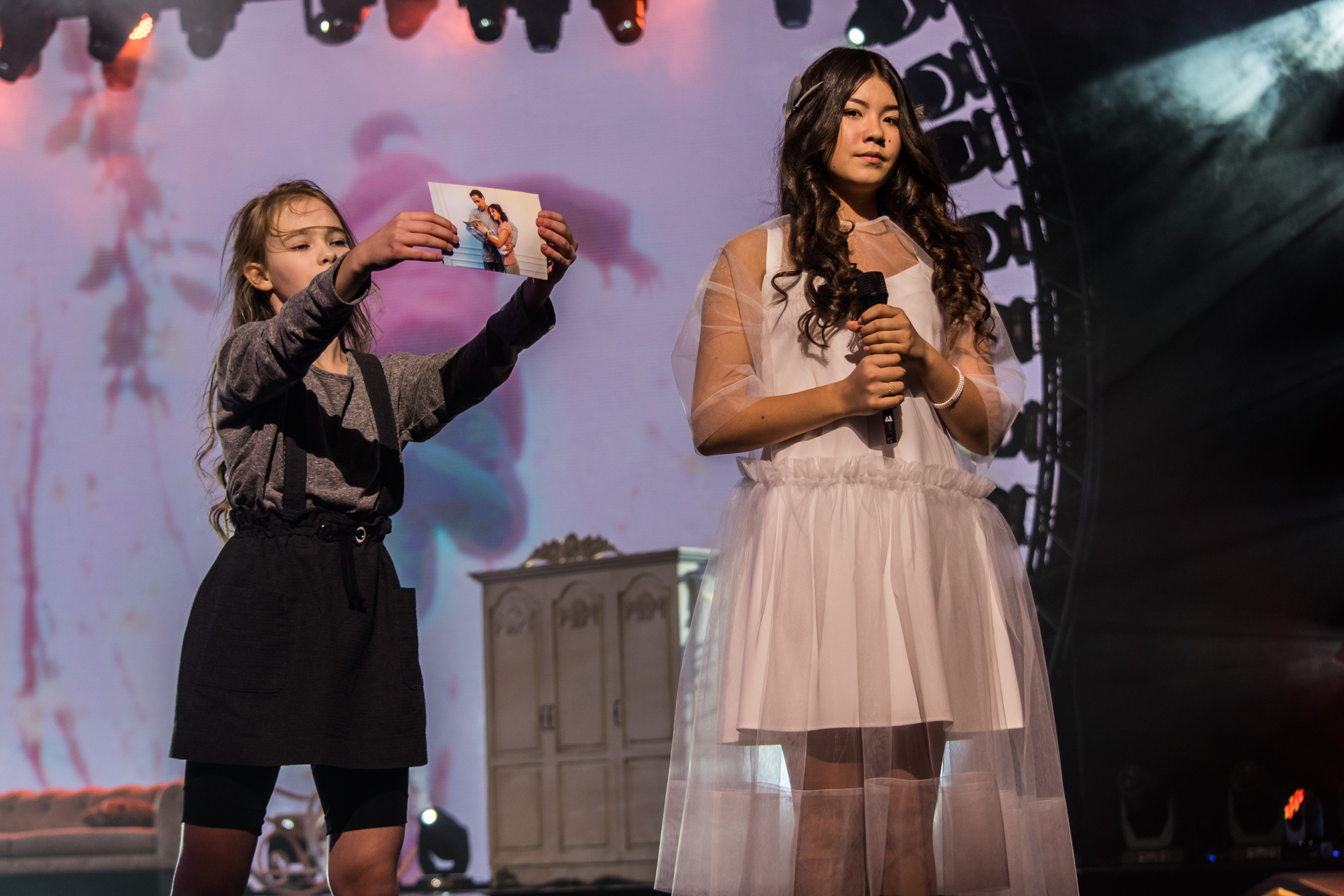
Polina Bogusevich in Tbilisi (2017)

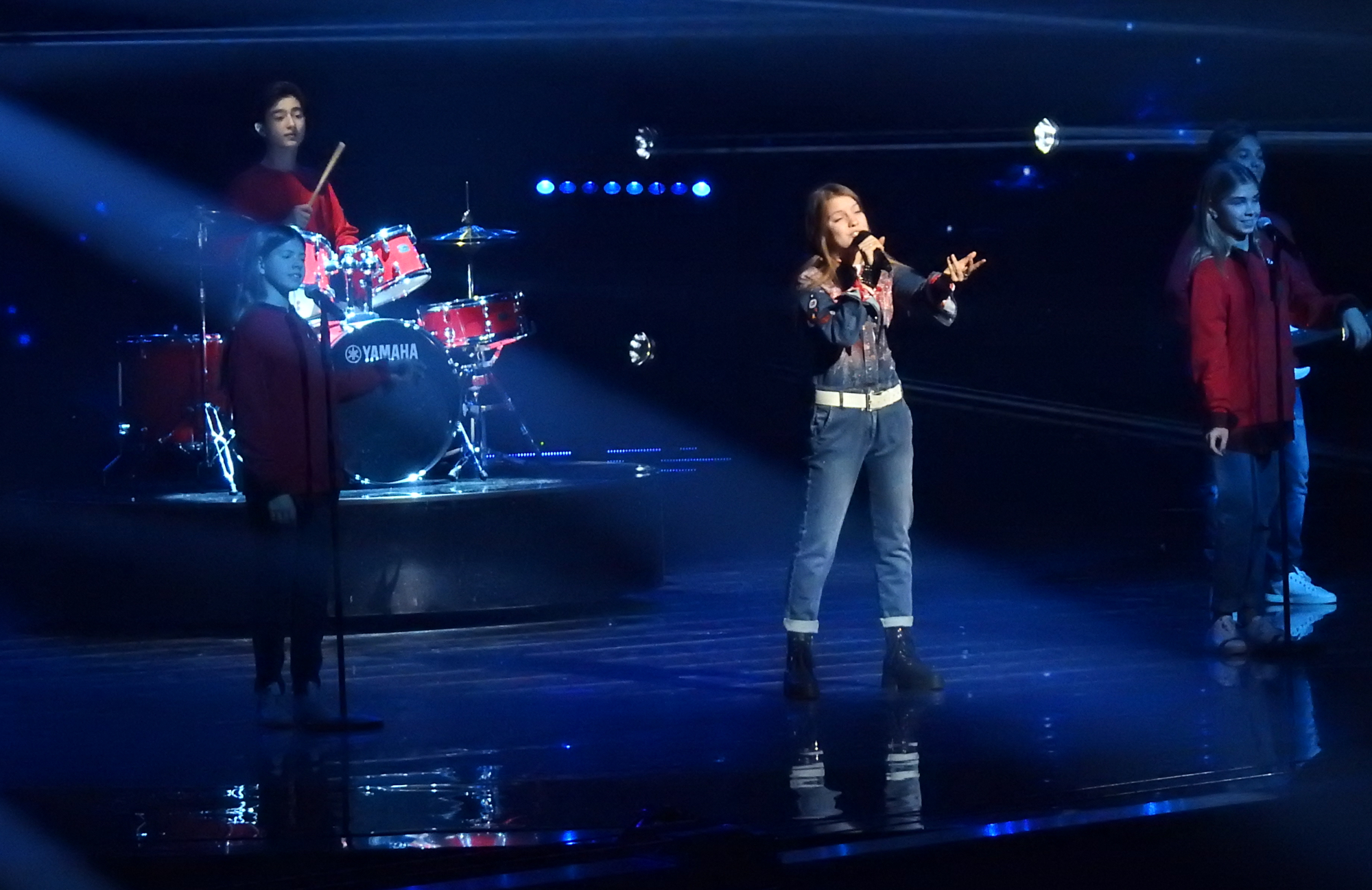
Anna Filipchuk in Minsk (2018)

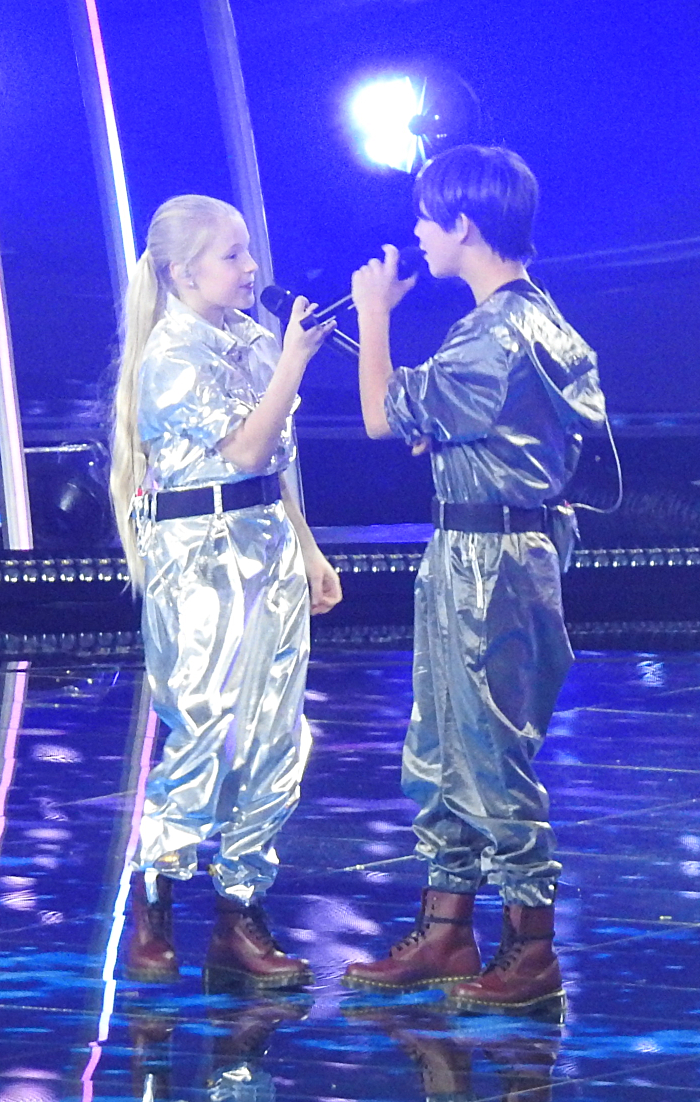
Tatyana Mezhentseva and Denberel Oorzhak in Gliwice (2019)

== Commentators and spokespersons ==
Year(s)	Channel	Commentator(s)	Spokesperson	Ref.
2005	Russia TV	Yuri Nikolaev	Roman Kerimov	
2006	Russia TV	Olga Shelest	Roman Kerimov	
2007	Russia TV	Olga Shelest	Marina Knyazeva	
2008	Russia TV	Olga Shelest	Sarina	
2009	Russia TV	Olga Shelest	Philip Masurov	
2010	Russia-1	Olga Shelest	Philip Masurov	
2011	Russia-1	Olga Shelest	Valentin Sadiki	
2012	Russia-1	Olga Shelest	Valentin Sadiki	
2013	Carousel	Alexander Gurevich	Mariya Bakhireva	
2014	Carousel	Olga Shelest and Alexander Gurevich	Mariya Kareeva	
2015	Carousel	Olga Shelest	Sofia Dolganova	
2016	Carousel	Olga Shelest	Mikhail Smirnov	
2017	Carousel	Lipa Teterich	Tonya Volodina	
2018	Carousel	Anton Zorkin	Dina and Khryusha	
2019	NTV	Vadim Takmenev and Lera Kudryavtseva	Alisa and Khryusha	
2019	Carousel	Anton Zorkin	Alisa and Khryusha	
2020	Carousel	Anton Zorkin and Khryusha	Mikella Abramova and Khryusha	
2021	Carousel	Anton Zorkin and Khryusha	Liza Gureeva	
2022–2026	Suspended from broadcasting		Did not participate	

== See also ==
- Russia in the Eurovision Song Contest – Junior version of the Eurovision Song Contest.
- Russia in the Intervision Song Contest – A competition formerly organized by the International Radio and Television Organisation (OIRT) from 1965 to 1980, and revived in 2025.
- Russia–Ukraine relations in the Eurovision Song Contest – Relations between the two countries in the Junior and Senior Eurovision Song Contests.
