= Junior Eurovision Song Contest 2009 =

International song competition for youth

- For the Joy of People

Date and venue
- Final: 21 November 2009
- Venue: Palace of Sports; Kyiv, Ukraine

Organisation
- Organiser: European Broadcasting Union (EBU)
- Executive supervisor: Svante Stockselius

Production
- Host broadcaster: National Television Company of Ukraine (NTU)
- Director: Sven Stojanovic
- Executive producer: Ruslan Tkachenko
- Presenters: Ani Lorak; Timur Miroshnychenko; Dmytro Borodin (Green Room)

Participants
- Number of entries: 13
- Returning countries: Sweden
- Non-returning countries: Bulgaria; Greece; Lithuania
- Participation map: Competing countries Countries that participated in the past but not in 2009

Vote
- Voting system: Each country awards 1–8, 10, and 12 points to their 10 favourite songs
- Winning song: Netherlands "Click Clack"

The Junior Eurovision Song Contest 2009 was the seventh edition of the Junior Eurovision Song Contest, held on 21 November 2009 at the Palace of Sports in Kyiv, Ukraine, and presented by Ani Lorak and Timur Miroshnychenko. It was organised by the European Broadcasting Union (EBU) and host broadcaster the National Television Company of Ukraine (NTU). Broadcasters from 13 countries participated in the contest.

The winner was the Netherlands with the song "Click Clack" by Ralf Mackenbach. At the age of 14, he was the oldest person to win the Junior Eurovision Song Contest in its seven-year history. He was joined by Italy's Vincenzo Cantiello who won the 2014 contest also at the age of 14. Luara Hayrapetyan achieved another second place for Armenia. Ekaterina Ryabova also took second place for Russia.

Both Prime Minister Yulia Tymoshenko and President of Ukraine Viktor Yushchenko were present during the final; Tymoshenko was also present and gave a speech during the opening ceremony on 16 November 2009.

== Location ==
Locations of the bidding countries. The eliminated countries are marked in red. The considered cities are marked in yellow. The chosen host country is marked in blue.

=== Bidding phase and host selection ===
The European Broadcasting Union (EBU) invited broadcasters to bid for the rights to host the Junior Eurovision Song Contest 2009; three bids were received from Belarus, Serbia, and Ukraine. TV4 of Sweden had originally sent in a bid during summer 2007, but soon withdrew its bid after deciding to completely withdraw from the contest.

On 6 June 2008, after deliberations by the EBU, the National Television Company of Ukraine (NTU) was granted the rights to the 2009 contest and confirmed they would host it in Kyiv. An NTU organiser team headed by then-First Lady of Ukraine Kateryna Yushchenko originally proposed a candidacy set in Camp Artek (located in Gurzuf, Crimea) to the EBU during discussions held in Rotterdam as part of the 2007 contest. However, the bid of Kyiv, with its proposed location being Eurovision Song Contest 2005 venue Palace of Sports, prevailed due to better infrastructure and the experience in past Eurovision events.

On 12 November 2009, Ukrainian Deputy Prime Minister Ivan Vasiunyk declared that the contest would not be postponed; earlier, Party of Regions member of parliament Hanna Herman had called on Prime Minister Yulia Tymoshenko to cancel the song contest because of the 2009 flu pandemic in Ukraine.

== Participants ==
Cover art of the official album

The EBU announced the complete list of participating countries in the 2009 contest on 8 June 2009. 13 countries competed in the contest. Sweden returned after missing the previous year's contest, while Bulgaria, Greece and Lithuania withdrew from the contest.

According to the rules of the contest, participants must sing in one of their national languages, however, they are permitted to have up to 25% of the song in a different language.

Prior to the event, a compilation album featuring all the songs from the 2009 contest, along with karaoke versions, was put together by the European Broadcasting Union and released by Universal Music Group on 21 November 2009.

Participants of the Junior Eurovision Song Contest 2009
Country	Broadcaster	Artist	Song	Language (Note: The rules stated that the participants must sing in one of their national languages, however they were permitted to have up to 25% in a different language, as seen in some entries.)	Songwriter(s)
Armenia	AMPTV	Luara Hayrapetyan	"Barcelona" (Բարսելոնա)	Armenian	Luara Hayrapetyan
Belarus	BTRC	Yury Demidovich	"Volshebnyy krolik" (Волшебный кролик)	Russian	Yury Demidovich
Belgium	VRT	Laura Omloop	"Zo verliefd (Yodelo)"	Dutch	Peter Gillis; Laura Omloop; Alain Vande Putte; Miguel Wiels
Cyprus	CyBC	Rafaella Costa	"Thalassa, helios, aeras, fotia" (Θάλασσα, ήλιος, αέρας, φωτιά)	Greek	Rafaella Costa; Martha Paradisioti
Georgia	GPB	Princesses	"Lurji prinveli" (ლურჯი ფრინველი)	Georgian, English	Elene Makashvili; Liza Kenia; Irina Sanikidze; Zaza Tsurtsumia
Macedonia	MRT	Sara Markoska	"Za ljubovta" (За љубовта)	Macedonian	Sara Markoska
Malta	PBS	Francesca and Mikaela	"Double Trouble"	English	Mikaela Bajada; Francesca Sciberras
Netherlands	AVRO	Ralf Mackenbach	"Click Clack"	Dutch, English	Jan van den Langenberg; Ralf Mackenbach
Romania	TVR	Ioana Anuța	"Ai puterea în mâna ta"	Romanian	Ioana Anuța
Russia	VGTRK	Ekaterina Ryabova	"Malenkiy prints" (Маленький принц)	Russian	Ekaterina Ryabova
Serbia	RTS	Ništa Lično	"Onaj pravi" (Онаj прави)	Serbian	Anica Cvetković; Aleksandar Graić
Sweden	TV4	Mimmi Sandén	"Du"	Swedish	Alexander Kronlund; Ali Payami; Mimmi Sandén
Ukraine	NTU	Andranik Alexanyan	"Try topoli, try surmy" (Три тополі, три сурми)	Ukrainian	Andranik Alexanyan; Anastasiya Kravchenko; Maria Kravchenko; Sophia Zlotnyk

=== Returning artists ===
Even though the rules of Junior Eurovision at the time did not allow participation of returning artists, Macedonia's Sara Markoska was a backing vocalist and dancer for Rosica Kulakova and Dimitar Stojmenovski in 2007, and Sweden's Mimmi Sandén previously provided backing vocals for her sister Molly Sandén in 2006.

== Format ==
=== Concept and logo ===
Logo of the contest titled "Tree of life" is based on the artwork "Sunflower of life" by Maria Primachenko, a well known Ukrainian folk art painter. Creative design of the show was based on the logo of the contest, works and ideas of Primachenko as well as on the concept of the show, titled "For the joy of people".

=== Presenters ===
On 22 October 2009, it was revealed that Ani Lorak, Timur Miroshnychenko and Dmytro Borodin would be hosting the contest, with Borodin serving as the green room host.

== Contest overview ==
The event took place on 21 November 2009 at 21:15 EET (20:15 CET). Thirteen countries participated, with the running order published on 13 October 2009. All the countries competing were eligible to vote with the jury and televote. The Netherlands won with 121 points, with Armenia and Russia, both of whom came second, completing the top three. Cyprus, Macedonia, and Romania occupied the bottom three positions.

The show was opened by the children's ballet A6 and the Jazz-Step Dance Class of Volodymyr Shpudeyko; they were followed by the children's sports dancing ensemble Pulse. The interval acts included young acrobats Karyn Rudnycka and Yuriy Kuzynsky accompanying all participating contestants on stage, whilst Ani Lorak performed her Eurovision 2008 entry "Shady Lady".

R/O	Country	Artist	Song	Points	Place
1	Sweden	Mimmi Sandén	"Du"	68	6
2	Russia	Ekaterina Ryabova	"Malenkiy prints"	116	2
3	Armenia	Luara Hayrapetyan	"Barcelona"	116	2
4	Romania	Ioana Anuța	"Ai puterea în mâna ta"	19	13
5	Serbia	Ništa Lično	"Onaj pravi"	34	10
6	Georgia	Princesses	"Lurji prinveli"	68	6
7	Netherlands	Ralf Mackenbach	"Click Clack"	121	1
8	Cyprus	Rafaella Costa	"Thalassa, helios, aeras, fotia"	32	11
9	Malta	Francesca and Mikaela	"Double Trouble"	55	8
10	Ukraine	Andranik Alexanyan	"Try topoli, try surmy"	89	5
11	Belgium	Laura Omloop	"Zo verliefd (Yodelo)"	113	4
12	Belarus	Yury Demidovich	"Volshebnyy krolik"	48	9
13	Macedonia	Sara Markoska	"Za ljubovta"	31	12

=== Spokespersons ===
1. Sweden – Elise Mattison
2. Russia – Philip Masurov
3. Armenia – Razmik Arghajanyan
4. Romania – Iulia Ciobanu
5. Serbia – Nevena Božović
6. Georgia – Ana Davitaia
7. Netherlands – Marissa
8. Cyprus – Yiorgos Ioannides
9. Malta – Daniel Testa
10. Ukraine – Marietta
11. Belgium – Oliver
12. Belarus – Arina Aleshkevich
13. Macedonia – Jovana Krstevska

== Detailed voting results ==
Each country decided their votes through a 50% jury and 50% televoting system which decided their top ten songs using the points 12, 10, 8, 7, 6, 5, 4, 3, 2, and 1. Since Sweden did not broadcast the show until the morning after, their points were made up solely by their national jury.

Voting results
Voting procedure used: 50% jury and televote 100% jury vote		Total score	Sweden	Russia	Armenia	Romania	Serbia	Georgia	Netherlands	Cyprus	Malta	Ukraine	Belgium	Belarus	Macedonia
Contestants	Sweden	68		4	5	2	5	3	6	2	5	4	7	5	8
Contestants	Russia	116	6		10	8	10	7	7	10	7	12	8	12	7
Contestants	Armenia	116	10	12		6	7	12	10	12	6	10	10	8	1
Contestants	Romania	19	1						1		2				3
Contestants	Serbia	34	2	1	3	3		2		3		3		1	4
Contestants	Georgia	68	3	5	6	7	1		4	7	10	6	5	2	
Contestants	Netherlands	121	12	8	8	12	8	8		8	8	8	12	7	10
Contestants	Cyprus	32	7	3	2	1		1			1		2	3	
Contestants	Malta	55		2	4	4	4	4	8	4		1	6	4	2
Contestants	Ukraine	89	4	7	12	10	2	10	5	5	4		3	10	5
Contestants	Belgium	113	8	10	7	5	12	6	12	6	12	5		6	12
Contestants	Belarus	48		6	1		3	5	3	1		7	4		6
Contestants	Macedonia	31	5				6		2		3	2	1		

=== 12 points ===
Below is a summary of all 12 points received. All countries were given 12 points at the start of voting to ensure that no country finished with nul points.

N.	Contestant	Nation(s) giving 12 points
4	Belgium	Macedonia, Malta, Netherlands, Serbia
3	Armenia	Cyprus, Georgia, Russia
3	Netherlands	Belgium, Romania, Sweden
2	Russia	Belarus, Ukraine
1	Ukraine	Armenia

== Broadcasts ==
A live broadcast of the Junior Eurovision Song Contest was available worldwide via satellite through European streams such as TVRi, RIK Sat, RTS Sat and MKTV Sat. The official Junior Eurovision Song Contest website also provided a live stream without commentary via the peer-to-peer medium Octoshape.

Broadcasters and commentators in participating countries
Country	Broadcaster(s)	Channel(s)	Commentator(s)	Ref.
Armenia	ARMTV	Armenia 1	Gohar Gasparyan	
Belarus	BTRC	Belarus 1	Denis Kurian	
Belgium	VRT	Eén	Kristien Maes and Ben Roelants	
Cyprus	CyBC	RIK 2, RIK Sat	Kyriakos Pastides	
Georgia	GPB	1TV	Sophia Avtunashvili	
Macedonia	MKRTV	MTV 1, MKTV Sat	Dime Dimitrovski	
Malta	PBS	TVM	Valerie Vella	
Netherlands	AVRO	Nederland 3	Sipke Jan Bousema	
Romania	TVR	TVR 1, TVRi	Ioana Isopescu and Alexandru Nagy	
Russia	VGRTK	Russia-1	Olga Shelest	
Serbia	RTS	RTS2, RTS Sat	Duška Vučinić-Lučić	
Sweden	TV4 (aired in a morning day)		Johanna Karlsson	
Ukraine	NTU	Pershyi	Mariya Orlova	

Broadcasters and commentators in non-participating countries
Country	Broadcaster(s)	Channel(s)	Commentator(s)	Ref.
Australia	SBS	SBS One (delayed) (Note: Delayed broadcast on 14 April 2010 at 13:00)	No commentary	
Azerbaijan	Ictimai TV		Unknown	
Bosnia and Herzegovina	BHRT	BHT 1	Dejan Kukrić	

== See also ==
- Eurovision Song Contest 2009
