= My Name is... (TV program) =

- Countries of origin: Belgium; Netherlands
- Original language: Dutch
- No. of seasons: 2
- No. of episodes: 5

Production
- Camera setup: Multi-camera
- Running time: 70 min

Original release
- Network: RTL 4 VTM
- Release: August 28, 2010 – November 17, 2011

My Name is... is a talent show television program founded by the Dutch television host, Albert Verlinde and broadcast by the Belgium and Dutch television channels VTM and RTL 4. The format was also purchased by the German and French television.
