= Luara Hayrapetyan =

Armenian-Russian singer (born 1997)

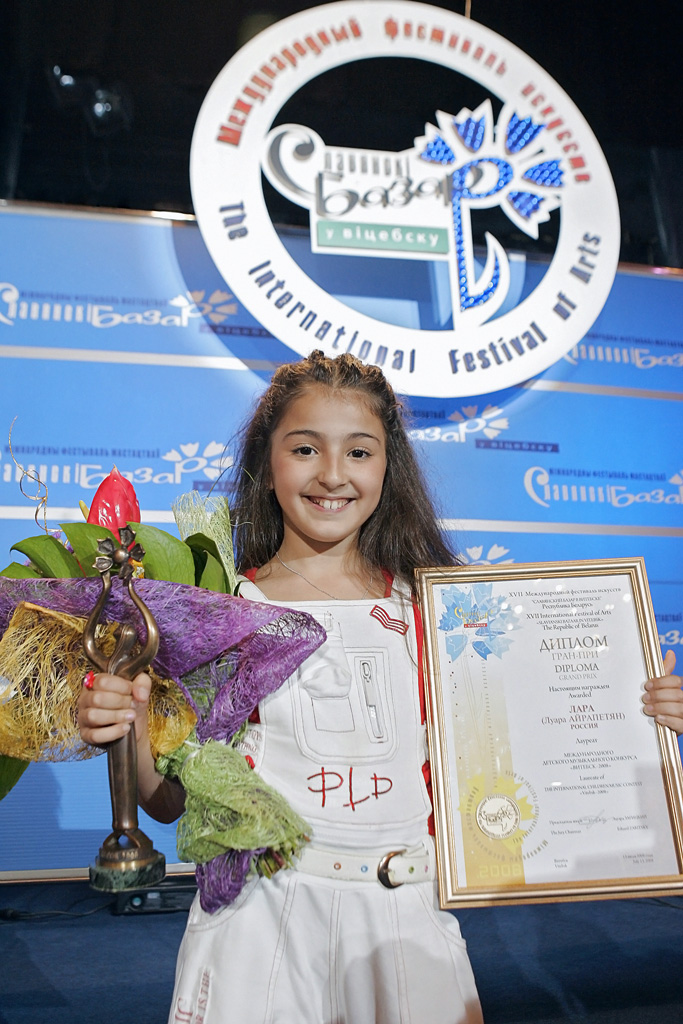
- Russia's Lara, 10, won the Grand Prix and the Lira special prize during the Sixth Children's International Music Contest Vitebsk-2008, part of the Slavyansky Bazar Music festival in Vitebsk

Background information
- Also known as: Lara
- Born: Luara Gurgenovna Hayrapetyan; Լուարա Գուրգենի Հայրապետյան; Луара Гургеновна Айрапетян; 29 September 1997 (age 28); Astrakhan, Russia
- Occupation: Singer
- Years active: 2004–present
- Website: Official Website

Luara Gurgenovna Hayrapetyan (Armenian: Լուարա Գուրգենի Հայրապետյան, Russian: Луара Гургеновна Айрапетян; born 29 September 1997 in Astrakhan, Russia) is an Armenian-Russian singer. She represented Armenia at the Junior Eurovision Song Contest 2009 in Kyiv, Ukraine with her self-composed pop song "Barcelona", finishing in second place.

== Biography ==
Hayrapetyan was born in Astrakhan, Russia. She began singing at the age of four, studying at the children's music studio "Vesnushki" of the Astrakhangasprom Cultural Centre, where she was a leading soloist, as well as attending gymnasium. Hayrapetyan's hobbies included ballroom dancing and vocal classes. Having Armenian citizenship, Hayrapetyan also resided in Kapan, Armenia, where she took further vocal, saxophone and dance classes.

She currently lives in Los Angeles, USA.

== Career ==
The first brush with fame was when Luara entered into the Russian national selection for the Junior Eurovision Song Contest 2006. At just 9, she came 2nd with her song "Krasnaya Shapochka" (Little Red Riding Hood). Hayrapetyan competed at the 2008 Slavianski Bazaar in Vitebsk Children's Contest. Representing Russia under the name "Lara", Hayrapetyan was presented with the Grand Prix Award and "Lira" Diploma.

Hayrapetyan is perhaps best known for her representation of Armenia at the 2009 Junior Eurovision Song Contest held in Kyiv, Ukraine. Hayrapetyan performed the song "Barcelona", tying for second place overall with Russia's Ekaterina Ryabova.

Prior to her qualification for the 2009 Contest, Hayrapetyan competed in National Finals for the Junior Eurovision Song Contest twice. In 2006, at Russia's National Final, Hayrapetyan placed 2nd with her song "Krasnaya Shapochka". In 2008, at Armenia's National Final, she placed 3rd with her song, "Im Ergy".

=== Awards and honours (2004–2010) ===
- 2004 – I Prize Winner of the International Contest "Malen'kie Zvezdochki" (Tuapse, All-Russian Children Center "Orlenok")
- 2005 – I Prize Winner of the International Festival "Childhood Without Borders" (Moscow, Russia)
- 2006 – Qualified for the Russian National Final of Junior Eurovision (2nd place)
- 2007 – Grand Prix Winner of the All-Russian Contest "Volzhskie Sozvezdiya" (Samara, Russia)
  I Prize Winner of the VI All-Russian Contest "Voices of the 21st Century" (Anapa, Russia)
  May 2007 Laureate of "Gasprom" OJSC in "Estrada Vocal" nomination (Kazan, Russia) (Vladimir, Russia)
- 2008 – January 2008 Diploma Winner of VII City Festival of Young Pianists "Music Rainbow"
  Best among pupils of 4th form in knowledge of English
  April 2008 I Prize Winner in "Voices of the 21st Century" interregional final
  Grand Prix Winner of "Slavianski Bazaar in Vitebsk" Junior Edition, winner of the "Lira" Special Prize (Belarus)
  Qualified for Armenian National Final of Junior Eurovision (3rd place)
- 2009 – Qualified for Junior Eurovision Song Contest 2009.
  November 2009 – 2nd place at Junior Eurovision Song Contest 2009 (Kyiv, Ukraine)
  Qualified for the International Final of "New Wave Junior" contest (Moscow, Russia).
- 2009 – Competed at New Wave Junior 2009.

Awards and achievements
Preceded by Monika Manchuarova with "Im Ergi Hnchyune"	Armenia in the Junior Eurovision Song Contest; 2009	Succeeded by Vladimir Arzumanyan with "Mama"
