= Sipke Jan Bousema =

Dutch television presenter

- Born: 15 August 1976 (age 49); Dokkum, Friesland, Netherlands
- Occupations: Television presenter, actor
- Years active: 1999–present

Sipke Jan Bousema (Dokkum, b. 15 August 1976) is a Dutch presenter and actor. Bousema made his television debut in January 1999 at Teleac/NOT as the presenter for Schooltv Weekjournaal.

== Career ==
In the past, he has presented many programmes for AVRO including Museumbende, ZipZoo: coordinate X and ZipZoo: WorldWide. Since 2004 he has been a voice-over on Heartbeat VIPS.

In 2003, Bousema played the role of student Joris van Kampen in De Schippers van de Kameleon. In 2005, he presented the premiere of Kameleon 2 as well as having his own TV drama Sipke Jan and the Mystery of the Magical Ball. The show was a success and in January 2006 it was repeated two times.

Since 2002, Bousema has been an ambassador for Unicef.

Bousema presented the Dutch TV show, Junior Songfestival, to select a contestant for the Junior Eurovision Song Contest 2006 and presented the Junior Eurovision Song Contest 2007 in Rotterdam alongside Kim-Lian van der Meij. Bousema later provided commentary for the 2008 contest in Lemesos, 2009 in Kyiv and the 2010 contest in Minsk.

| Preceded by (Romania) Andreea Marin Bănică and Ioana Ivan | Junior Eurovision Song Contest presenter 2007; With: Kim-Lian van der Meij | Succeeded by (Cyprus) Sophia Paraskeva and Alex Michael |
