= North Macedonia in the Junior Eurovision Song Contest =

- Junior Eurovision Song Contest
- Participating broadcaster: Macedonian Radio Television (MRT)

Participation summary
- Appearances: 21
- First appearance: 2003
- Highest placement: 5th: 2007, 2008
- Participation history: 2003; 2004; 2005; 2006; 2007; 2008; 2009; 2010; 2011; 2012; 2013; 2014; 2015; 2016; 2017; 2018; 2019; 2020; 2021; 2022; 2023; 2024; 2025; 2026
- For the most recent participation see North Macedonia in the Junior Eurovision Song Contest 2026

North Macedonia, presented as F.Y.R. Macedonia until 2019, has been represented at the Junior Eurovision Song Contest 21 times since its debut in the inaugural 2003 contest. The Macedonian participating broadcaster in the contest is Macedonian Radio Television (MRT). It has participated in every contest with the exceptions of 2012, 2014, and 2020 contests.

North Macedonia holds the record for having competed in the most editions of the contest without ever winning. The country's best result is a fifth-place finish, which they achieved in 2007 and 2008.

== History ==
Macedonian Radio Television (MRT) debuted in the inaugural 2003 contest with the song "Ti ne me poznavaš" performed by Marija and Viktorija. The song placed 12th in a field of 16 countries.

Its best performance at the contest has been 5th place, achieved twice to date – in 2007 when North Macedonia was represented by the song "Ding Ding Dong" performed by Rosica Kulakova and Dimitar Stojmenovski, and in 2008 with "Prati mi SMS" performed by Bobi Andonov.

MRT did not participate in 2012 due to issues with the voting process in the contest and the lack of budget available for participation. However, North Macedonia returned to the contest in 2013, held in Kyiv, Ukraine. North Macedonia did not return to the contest in 2014, but returned again in 2015. MRT did not participate in the 2020 contest due to the COVID-19 pandemic, but returned to the 2021 contest in France.

For the 2022 contest, an audition round was held on 23 June 2022 at the MRT Studios in Skopje. The selection criteria were vocal, artistic and scenic quality. On 29 June 2022, it was revealed that Lara Trpčeska and Irina Dazidovska had been selected as Macedonian entrants by the committee. Although originally not part of the act, Jovan Jakimovski was later added after Lara and Irina were selected, and on 2 November it was revealed Lara feat. Jovan and Irina will represent the country with the song "Životot e pred mene", written by Lara Trpčeska, Simon Trpčeski, Jovan Jakimovski and Darko Dimitrov. The song premiered on 3 November 2022 during the MRT programme Dnevnik 2.

For the 2023 contest, an audition round was held on 11 May 2023 at the MRT Studios in Skopje, and on 16 May 2023, it was revealed that 12 year-old Tamara Grujeska had been selected as Macedonian entrant by the committee. Her entry, "Kaži mi, kaži mi koj", was released on 16 October 2023.

The country again planned to take part in 2025. Nela Mančeska was selected as the nation's entrant on 13 June 2025, following an audition that was held on 27 May 2025. On 4 November it was revealed that Mančeska's song would be "Miracle" written by Lazar Cvetkoski and Magdalena Cvetkovska; it was released on 7 November 2025. At the contest, North Macedonia placed seventh out of eighteen entries with 141 points. This marked the country's highest placing since 2019 and its second highest point tally in history.

== Participation overview ==
Table key
◁	Last place
†	Upcoming event

Year	Artist	Song	Language	Place	Points
2003	Marija and Viktorija	"Ti ne me poznavaš" (Ти не ме познаваш)	Macedonian	12	19
2004	Martina Siljanovska	"Zabava" (Забава)	Macedonian	7	64
2005	Denis Dimoski	"Rodendeski baknež" (Родендески бакнеж)	Macedonian	8	68
2006	Zana Aliu	"Vljubena" (Вљубена)	Macedonian	15 ◁	14
2007	Rosica Kulakova and Dimitar Stojmenovski	"Ding ding dong" (Динг динг донг)	Macedonian	5	111
2008	Bobi Andonov	"Prati mi SMS" (Прати ми СМС)	Macedonian	5	93
2009	Sara Markoska	"Za ljubovta" (За љубовта)	Macedonian	12	31
2010	Anja Veterova	"Eooo, Eooo"	Macedonian	12	38
2011	Dorijan Dlaka	"Žimi ovoj frak" (Жими овој фрак)	Macedonian	12	31
2013	Barbara Popović	"Ohrid i muzika" (Охрид и музика)	Macedonian	12 ◁	19
2015	Ivana Petkovska and Magdalena Aleksovska	"Pletenka – Braid of Love" (Плетенка)	Macedonian	17 ◁	26
2016	Martija Stanojković	"Love Will Lead Our Way (Ljubovta ne vodi)" (Љубовта не води)	Macedonian, English	12	41
2017	Mina Blažev	"Dancing Through Life"	Macedonian, English	12	69
2018	Marija Spasovska	"Doma" (Дома)	Macedonian	12	99
2019	Mila Moskov	"Fire"	Macedonian, English	6	150
2021	Dajte Muzika	"Green Forces"	Macedonian, English	9	114
2022	Lara feat. Jovan and Irina	"Životot e pred mene" (Животот е пред мене)	Macedonian, English	14	54
2023	Tamara Grujeska	"Kaži mi, kaži mi koj" (Кажи ми, кажи ми кој)	Macedonian, English	12	76
2024	Ana and Aleksej	"Marathon"	Macedonian, English	16	54
2025	Nela Mančeska	"Miracle"	Macedonian, English	7	141
2026	Ana Stojanoska	"Idnata jas" (Идната јас)	Macedonian	16 ◁	57
2027	Confirmed intention to participate †				

== Commentators and spokespersons ==
Year	Commentator	Spokesperson	Ref.
2003	Milanka Rašik	Geel Ke	
2004	Milanka Rašik	Filip	
2005	Milanka Rašik	Vase Dokovski	
2006	Milanka Rašik	Denis Dimoski	
2007	Milanka Rašik	Mila Zafirović	
2008	Ivona Bogoevska	Marija Zafirovska	
2009	Dime Dimitrovski	Jovana Krstevska	
2010	Toni Drenkovski and Monika Todorovska	Sara Markoska	
2011	Elizabeta Cebova	Anja Veterova	
2012	No broadcast	Did not participate	
2013	Tina Tautovic and Spasija Veljanoska	Sofija Spasenoska	
2014	No broadcast	Did not participate	
2015	Tina Tautovic and Spasija Veljanoska	Aleksandrija Čaliovski	
2016	Eli Tanaskovska	Antonija Dimitrijevska	
2017	Eli Tanaskovska	Kjara Blažev	
2018	Eli Tanaskovska	Arina Pehtereva	
2019	Eli Tanaskovska	Magdalena	
2020	Eli Tanaskovska	Did not participate	
2021	Eli Tanaskovska	Fendi	
2022	Eli Tanaskovska	Mariam Mamadashvili	
2023	Eli Tanaskovska	Sofya Lyubinskaya	
2024	Eli Tanaskovska	Aleksandra Mitevska	
2025	Jana Burčeska	Darija Maksimova	
2026	Zorica Nikolovska and Vane Markoski	Nela Mančeska	

== See also ==
- North Macedonia in the Eurovision Song Contest
