= Romania in the Junior Eurovision Song Contest =

- Junior Eurovision Song Contest
- Participating broadcaster: Televiziunea Română (TVR)

Participation summary
- Appearances: 7
- First appearance: 2003
- Last appearance: 2009
- Highest placement: 4th: 2004
- Host: 2006
- Participation history: 2003; 2004; 2005; 2006; 2007; 2008; 2009; 2010 – 2025
- For the most recent participation see Romania in the Junior Eurovision Song Contest 2009

Romania has been represented at the Junior Eurovision Song Contest since the first contest in 2003 until 2009. The Romanian participating broadcaster in the contest is Televiziunea Română (TVR). Its best result came in its second participation, when "Îți mulțumesc" by Noni Răzvan Ene came fourth at the Junior Eurovision Song Contest 2004. TVR hosted the 2006 Contest, where it was held at Sala Polivalentă in Bucharest on 2 December 2006. In 2010, TVR withdrew from the Junior Eurovision Song Contest.

== Participation overview ==
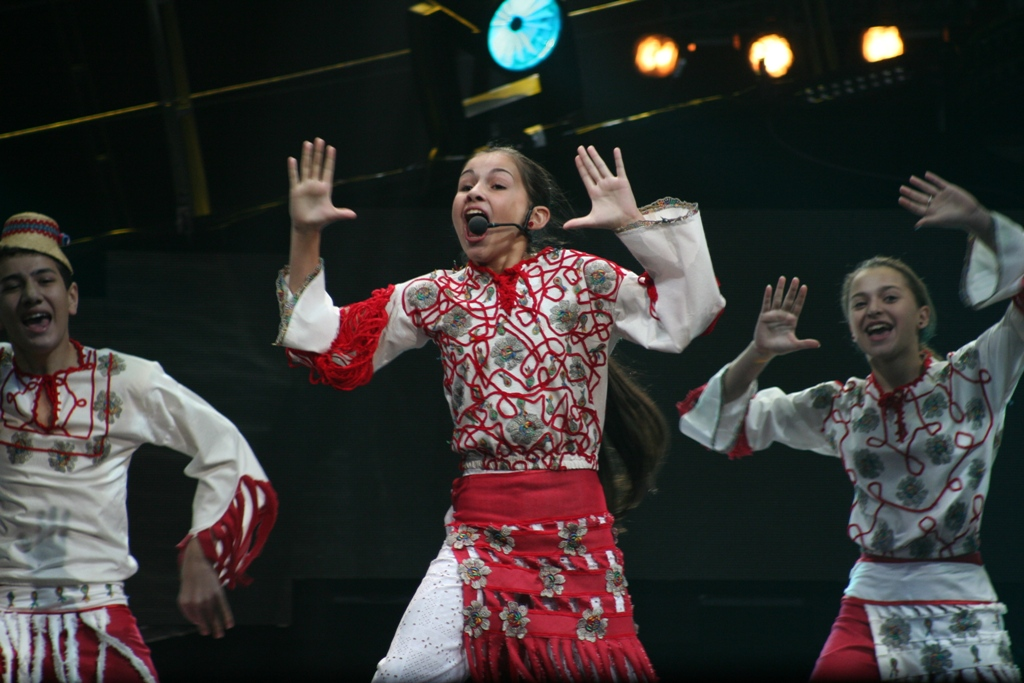
Alina Eremia in Hasselt (2005)

Table key
| ◁ | Last place |

| Year | Artist | Song | Language | Place | Points |
|---|---|---|---|---|---|
| 2003 | Bubu | "Tobele sunt viața mea" | Romanian | 10 | 35 |
| 2004 | Noni Răzvan Ene | "Îți mulțumesc" | Romanian | 4 | 123 |
| 2005 | Alina Eremia | "Țurai!" | Romanian | 5 | 89 |
| 2006 | New Star Music | "Povestea mea" | Romanian | 6 | 80 |
| 2007 | 4Kids | "Sha-la-la" | Romanian | 10 | 54 |
| 2008 | Mădălina and Andrada | "Salvați planeta" | Romanian | 9 | 58 |
| 2009 | Ioana Anuța | "Ai puterea în mâna ta" | Romanian | 13 ◁ | 19 |

== Commentators and spokespersons ==
| Year(s) | Commentator | Spokesperson |
|---|---|---|
| 2003 | Ioana Isopecu and Alexandru Nagy | Liana Ursu |
| 2004 | Ioana Isopecu and Alexandru Nagy | Emy |
| 2005 | Ioana Isopecu and Alexandru Nagy | Beatrice Soare |
| 2006 | Ioana Isopecu and Alexandru Nagy | Andrea Nastase |
| 2007 | Ioana Isopecu and Alexandru Nagy | Iulia Ciobanu |
| 2008 | Ioana Isopecu and Alexandru Nagy | Iulia Ciobanu |
| 2009 | Ioana Isopecu and Alexandru Nagy | Iulia Ciobanu |
| 2010–2026 | No broadcast | Did not participate |

== Hostings ==
| Year | Location | Venue | Presenters |
|---|---|---|---|
| 2006 | Bucharest | Sala Polivalentă | Andreea Marin Bănică and Ioana Ivan |

== See also ==
- Romania in the Eurovision Song Contest
