= Lithuania in the Junior Eurovision Song Contest 2008 =

- Junior Eurovision Song Contest 2008
- Country: Lithuania
- Selection process: Mažųjų žvaigždžių ringas
- Selection date: Semi-finals: 6 September 2008; 13 September 2008; 20 September 2008; 27 September 2008; Final: 5 October 2008

Competing entry
- Song: "Laiminga diena"
- Artist: Eglė Jurgaitytė

Placement
- Final result: 3rd, 103 points

Participation chronology

Lithuanian broadcaster LRT announced their participation for Junior Eurovision Song Contest 2008. The National Final, "Mažųjų žvaigždžių ringas" chose Eglė Jurgaitytė to represent Lithuania in the Junior Eurovision Song Contest 2008.

== Before Junior Eurovision ==
=== Mažųjų žvaigždžių ringas ===
The national selection show Mažųjų žvaigždžių ringas consisted of four semi-finals held between 6 and 27 September 2008 and a final held on 5 October 2008.

In the semi-finals, the songs first faced a public televote where the winner qualified. A three-member jury panel then selected an additional two qualifiers from the remaining entries to proceed to the final. Four wildcard finalists were also selected from each semi-final out of the remaining non-qualifying acts. In the final, the winner was determined by a 50/50 combination of votes from a five-member jury panel and public televoting.

==== Semi-final 1 ====
The first semi-final was held on 6 September 2008. Three entries qualified to the final. The six competing entries first faced a public televote where the winning song advanced. An additional qualifier was selected from the remaining five entries by the jury. A wildcard act was also selected from the remaining non-qualifying acts to proceed to the final. The members of the jury consisted of Aistė Pilvelytė, Vytautas Miškinis and Ara Veberis.

Public vote qualifier

Jury qualifier

Draw	Artist	Song	Jury		Public		Result
Draw	Artist	Song	Votes	Place	Televote	Place	Result
1	Saulės vaikai	"Šoksim visą dieną"	34	1	276	2	Advanced
2	Kvinta	"Muzikos virusas"	30	2	140	4	Wildcard
3	Gintarė Korsakaitė	"Su saule išėjai"	26	3	160	3	Eliminated
4	Rūta Jonaitytė & Studio "E-VITA"	"Ritmas"	21	4	133	6	Eliminated
5	Greta Jurevičiūtė	"Jūros smuikai"	18	5	139	5	Eliminated
6	PYPLĖS & D.	"Pyplės"	15	6	564	1	Advanced

==== Semi-final 2 ====
The second semi-final was held on 13 September 2008. Three entries qualified to the final. The six competing entries first faced a public televote where the winning song advanced. An additional qualifier was selected from the remaining five entries by the jury. A wildcard act was also selected from the remaining non-qualifying acts to proceed to the final. The members of the jury consisted of Andrius Borisevičius, Julija Ritčik and Vaidas Baumila.

Public vote qualifier

Jury qualifier

Draw	Artist	Song	Jury		Public		Result
Draw	Artist	Song	Votes	Place	Televote	Place	Result
1	Karolina Žibkutė	"Vaka biedas"	26	3	102	6	Eliminated
2	Sigita Padvariškytė	"Kas ji?"	34	1	229	2	Advanced
3	Karolis Didžiokas	"Agento 008 sapnas"	15	6	141	5	Wildcard
4	Justina Barbarovičiūtė	"Sapnai"	30	2	363	1	Advanced
5	Miglė Raginytė	"Man taip įdomiau"	19	5	274	3	Eliminated
6	Deimantė Meilutė	"Išskleisk sparnus"	20	4	181	4	Eliminated

==== Semi-final 3 ====
The third semi-final was held on 20 September 2008. Three entries qualified to the final. The six competing entries first faced a public televote where the winning song advanced. An additional qualifier was selected from the remaining five entries by the jury. A wildcard act was also selected from the remaining non-qualifying acts to proceed to the final. The members of the jury consisted of Augustė, Laurynas Šarkinas and Steponas Januška.

Public vote qualifier

Jury qualifier

Draw	Artist	Song	Jury		Public		Result
Draw	Artist	Song	Votes	Place	Televote	Place	Result
1	Girls LT	"Lie-tu-va"	24	3	513	1	Advanced
2	Dominykas Kovaliovas	"Svajonė"	20	4	79	6	Eliminated
3	Raminta Mačytė	"Kompiuteriniai vaikai"	16	6	117	5	Eliminated
4	Mums gerai	"Draugės amžina"	34	1	131	4	Advanced
5	Boys LT	"Kenkėjas – kompiuteris"	18	5	279	3	Eliminated
6	Monika Valiuškytė	"Muzika – Deivė"	32	2	282	2	Wildcard

==== Semi-final 4 ====
The fourth semi-final was held on 27 September 2008. Three entries qualified to the final. The seven competing entries first faced a public televote where the winning song advanced. An additional qualifier was selected from the remaining six entries by the jury. A wildcard act was also selected from the remaining non-qualifying acts to proceed to the final. The members of the jury consisted of Artūras Novikas, Andrius Glušakovas and Marius Matulevičius.

Public vote qualifier

Jury qualifier

Draw	Artist	Song	Jury		Public		Result
Draw	Artist	Song	Votes	Place	Televote	Place	Result
1	Eglė Jurgaitytė	"Laiminga diena"	36	1	1233	1	Advanced
2	Evelina Vaitkutė	"Vaivorykštės tiltai"	26	2	183	6	Advanced
3	Guoda Petrauskaitė	"Mano CV"	25	3	324	4	Wildcard
4	Ringailė Difartaitė	"Kartais norisi kažko"	22	4	195	5	Eliminated
5	Elvina Milkauskaitė	"Mano žodžiai"	19	5	496	3	Eliminated
6	Dorotėja Kravčenkaitė	"Mergaitė paprasta"	15	6	119	7	Eliminated
7	Just LT	"Žinau"	13	7	812	2	Eliminated

==== Final ====
The final was held on 5 October 2008 at the LRT TV Studios in Vilnius, where 12 participants competed. The winner was chosen by televoting (50%) and a five-member "expert" jury (50%). The members of the jury consisted of Rosita Čivilytė, Eva, Tomas Sinickis, Saulius Urbonavičius and Darius Užkuraitis.

Draw	Artist	Song	Jury		Public		Total	Place
Draw	Artist	Song	Votes	Points	Televote	Points	Total	Place
1	Justina Barbarovičiūtė	"Sapnai"	16	2	429	2	4	10
2	Karolis Didžiokas	"Agento 008 sapnas"	8	0	205	0	0	12
3	Girls LT	"Lie-tu-va"	7	0	678	5	5	7
4	Eglė Jurgaitytė	"Laiminga diena"	48	10	3316	12	22	1
5	Kvinta	"Muzikos virusas"	60	12	1342	8	20	2
6	Mums gerai	"Draugės amžina"	19	5	217	0	5	7
7	Sigita Padvariškytė	"Kas ji?"	17	3	313	1	4	10
8	Guoda Petrauskaitė	"Mano CV"	26	6	486	3	9	6
9	PYPLĖS & D.	"Pyplės"	9	1	509	4	5	7
10	Saulės vaikai	"Šoksim visą dieną"	18	4	2160	10	14	4
11	Evelina Vaitkutė	"Vaivorykštės tiltai"	42	8	1101	7	15	3
12	Monika Valiuškytė	"Muzika – Deivė"	30	7	841	6	13	5

== At Junior Eurovision ==
=== Voting ===
Points awarded to Lithuania
Score	Country
12 points (Note: All countries received one set of 12 points to ensure no country finished with nul points.)	Serbia
10 points	Georgia; Macedonia; Malta
8 points	Belgium; Netherlands; Romania
7 points	Russia
6 points	Belarus; Ukraine
5 points	
4 points	
3 points	Bulgaria
2 points	Cyprus
1 point	Greece

Points awarded by Lithuania
Score	Country
12 points	Georgia
10 points	Ukraine
8 points	Russia
7 points	Malta
6 points	Macedonia
5 points	Netherlands
4 points	Belgium
3 points	Belarus
2 points	Cyprus
1 point	Romania
