= Serbia in the Junior Eurovision Song Contest 2008 =

- Junior Eurovision Song Contest 2008
- Country: Serbia
- Selection process: National Final; 50% Televoting; 50% Jury
- Selection date: 21 September 2008

Competing entry
- Song: "Uvek kad u nebo pogledam"
- Artist: Maja Mazić

Placement
- Final result: 12th, 37 points

Participation chronology

Serbia selected their Junior Eurovision entry for 2008 through a national final consisting of 12 songs. The winning song was selected by televoting and jury voting, which was Maja Mazić with "Uvek kad u nebo pogledam". (English: "When I Look to the Sky").

== National final ==
The Serbian national final was held on 21 September, featuring 12 songs. The winning song was selected by televoting and jury voting. Neustrašivi učitelji stranih jezika and Nevena Božović, the Serbian JESC participants from 2006 and 2007, performed during the voting interval. Božović also performed a duet of "Oro" with Jelena Tomašević, the Serbian participant at the Eurovision Song Contest 2008.

Final - 21 September 2008
Draw	Artist	Song	Points	Place
1	Miona Ilić	"Haker moga srca" (Хакер мога срца)	10	6
2	Emilia Dželatović	"Popravni iz ljubavi" (Поправни из љубави)	6	8
3	Luna Park	"Kad maštam lepši mi je dan" (Кад маштам лепши ми је дан)	5	9
4	Marija Đekić	"Noć što bila je sve" (Ноћ што била је све)	3	11
5	Sonja Škorić	"Odgovor" (Одговор)	10	6
6	Katarina Bojović	"Ja sam se zaljubila" (Ја сам се заљубила)	0	12
7	Iva Blažić	"Zvezda sjaj" (Звезда сјај)	4	9
8	PFP	"Volim te" (Волим те)	4	9
9	Emilija Marković	"Ljubav" (Љубав)	12	4
10	Maja Mazić	"Uvek kad u nebo pogledam" (Увек кад у небо погледам)	20	1
11	Miss 3	"Muzika ispunjava svet" (Музика испуњава свет)	17	2
12	Marija Ugrica and Mateja Mihailović	"Istina je" (Истина је)	17	2

== At Junior Eurovision ==
During the allocation draw on 14 October 2008, Serbia was drawn to perform 9th, following Bulgaria and preceding Malta. Serbia placed 12th, scoring 35 points.

=== Voting ===
Points awarded to Serbia
Score	Country
12 points (Note: All countries received one set of 12 points to ensure no country finished with nul points.)	Macedonia
10 points	
8 points	
7 points	
6 points	Georgia
5 points	
4 points	
3 points	Russia
2 points	
1 point	Armenia; Belgium; Romania; Ukraine

Points awarded by Serbia
Score	Country
12 points	Lithuania
10 points	Georgia
8 points	Macedonia
7 points	Belarus
6 points	Ukraine
5 points	Romania
4 points	Cyprus
3 points	Belgium
2 points	Russia
1 point	Malta
