= Marija Ugrica =

Marija Ugrica Марија Угрица
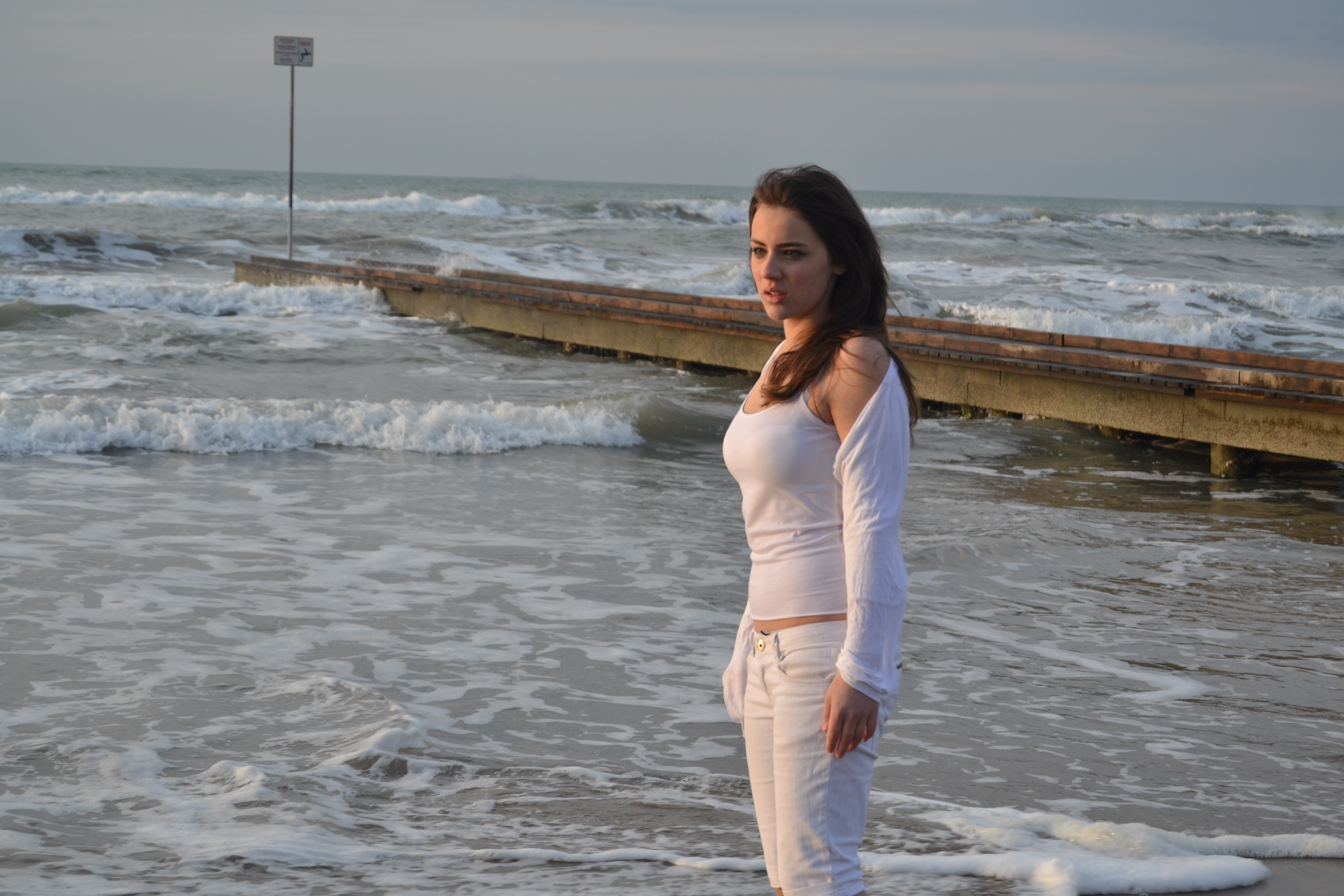
- Marija Ugrica in Lido di Jesolo, Italy at Bez tvog osmeha music video shooting

Background information
- Born: July 27, 1995 (age 31); Belgrade
- Origin: Belgrade, Serbia
- Genres: Pop, R'n'B, Kids
- Occupations: Singer, actress
- Years active: 2005–present

Marija Ugrica (Serbian Cyrillic: Марија Угрица) (born July 27, 1995 in Belgrade, Serbia) is a pop singer well known by her strong live performances and YouTube music covers. She has won numerous awards for her songs and performances in the country and abroad.

== Personal life ==
Marija was born in Belgrade, Serbia. She lives with her parents and her older brother in Belgrade. She graduated from music school Josip Slavenski and elementary school Vladislav Ribnikar in 2010. At both schools, she was an excellent student. At the moment, she goes to Josip Slavenski music high school and The Third Belgrade High School (Serbian Cyrillic: Трећа београдска гимназија)

== Music career ==
=== Junior Eurovision and FeDemus ===
Marija started her professional career in 2005, when she participated in the Serbian National Final for Junior Eurovision Song Contest 2005 with the song Geografija. That was the first Serbian National Final for Junior Eurovision, and it was organised by Decji Kulturni Centar Beograd, like FeDemus is now, so Marija was given the song to sing it at competition. She didn't win, but the public remembered her voice and appearance. After that, she started to participate in many other festivals and competitions. Marija became a member of the RTS children choir.

She participated at FeDemus, a competition for kids and their own songs in 2007, when she sang Zvezdana noć (a song by Filip Trajanovski), and in the next year, 2008, she won that contest as a solo participant with the beautiful ballad Noć puna zvezda. In the same year, she entered many other festivals. One of them was again the Serbian national final for Junior Eurovision Song Contest 2008. She participated with Mateja Mihailović, also a member of the choir, with the song Istina je. They finished in 2nd place.

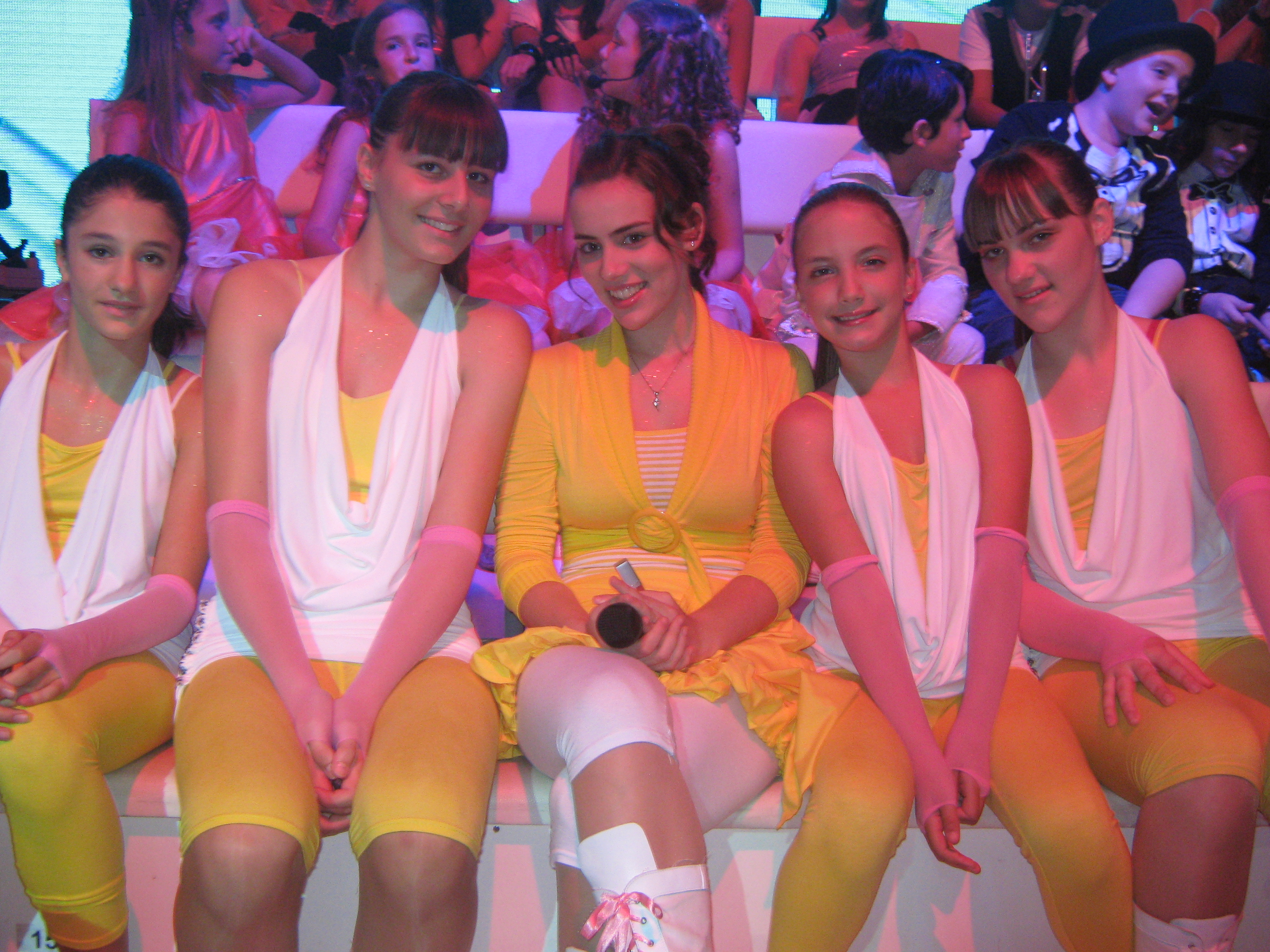
Marija Ugrica at Serbian National Final, Junior Eurovision 2009.

From 2005 to 2009, she won many awards as a singer and pianist. Some of them are Zlatna sirena 2005–2009, Talenti Vračara 2006–2008, and many others. Marija decided to participate in the National Final for Junior Eurovision again, so she sent in the song Hajde da sanjamo, and she was selected along with nine other competitors by the music committee of RTS. Unfortunately, she got sick two days before the contest. She could not even talk or sing, but she decided to participate anyway. Marija finished in 8th place.

Marija sent one of the songs she made for National final 2009 to FeDemus 2009. The song is called Ljubav opet dobija and it is a R'n'B ballad. The organisers gave Marija a duet partner, 17 years old Filip Trajanovski, participant of Serbian national finals and FeDemus, and Serbian teen rap musician, also known as Phil:T. The contest was held in October 2009. Marija and Filip, who got sick on the day of contest and was not present on the stage, won that contest sharing the first place with another girl.

The next year, 2010, Marija decided not to participate at National Final for Junior Eurovision, but anyway she did perform on that stage again, as a part of a children's choir who sang the backing vocals for the group Ništa Lično (Serbian representatives at Junior Eurovision 2009, performing their song Onaj Pravi.

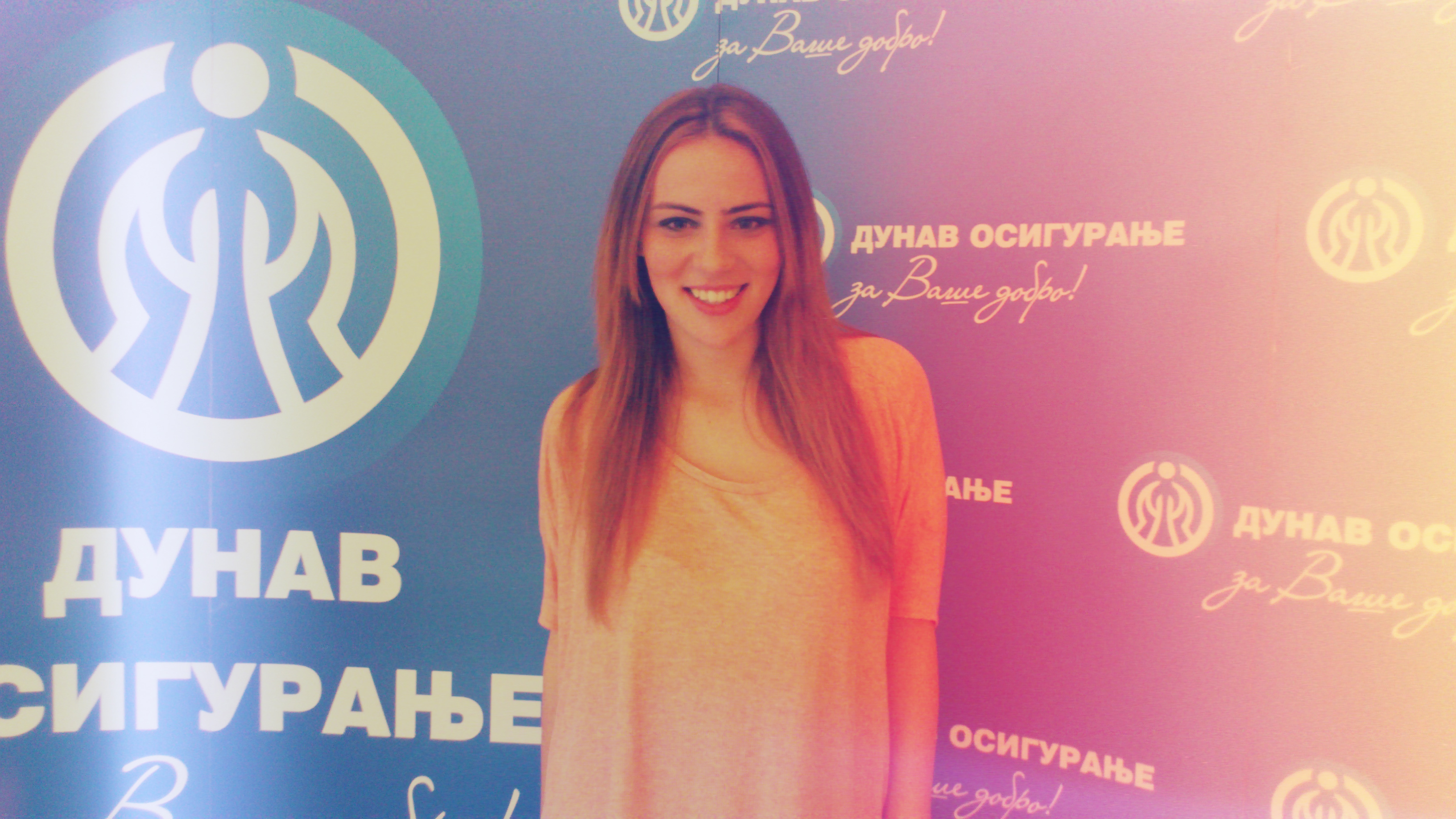
Marija at FeDemus 2012 blue carpet

The fourth year in a row, Marija sent one of her songs to FeDemus. As she was then 15 going on 16, she participated as the interval act. Her song, Sve pesme poklanjam tebi, was originally composed as a strong pop ballad, but later on it was converted to strong pop/rock ballad with some computer instruments in its instrumental. The song was awarded for the best music and lyrics.

In 2011, Marija performed Neću da stanem at FeDemus in a duet. She stated that her final appearance at that music festival would be in its 2012 edition.

Marija submitted two of her songs to FeDemus 2012 concourse, one as a singer-songwriter, and the other one as complete author. She performed Novi dan in interval act of festival and was playing piano during Lazar Vujanić's performance of her song Pored tebe. The song Novi dan was meant to be a turning point in her music career, as she had stated that it would be her last song at FeDemus and that after its 2012 edition she would devote herself to making music for teen and adult audience. In the lyrics, Marija says goodbye to kids' music and shares wonderful memories about her childhood and music.

=== Official singles and music videos ===
In November 2011, she re-recorded her 2007 single Zvezdana noć and did a music video for it. The editing was finished in December, when she launched the music video as her Christmas promotional. The music video was uploaded on YouTube and it has been broadcast during the holidays on Serbian music television stations.

Marija's single Bez tvog osmeha, which was dedicated to her friend who died in 2010, remained unpublished in 2012. In April 2012, on her official Twitter page, she wrote that the song would be available online in July alongside a music video. The promotional material, including the album cover and on-set pictures (from the shooting in Italy) could be seen on her Twitter and Facebook profiles. On June 28, official music video was released under the slogan Every goodbye makes the next hello closer and the song became available online. It hit Serbian music charts at the beginning of July.

=== Singles ===
Year	Single	Composer(s)	Notes
2005	Geografija	Dečji kulturni centar Beograd (DKCB) – Children's Cultural Center Belgrade	Entry in Serbian-Montenegrin National final for Junior Eurovision Song Contest 2005
2007	Zvezdana noć	Filip Trajanovski	FeDemus 2007
2008	Noebo puno zvezda	Marija Ugrica	Entry and winner of FeDemus 2008
2008	Istina je	Marija Ugrica, Mateja Mihajlović	Duet with Mateja Mihailovic, entry in Serbian National final for Junior Eurovision Song Contest 2008
2008	Najlepša stvar	Marija Ugrica, Lazar Vujanić, Dušica Erić	The first version of FeDemus 2009. song
2009	Hajde da sanjamo	Marija Ugrica	Entry in Serbian National final for Junior Eurovision Song Contest 2009
2009	Ljubav opet dobija	Marija Ugrica	Final version and entry for FeDemus 2009.
2010	Sve pesme poklanjam tebi	Marija Ugrica, Lazar Vujanić	Entry in FeDemus 2010.
2011	Bez tvog osmeha	Marija Ugrica, Lazar Vujanić	Unpublished
2011	Neću da stanem	Marija Ugrica	Duet; Interval act of FeDemus 2011.
2012	Bez tvog osmeha	Marija Ugrica, Lazar Vujanić	Official Single
2012	Novi dan	Marija Ugrica	Interval act of FeDemus 2012.
2013	Ostani	Marija Ugrica, Lazar Vujanić	Official Single, potential contestant of Beosong 2013 (Serbian National final for Eurovision Song Contest 2013)
2014	Zauvek bi trajalo	Lazar Vujanić	Official Single
2016	Slavuj	Marija Ugrica, Lazar Vujanić	Official Single, coming soon
