= Netherlands in the Junior Eurovision Song Contest 2008 =

2008 Junior Eurovision participation

- Junior Eurovision Song Contest 2008
- Country: Netherlands
- Selection process: Junior Songfestival 2008 ⅓ Kids' Jury ⅓ Jury ⅓ Televoting
- Selection date: Semi-final; 20 September 2008; 27 September 2008; Final; 4 October 2008

Competing entry
- Song: "1 Dag"
- Artist: Marissa

Placement
- Final result: 13th, 27 points

Participation chronology

The Netherlands selected their Junior Eurovision Song Contest entry for 2008 through Junior Songfestival 2008, a national final consisting of 10 songs spread out into two semi-finals and a final. The final winner was Marissa with the song "1 Dag".

== Before Junior Eurovision ==
=== Junior Songfestival 2008 ===
AVRO held a national final to select the Dutch entry for the contest. The contest consisted of two semi-finals and one final. Each semi-final had 5 songs, with 2 advancing to the final: one more entry was then granted access to the final as a wildcard entry, allowing 5 songs to compete in the final.

The three voting groups were awarded as follows to the competing entries:

- Kids jury - A jury of children aged under 16 years
- Jury - A jury of adults aged 16 or over
- Televoting

==== Competing entries ====
Over 1000 songs were submitted to AVRO for the competition. 73 of the artists submitted were asked to attend live auditions, which took place on 28 and 29 April 2008 in Rhenen. 17 entries were selected to go through to the next stage, where a further seven entries were rejected, leaving the final 10 entries that competed in the live shows.

==== Semi-final 1 ====
Semi-final 1 – 20 September 2008
Draw	Artist	Song	Kids Jury	Expert Jury	Televote	Total	Place
1	Suzanne	"Strijd"	12	9	12	33	1
2	Melissa	"Als ik in de lucht kijk"	10	10	10	30	2
3	RReADY	"Musical"	7	12	9	28	3
4	Lauren	"Denk eens aan een ander"	9	7	8	24	4
5	Rick	"Meisje van mijn dromen"	8	8	7	23	5

==== Semi-final 2 ====
Semi-final 2 – 27 September 2008
Draw	Artist	Song	Kids Jury	Expert Jury	Televote	Total	Place
1	Marissa	"1 Dag"	10	12	12	34	1
2	Roufaida	"Vandaag"	12	9	7	28	2
3	Delano	"Doe je ding nu"	9	10	8	27	3
4	Teuntje	"Geef me mijn dromen"	8	7	10	25	4
5	Paola & Claudia	"Dansmena"	7	8	9	24	5

==== Final ====
Final – 4 October 2008
Draw	Artist	Song	Kids Jury	Expert Jury	Televote	Total	Place
1	Suzanne	"Strijd"	9	8	9	26	4
2	Melissa	"Als ik in de lucht kijk"	7	7	7	21	5
3	RReADY	"Musical"	8	10	12	30	2
4	Marissa	"1 Dag"	12	12	10	34	1
5	Roufaida	"Vandaag"	10	9	8	27	3

== Marissa's accident ==
Marissa was later involved in a car accident on 4 November 2008, just over two weeks away from the Contest in Limassol, when she and her sister collided with a car on a scooter. Marissa's leg was placed in plaster after being sprained, however this did not deter her from competing in the contest, with Marissa stating that she would try as much as she can to get to Junior Eurovision, even if she was in a wheelchair. Fortunately it did not come to this, and Marissa was able to perform as normal.

== At Eurovision ==
Marissa performed 11th at the Junior Eurovision Song Contest 2008, performing after Malta and before Ukraine. Marissa received 27 points and finished 13th.

=== Voting ===
Points awarded to the Netherlands
Score	Country
12 points (Note: All countries received one set of 12 points to ensure no country finished with nul points.)	
10 points	
8 points	
7 points	
6 points	
5 points	Belgium; Lithuania
4 points	
3 points	Belarus
2 points	
1 point	Cyprus; Malta

Points awarded by the Netherlands
Score	Country
12 points	Georgia
10 points	Belgium
8 points	Lithuania
7 points	Ukraine
6 points	Malta
5 points	Macedonia
4 points	Belarus
3 points	Armenia
2 points	Romania
1 point	Russia
