= Belarus in the Junior Eurovision Song Contest 2008 =

Contest results

- Junior Eurovision Song Contest 2008
- Country: Belarus
- Selection process: Song for Eurovision
- Selection date: Semi-final: 27 May 2008; Final: 12 September 2008

Competing entry
- Song: "Sertse Belarusi"
- Artist: Dasha, Alina and Karina

Placement
- Final result: 6th, 86 points

Participation chronology

Belarus selected their Junior Eurovision entry for 2008 through Song For Eurovision, a national final consisting of 20 songs which had to qualify through a semi final to get to the final. The winners were Dasha, Alina & Karina with the song Sertse Belarusi.

== Before Junior Eurovision ==
=== Song for Eurovision ===
==== Semi-final ====
The semi-final was pre-recorded on 27 May 2008, then broadcast on 1 June 2008. A jury decided the 10 songs that would go through to the final.

Draw	Artist	Song	Result
1	Diana Gromova	"Ta-Ru-Ram"	Advanced
2	Nikita Zhurovich	"Mechtat"	Advanced
3	Maria Lemeshevskaya	"SMS MMS"	Eliminated
4	Irina Kulagina	"Kupalskaya"	Eliminated
5	Ekaterina Mezhennaya	"Piny Cody"	Eliminated
6	Alina Moshchenko	"Vremya"	Advanced
7	Darya Shulgina	"Tantsuem, tantsuem"	Eliminated
8	Roman Voloznev	"Matulenka"	Eliminated
9	Diana Guzino	"Number One"	Advanced
10	Dmitry Yermuzevich	"Vse my deti zemli"	Eliminated
11	Ekaterina & Dmitry	"A tam, za gorizontom"	Eliminated
12	Serafima Kuznetsova	"Ne unyvai"	Advanced
13	Alina Konareva	"Volshebnie sny"	Eliminated
14	Kirill Yermakov	"Ya poyu dlya vas"	Advanced
15	Darya Mikhailova	"Oda Jazzu"	Eliminated
16	Mikhail Sosunov	"Odnoklassnitsa"	Advanced
17	Maria Dubovskaya	"Romashkiusi"	Eliminated
18	Alexandra Stelmakh	"Molodoe RNB"	Advanced
19	Darya Soroko	"So-Da-Super Star"	Advanced
20	Dasha, Alina, Karina	"Sertse Belarusi"	Advanced

==== Final ====
The final was broadcast live on 12 September 2008. The winning song was decided by 50% Televoting and 50% Jury, however only televoting results were announced, which was won by trio Dasha, Alina and Karina with Diana Gromova finishing 2nd.

Draw	Artist	Song
1	Dasha, Alina, Karina	"Sertse Belarusi"
2	Serafima Kuznetsova	"Ne unyvai"
3	Mikhail Sosunov	"Odnoklassnitsa"
4	Nikita Zhurovich	"Mechtat"
5	Diana Guzino	"Number One"
6	Diana Gromova	"Ta-Ru-Ram"
7	Darya Soroko	"So-Da-Super Star"
8	Alina Moshchenko	"Vremya"
9	Alexandra Stelmakh	"Molodoe RNB"
10	Kirill Yermakov	"Ya poyu dlya vas"

== At Eurovision ==
On 14 October 2008 it was revealed that the Belarusian entry had been allocated spot 3 to perform in the final. At the Junior Eurovision Song Contest 2008 which took place on 22 November 2008, the performers wore dresses identical to the ones they wore at the national final. There were also three dancers which were also featured in the performance at the national final.

=== Voting ===
Points awarded to Belarus
Score	Country
12 points (Note: All countries received one set of 12 points to ensure no country finished with nul points.)	
10 points	Belgium; Russia
8 points	
7 points	Malta; Serbia
6 points	Bulgaria
5 points	Armenia; Macedonia; Romania; Ukraine
4 points	Greece; Netherlands
3 points	Cyprus; Lithuania
2 points	
1 point	

Points awarded by Belarus
Score	Country
12 points	Russia
10 points	Ukraine
8 points	Georgia
7 points	Macedonia
6 points	Lithuania
5 points	Armenia
4 points	Malta
3 points	Netherlands
2 points	Romania
1 point	Belgium
