= Belgium in the Junior Eurovision Song Contest 2008 =

- Junior Eurovision Song Contest 2008
- Participating broadcaster: Vlaamse Radio- en Televisieomroeporganisatie (VRT)
- Country: Belgium
- Selection process: Junior Eurosong 2008
- Selection date: 27 September 2008

Competing entry
- Song: "Shut Up!"
- Artist: Oliver
- Songwriter: Oliver Symons

Placement
- Final result: 11th, 45 points

Participation chronology

Belgium was represented at the Junior Eurovision Song Contest 2008 with the song "Shut Up!", written and performed by Oliver Symons. The Belgian participating broadcaster, Vlaamse Radio- en Televisieomroeporganisatie (VRT), selected its entry for the contest through a national televised competition titled Junior Eurosong 2008.

== Before Eurovision ==
=== Junior Eurosong 2008 ===
Junior Eurosong 2008 was the national competition organised by Belgian broadcaster Vlaamse Radio- en Televisieomroeporganisatie (VRT) to select its entry for the Junior Eurovision Song Contest 2008.

==== Format ====
The format of the competition consisted of four shows: two quarter-finals, one semi-final and a final. All shows were hosted by Ben Roelants.

Results during the heats and the semi-final shows were determined by the three-member jury panel and votes from the public. In the quarter-finals the songs first faced a public televote where the top two entries qualified. The jury then selected an additional qualifier from the remaining entries to proceed in the competition. In the semi-finals the songs first faced a public televote where the top three entries qualified. The jury then selected an additional qualifier from the remaining entries to proceed in the competition. In the final, public televoting exclusively determined the winner.

The jury participated in each show by providing feedback to the competing artists and selecting entries to advance in the competition. The panel consists of:

- Stijn Kolacny
- Pascale Platel
- Andre Vermeulen

==== Competing entries ====
A total of 548 songs were received by VRT for the contest, with only 10 (nine in Dutch and one in French) being chosen to compete in the national final.

Artist	Song (English translation)
Chloé	"Un nouveau rêve" (A new dream)
Didier & Charlotte	"Samen" (Together)
Elke	"Geniet van elk moment" (Enjoy every moment)
Guust	"Ik hou van muziek" (I love music)
Mathilde	"Vergeet-mij-liedje" (Forget-me-song)
MC Louis	"In de echte wereld" (In the real world)
Mystery of Darkness	"Familierock" (Family rock)
Oliver	"Shut Up!"
The Pinsons	"Waarom?" (Why?)
Vince	"Al fluitend door het leven" (Whistling through life)

==== Quarter-final 1 ====
The first quarter-final took place on 6 September 2008. Three entries qualified to the final. The five competing entries first faced a public televote where the top two songs advanced: "Waarom?" performed by The Pinsons and "Vergeet-mij-liedje" performed by Mathilde. An additional qualifier was selected from the remaining three entries by the jury: "Shut Up!" performed by Oliver.

Televote qualifier
Jury qualifier

Quarter-final 1 – 6 September 2008
R/O	Artist	Song	Result
1	Oliver	"Shut Up!"	Qualified
2	Elke	"Geniet van elk moment"	—N/a
3	Vince	"Al fluitend door het leven"	—N/a
4	Mathilde	"Vergeet-mij-liedje"	Qualified
5	The Pinsons	"Waarom?"	Qualified

==== Quarter-final 2 ====
The second quarter-final took place on 13 September 2008. Three entries qualified to the final. The five competing entries first faced a public televote where the top two songs advanced: "Samen" performed by Didier & Charlotte and "Ik hou van muziek" performed by Guust. An additional qualifier was selected from the remaining three entries by the jury: "Un nouveau rêve" performed by Chloé.

Quarter-final 2 – 13 September 2008
R/O	Artist	Song	Result
1	Didier & Charlotte	"Samen"	Qualified
2	Guust	"Ik hou van muziek"	Qualified
3	MC Louis	"In de echte wereld"	—N/a
4	Chloé	"Un nouveau rêve"	Qualified
5	Mystery of Darkness	"Familierock"	—N/a

==== Semi-final ====
The semi-final took place on 20 September 2008. Four entries qualified to the final. The six competing entries first faced a public televote where the top three songs advanced: "Un nouveau rêve" performed by Chloé, "Ik hou van muziek" performed by Guust and "Samen" performed by Didier & Charlotte. An additional qualifier was selected from the remaining six entries by the jury: "Shut Up!" performed by Oliver.

Semi-final – 20 September 2008
R/O	Artist	Song	Result
1	The Pinsons	"Waarom?"	—N/a
2	Mathilde	"Vergeet-mij-liedje"	—N/a
3	Chloé	"Un nouveau rêve"	Qualified
4	Guust	"Ik hou van muziek"	Qualified
5	Didier & Charlotte	"Samen"	Qualified
6	Oliver	"Shut Up!"	Qualified

==== Final ====
The final took place on 27 September 2008. "Shut Up!" performed by Oliver was selected as the winner after accumulating the highest number of televotes.

Winner

Final – 27 September 2008
R/O	Artist	Song	Place
1	Guust	"Ik hou van muziek"	4
2	Chloé	"Un nouveau rêve"	2
3	Oliver	"Shut Up!"	1
4	Didier & Charlotte	"Samen"	3

== At Junior Eurovision ==
At Junior Eurovision, Belgium performed in seventh position, before Bulgaria and after Georgia. The presentation of the Belgian song was changed. Three female dancers and a drummer were introduced to the performance. Belgium placed in 11th position with 45 points; the highest of which was 10 points, which came from the Netherlands.

=== Voting ===
Points awarded to Belgium
Score	Country
12 points (Note: All countries received one set of 12 points to ensure no country finished with nul points.)	
10 points	Netherlands
8 points	
7 points	
6 points	
5 points	
4 points	Georgia; Lithuania
3 points	Serbia
2 points	Armenia; Macedonia; Malta; Romania; Ukraine
1 point	Belarus; Russia

Points awarded by Belgium
Score	Country
12 points	Georgia
10 points	Belarus
8 points	Lithuania
7 points	Malta
6 points	Armenia
5 points	Netherlands
4 points	Macedonia
3 points	Ukraine
2 points	Romania
1 point	Serbia

== After Junior Eurovision ==
After the Belgian national final, Junior Eurosong, "Shut Up!" was released into the Flemish charts. Its peak in the charts was at #19.
