= Cyprus in the Junior Eurovision Song Contest 2008 =

- Junior Eurovision Song Contest 2008
- Participating broadcaster: Cyprus Broadcasting Corporation (CyBC)
- Country: Cyprus
- Selection process: National final
- Selection date: 28 June 2008

Competing entry
- Song: "Gioupi gia!"
- Artist: Elena Mannouri and Charis Savva
- Songwriters: Andreas Georgallis; Elena Mannouri; Charis Savva

Placement
- Final result: 10th, 46 points

Participation chronology

Cyprus was represented at the Junior Eurovision Song Contest 2008 with the song "Gioupi gia!", written by Andreas Georgallis, Elena Mannouri, and Charis Savva, and performed by Elena Mannouri and Charis Savva. The Cypriot participating broadcaster, the Cyprus Broadcasting Corporation (CyBC), selected its entry for the contest through a national final. In addition, CyBC was also the host broadcaster and staged the event at the Spyros Kyprianou Athletic Centre in Limassol.

== Before Junior Eurovision ==
=== National final ===
The Cyprus Broadcasting Corporation (CyBC) opened a submission window for the national final on 7 April 2008 and closed it on 9 May. From the submission window, 36 or 38 entries were received, which of eight were selected to be the finalists by a 7-member jury on 31 May 2008. The song titles were announced on 3 June 2008, and the running order with the performers of the songs were announced on 20 June 2008.

The final was held on 28 June 2008 in the CyBC's Studio 3 at 20:15 CEST and broadcast on RIK 1 and RIK Sat. The show was hosted by Christiana Stavrou and Kyriakos Pastides. The results were decided by 60% televoting and 40% jury. Guest performers included Andreas Christoforou and Yiorgos Ioannides. Participants who didn’t qualify for the final also performed a song composed by Kyriakos Pastides and Marina Charalambous.

Final – 28 June 2008
| R/O | Artist | Song | Jury | Televote | Points | Place |
|---|---|---|---|---|---|---|
| 1 | Angelina Constanti, Ourania Argyrou, Adriana Macri and Anastasia Georgalli | "Thelo ton kosmo na gyriso" ("Θέλω τον κόσμο να γυρίσω") | 16 | 12 | 28 | 7 |
| 2 | Ioanna Drousiotou | "Dose zoi kai chroma" ("Δώσε ζωή και χρώμα") | 4 | 48 | 52 | 3 |
| 3 | Nikolas Argyrou | "To nisi tis Afroditis" ("Το νησί της Αφροδίτης") | 8 | 6 | 14 | 8 |
| 4 | Stefani Christofi | "Tora" ("Τώρα") | 32 | 30 | 62 | 2 |
| 5 | Giannis Karagiannis | "Logia pou piran fotia" ("Λόγια που πήραν φωτιά") | 12 | 36 | 48 | 4 |
| 6 | Nicos Savvides | "Minyma Agapis" ("Μήνυμα Αγάπης") | 24 | 18 | 42 | 6 |
| 7 | Elena Mannouri and Charis Savva | "Gioupi gia" ("Γιούπι για") | 40 | 60 | 100 | 1 |
| 8 | Antonis Poullis | "Petao" ("Πετάω") | 20 | 24 | 44 | 5 |

== At Junior Eurovision ==
At the running order draw on 13 October 2008, Cyprus was drawn to perform second on 22 November 2008, following Macedonia.

=== Voting ===
Points awarded to Cyprus
| Score | Country |
|---|---|
| 12 points (Note: All countries received one set of 12 points to ensure no country finished with nul points.) | Greece |
| 10 points | |
| 8 points | |
| 7 points | |
| 6 points | |
| 5 points | |
| 4 points | Bulgaria; Malta; Romania; Serbia |
| 3 points | Armenia |
| 2 points | Lithuania |
| 1 point | Georgia |

Points awarded by Cyprus
| Score | Country |
|---|---|
| 12 points | Georgia |
| 10 points | Ukraine |
| 8 points | Romania |
| 7 points | Greece |
| 6 points | Malta |
| 5 points | Macedonia |
| 4 points | Russia |
| 3 points | Belarus |
| 2 points | Lithuania |
| 1 point | Netherlands |
