= Romania in the Junior Eurovision Song Contest 2008 =

- Junior Eurovision Song Contest 2008
- Country: Romania
- Selection process: Selecţia Naţională Eurovision Junior 2008
- Selection date: 1 June 2008

Competing entry
- Song: "Salvaţi planeta"
- Artist: Mădălina and Andrada

Placement
- Final result: 9th, 58 points

Participation chronology

Romania was represented by Mădălina & Andrada at the Junior Eurovision Song Contest 2008 with the song "Salvaţi planeta!", a song about saving the planet. "Salvaţi planeta!" was the winner of the Romanian national final Selecţia Naţională Eurovision Junior 2008, held on 1 June 2008.

== Before Junior Eurovision ==
=== Selecţia Naţională Eurovision Junior 2008 ===
The submission window for the national final was open until 30 April 2008. The participants of the final were revealed on 5 May 2008.

The final took place on 1 June 2008, hosted by Alina Sorescu and Iulia Ciobanu. 12 songs took part and the winner was determined by a 50/50 combination of votes from a jury panel and a public televote. The winner was "Salvaţi planeta!" performed by Mădălina & Andrada.

As there was a tie at the end of the voting, the results of the jury vote took precedence.

Final – 1 June 2008
Draw	Artist	Song	Jury	Televote	Total	Place
1	Alina Păun	"Voi cânta pe Broadway"	6	5	11	6
2	Roberta Eniṣor	"Prin Lume"	8	4	12	4
3	Ṣcoala Trupa	"Ṣcoala 45"	1	0	1	11
4	Miraj	"Miraj"	2	7	9	7
5	Thalida	"Pot zbura"	4	3	7	9
6	Lavina & Denisa	"Fete Bune"	7	1	8	8
7	Mădălina & Andrada	"Salvaţi planeta!"	12	10	22	1
8	Gabitzu	"Sărmăluţen'n foi"	0	0	0	12
9	RBL	"Prietene mereu"	5	6	11	5
10	D&D	"Reggaeton-Rocka"	4	8	12	3
11	Georgia Dascăliu	"Copil ṣi inger"	10	12	22	2
12	Diana Căldăraru	"Micul Mozart"	0	2	2	10

=== Revamp of the song ===
The melody of the song has changed slightly from the version sang at the National Final (which can be heard here). The revised version can be heard here.

== At Eurovision ==
On 14 October 2008 the running order for Junior Eurovision took place, and the Romanian song was given the spot to perform first. At Junior Eurovision, the Romanian performers wore dresses symbolising the four seasons and the sky. The presentation was very similar to that of the national final. A giant globe was also used as a prop. The song placed in 9th position with 58 points. The entry also received points from every country, the most being eight points from Cyprus and Macedonia.

=== Voting ===
Points awarded to Romania
Score	Country
12 points (Note: All countries received one set of 12 points to ensure no country finished with nul points.)	
10 points	
8 points	Cyprus; Macedonia
7 points	
6 points	
5 points	Serbia
4 points	Armenia; Ukraine
3 points	Malta
2 points	Belarus; Belgium; Georgia; Greece; Netherlands; Russia
1 point	Bulgaria; Lithuania

Points awarded by Romania
Score	Country
12 points	Ukraine
10 points	Macedonia
8 points	Lithuania
7 points	Malta
6 points	Georgia
5 points	Belarus
4 points	Cyprus
3 points	Armenia
2 points	Belgium
1 point	Serbia
