= Armenia in the Junior Eurovision Song Contest 2008 =

- Junior Eurovision Song Contest 2008
- Country: Armenia
- Selection process: National Final
- Selection date: Quarter-finals: 30 June 2008; 1 July 2008; Semi-final: 6 July 2008; Final: 11 July 2008

Competing entry
- Song: "Im Ergi Hnchyune"
- Artist: Monika Manucharova

Placement
- Final result: 8th, 59 points

Participation chronology

Armenia selected their Junior Eurovision Song Contest 2008 entry by a national final with two quarter-finals, one semi-final and a final. The winner was Monika Manucharova with "Im Ergy Hnchyune", which represented Armenia in the Junior Eurovision Song Contest 2008 on 22 November 2008.

== Before Junior Eurovision ==
=== National final ===
A submission period for artists was held until 5 May 2008. 200 applications were received, and 36 entries were chosen for the national final.

==== Quarter-final 1 ====
The first quarter-final was held on 30 June 2008, hosted by Felix and Emmy. Eighteen songs competed and an "expert" jury chose 10 songs to qualify for the semi-final.

Draw	Artist	Song (English title)	Result
1	Nadezhda & Mary	"Me and You"	Eliminated
2	Serine Hodikyan	"How"	Advanced
3	Arevik Asatryan	"Crazy Dancers"	Eliminated
4	Suzanna Antonyan	"Blue Sky"	Eliminated
5	MMS	"Step by step"	Eliminated
6	Ani & Alisa	"Hello"	Advanced
7	Mary Arzumanyan	"Child's Smile"	Eliminated
8	Marine Markaryan	"My Song - Fary Tale"	Eliminated
9	Larisa Gevorkyan	"Crazy Girl"	Advanced
10	Zangak	"Laugh"	Eliminated
11	Mary Mndjoyan	"Child's Days"	Advanced
12	Diana Bagdasaryan	"Rock'n'Roll"	Advanced
13	David Gukasyan	"Me and Me"	Advanced
14	Emma Kazaryan	"My Song"	Advanced
15	Hovsanna Hublaryan	"Wings of Hope"	Eliminated
16	Arsen Nahapetyan	"Song - you're my life"	Advanced
17	Do-Re-Mi	"Chocolate"	Advanced
18	Artashes Muradyan	"Captain From Fairy-tale"	Advanced

==== Quarter-final 2 ====
The second quarter-final was held on 1 July 2008, hosted by Felix and Emmy. Eighteen songs competed and an "expert" jury chose 10 songs to qualify for the semi-final.

Draw	Artist	Song (English title)	Result
1	Do-Re-Mi	"My Little Cloud"	Advanced
2	Arevik Asatryan	"Dream"	Eliminated
3	Plus-Minus	"My Dream"	Advanced
4	Erna Mirzoyan	"Happy Song"	Advanced
5	Goar Gevorkyan	"Request"	Advanced
6	Gayane Keryan	"White Dolphin"	Eliminated
7	Nadezhda Sargsyan	"Give Me A Hand"	Eliminated
8	Syurpriz	"Fairy Tale"	Advanced
9	Inessa Kocharyan	"Spring"	Advanced
10	Anahit Petrosyan	"Echo"	Eliminated
11	Mary Martirosyan	"Smile"	Advanced
12	Luara Airapetyan	"My Song"	Advanced
13	Anush Karapetyan	"Tired"	Eliminated
14	Monika Manucharova	"Sounds of My Song"	Advanced
15	Marine, Larisa & Emma	"Three Sisters"	Eliminated
16	Tamara Lalayan	"Song In My Soul"	Advanced
17	Siranush Grigoryan	"Hello To The Sun"	Eliminated
18	Do-Re-Mi	"Sara-Bara-Du"	Advanced

==== Semi-final ====
The semi-final was held on 6 July 2008, hosted by Felix and Emmy. The eighteen songs which qualified from the two quarter-finals competed and an "expert" jury chose 10 songs to qualify for the final.

Draw	Artist	Song (English title)	Result
1	Arsen Nahapetyan	"Song - you're my life"	Eliminated
2	Do-Re-Mi	"My Little Cloud"	Eliminated
3	Erna Mirzoyan	"Happy Song"	Eliminated
4	Inessa Kocharyan	"Spring"	Eliminated
5	Serine Hodikyan	"How"	Advanced
6	Goar Gevorkyan	"Request"	Advanced
7	Plus-Minus	"My Dream"	Advanced
8	Mary Martirosyan	"Smile"	Eliminated
9	Ani & Alisa	"Hello"	Eliminated
10	Luara Airapetyan	"My Song"	Advanced
11	Artashes Muradyan	"Captain From Fairy-tale"	Advanced
12	Emma Kazaryan	"My Song"	Advanced
13	Tamara Lalayan	"Song In My Soul"	Eliminated
14	Mary Mndjoyan	"Child's Days"	Advanced
15	Do-Re-Mi	"Sara-Bara-Du"	Advanced
16	Diana Bagdasaryan	"Rock'N'Roll"	Eliminated
17	Monica Manucharova	"Sounds of My Song"	Advanced
18	Syurpriz	"Fairy Tale"	Eliminated
19	Larisa Gevorkyan	"Crazy Girl"	Eliminated
20	David Gukasyan	"Me and Me"	Eliminated
21	Do-Re-Me	"Chocolate"	Advanced

==== Final ====
The final was held on 11 July 2008, hosted by Felix and Emmy. The ten songs which qualified from the two quarter-finals competed and the winner was chosen by a combination of televoting and the votes from an "expert" jury.

Draw	Artist	Song
1	Artashes Muradyan	"Hekiatneri navapety"
2	Plus-Minus	"Im erezanq"
3	Do-Re-Mi	"Sara-Bara-Bu"
4	Goar Gevorgyan	"Hndrank"
5	Serine Hodikyan	"Inchpes"
6	Mery Mndjoyan	"Mankutyan orer"
7	Monica Manucharova	"Im ergy hnchyune"
8	Luara Hayrapetyan	"Im ergy"
9	Emma Kazaryan	"Im ergy"
10	Nadezhda Sargsyan & Friends	"Shokolad"

== At Junior Eurovision ==
Since the song was performed in the national final, the lyrics have been changed, as well as the melody. The song title was changed from "Im Ergy Hnchuny" to "Im Ergy Hnchyune". Armenia was drawn to perform in spot two. As well as the singer on stage, like in the national final, there were two dancers and two backing singers; one of them was the songwriter. The animation on the screen behind them also appeared in the preview video. The song placed in the 8th position with 59 points, which were received from Belgium, Netherlands, Cyprus, Romania, Russia, Ukraine, Belarus, Bulgaria and Georgia.

=== Voting ===
Points awarded to Armenia
Score	Country
12 points (Note: All countries received one set of 12 points to ensure no country finished with nul points.)	
10 points	
8 points	Georgia
7 points	Bulgaria
6 points	Belgium; Greece; Russia
5 points	Belarus
4 points	
3 points	Netherlands; Romania; Ukraine
2 points	
1 point	

Points awarded by Armenia
Score	Country
12 points	Georgia
10 points	Russia
8 points	Ukraine
7 points	Malta
6 points	Macedonia
5 points	Belarus
4 points	Romania
3 points	Cyprus
2 points	Belgium
1 point	Serbia
