= Georgia in the Junior Eurovision Song Contest 2008 =

- Junior Eurovision Song Contest 2008
- Participating broadcaster: Georgian Public Broadcaster (GPB)
- Country: Georgia
- Selection process: National selection
- Selection date: 4 October 2008

Competing entry
- Song: "Bzz.."
- Artist: Bzikebi
- Songwriters: Mariam Kikuashvili; Mariam Talulashvili; Giorgi Shiolashvili

Placement
- Final result: 1st, 154 points

Participation chronology

Georgia was represented at the Junior Eurovision Song Contest 2008 with the song "Bzz....", written by Mariam Kikuashvili, Mariam Talulashvili, and Giorgi Shiolashvili, and performed by themselves as Bzikebi. The Georgian participating broadcaster, the Georgian Public Broadcaster (GPB), selected its entry for the contest through a national final. The song won the contest with 154 points.

== Background ==
Prior to the 2008 contest, the Georgian Public Broadcaster (GPB) had participated in the Junior Eurovision Song Contest representing Georgia once, in 2007, being represented by the song "Odelia Ranuni" performed by Mariam Romelashvili, placing fourth with 116 points.

== Before Junior Eurovision ==
=== National final ===
GPB selected its entry for the Junior Eurovision Song Contest 2008 using a national selection consisting of nine songs. The winner was the song "Bzz..", written and performed by trio Bzikebi.

Final – 4 October 2008
R/O	Artist	Song
1	Shatalo	"Chen Virchevt Adgils"
2	Ia Orjonikidze	"Harale"
3	Patriotebi	"Rivore"
4	Krimanchuli	"Leqsi Saxumaro"
5	Gogoebi	"Telephonis Jazi"
6	Bzikebi	"Bzz.."
7	Mariam Kakhelishvili	"De"
8	Baptiani Gitarebi	"Urchi Sikvaruli"
9	Sopho	"Chemi Varskvlavi"

== At Junior Eurovision ==
During the running order draw which took place on 14 October 2008, Georgia was drawn to perform sixth on 22 November 2008, following Greece and preceding Belgium.

=== Final ===
During the final, Bzikebi performed downstage in outfits combining both yellow and black, resembling bees. Bzikebi won the Junior Eurovision Song Contest 2008, receiving 154 points for their song "Bzz..".

=== Voting ===
Points awarded to Georgia
Score	Country
12 points (Note: All countries received one set of 12 points to ensure no country finished with nul points.)	Armenia; Belgium; Bulgaria; Cyprus; Lithuania; Netherlands; Russia; Ukraine
10 points	Greece; Serbia
8 points	Belarus; Malta
7 points	
6 points	Romania
5 points	
4 points	Macedonia
3 points	
2 points	
1 point	

Points awarded by Georgia
Score	Country
12 points	Ukraine
10 points	Lithuania
8 points	Armenia
7 points	Malta
6 points	Serbia
5 points	Russia
4 points	Belgium
3 points	Macedonia
2 points	Romania
1 point	Cyprus
