= Macedonia in the Junior Eurovision Song Contest 2008 =

- Junior Eurovision Song Contest 2008
- Participating broadcaster: Macedonian Radio Television (MRT)
- Country: Macedonia
- Selection process: National final
- Selection date: 20 September 2008

Competing entry
- Song: "Prati mi SMS"
- Artist: Bobi Andonov
- Songwriter: Bobi Andonov

Placement
- Final result: 5th, 93 points

Participation chronology

Macedonia (Note: Presented under the provisional appellation "former Yugoslav Republic of Macedonia", abbreviated "FYR Macedonia".) was represented at the Junior Eurovision Song Contest 2008 with the song "Prati mi SMS", written and performed by Bobi Andonov. The Macedonian participating broadcaster, Macedonian Radio Television (MRT), selected its entry for the contest through a national final.

== Before Junior Eurovision ==
=== National final ===
The final took place on 20 September 2008, hosted by Gorast Cvetkovski and Ivona Bogoevska. Twelve songs competed and the winner was decided by a combination of votes from a jury panel (50%) and televoting (50%).

Final – 20 September 2008
R/O	Artist	Song	Songwriter(s)	Jury		Televote		Total	Place
1	Petar Gjurovski	"Sonuvam" ("Сонувам")	Petar Gjurovski	38	7	749	8	15	4
2	Gorazd Grmaškovski	"Ajde gore race" ("Ајде горе раце")	Gorazd Grmaškovski	24	2	85	0	2	11
3	Bisera Bazer	"Sever-jug" ("Север-југ")	Bisera Bazer	29	4	364	6	10	6
4	Dejana, Blagoja and Sara	"Pejte so nas" ("Пејте со нас")	Dejana; Blagoja; Sara	29	5	809	10	15	3
5	Dorijan and Filipa	"Srechni sme" ("Среќни сме")	Dorijan Dlaka	45	10	538	7	17	2
6	Nataša Latinovska	"Parička" ("Паричка")	Nataša Latinovska	28	3	35	0	3	10
7	Mirjana Burnaz	"Simpatijo moja" ("Симпатијо моја")	Mirjana Burnaz	17	0	118	1	1	12
8	Mila Milivojević and Bubalici	"Učiliste najmilo" ("Училисте најмило")	Mila Milivojević	44	8	265	5	13	5
9	Marija Zafirovska	"Mojot as" ("Мојот ас")	Marija Zafirovska	34	6	144	2	8	7
10	Marija and Nataša	"Srechen Den" ("Среќен Ден")	Marija Gruevska; Nataša Aleksoska	22	1	223	3	4	9
11	Bobi Andonov	"Prati mi SMS" ("Прати ми СМС")	Bobi Andonov	49	12	1,162	12	24	1
12	Aneta and Maja	"Ljubov moja" ("Љубов моја")	Boris Kakurinov; Nikola Danev	19	0	234	4	4	8

== At Junior Eurovision ==
On 14 October 2008 the running order for Junior Eurovision took place, and the Macedonian song was given the spot to perform fourteenth. The song placed in 5th position with 93 points, which is the country's best result to date. The entry also received points from every country, the most being ten points from Romania.

=== Voting ===
Points awarded to Macedonia
Score	Country
12 points (Note: All countries received one set of 12 points to ensure no country finished with nul points.)	
10 points	Romania
8 points	Serbia; Ukraine
7 points	Belarus
6 points	Armenia; Lithuania
5 points	Bulgaria; Cyprus; Greece; Malta; Netherlands
4 points	Belgium; Russia
3 points	Georgia
2 points	
1 point	

Points awarded by Macedonia
Score	Country
12 points	Serbia
10 points	Lithuania
8 points	Romania
7 points	Ukraine
6 points	Malta
5 points	Belarus
4 points	Georgia
3 points	Bulgaria
2 points	Belgium
1 point	Russia
