= Malta in the Junior Eurovision Song Contest 2008 =

- Junior Eurovision Song Contest 2008
- Participating broadcaster: Public Broadcasting Services (PBS)
- Country: Malta
- Selection process: Junior Eurosong 08
- Selection date: 13 September 2008

Competing entry
- Song: "Junior Swing"
- Artist: Daniel Testa
- Songwriter: Daniel Testa

Placement
- Final result: 4th, 100 points

Participation chronology

Malta was represented at the Junior Eurovision Song Contest 2008 with the song "Junior Swing", written and performed by Daniel Testa. The Maltese participating broadcaster, Public Broadcasting Services (PBS), selected its entry for the contest through Junior Eurosong 08, a national final consisting of 16 songs.

== Before Junior Eurovision ==
=== Junior Eurosong 08 ===
Junior Eurosong 2008 was the national final format developed by Public Broadcasting Services (PBS) to select its entry for the Junior Eurovision Song Contest 2008.

==== Competing entries ====
Artists and composers were able to submit their entries between 7 and 8 August 2008. Artists were able to submit up to two songs, however, they could only compete with one song in the national final. PBS received 74 entries, and 36 songs were selected to compete in the semi-finals.

==== Semi-finals ====
Two semi-finals took place on 9 and 11 September 2008, each featuring eighteen entries. Sixteen entries qualified for the final on 13 September 2008. Six juries (consisting of four adults and two kids) evaluated the songs during the shows and each jury had an equal stake in the final result. A seventh set of votes were the results of the public televote, which had a weighing equal to the votes of a single jury. The six members of the jury that evaluated the entries during both the semi-finals consisted of:

- Jesmond Baldacchino
- Simon Fenech
- Mark Andrews
- Annabelle Debono
- Michaela Attard (Kids Jury)
- Whitney Grech (Kids Jury)

==== Semi-final 1 ====
The first semi-final took place on 9 September 2008 where eighteen songs competed for eight spots in the final.

R/O	Artist	Song	Result
1	Jade Cini	"Do It for Me"	—N/a
2	Antonella Rapa	"Cinderella"	—N/a
3	Francesca Zarb	"Teenagers"	Qualified (Note: It is unclear why "Teenager" qualified instead of "I Dream Awake", meaning nine entries qualified from the first semi-final and seven qualified from the second semi-final, despite eight entries were supposed to qualify from each.)
4	Denise Spiteri	"Eastern Breeze"	Qualified
5	Angelica Portelli	"A Dream"	Qualified
6	Scarlet	"Don't Hurt Us"	Qualified
7	Marisa Galea	"Sing"	Qualified
8	Josmar Cassar	"Id-dinja tiegħi"	—N/a
9	Natalia Gili	"Magical Shoes"	—N/a
10	Claire Azzopardi	"Rainbow Love"	—N/a
11	Jade Cini	"Endless Voices"	Qualified
12	Yazmin Helledie	"Let's Have Some Fun"	—N/a
13	Jodie	"The Zoo"	Qualified
14	Daniel Testa	"Holiday Express"	—N/a
15	Ana	"Shout"	—N/a
16	Marie-Claire	"In My Heart"	Qualified
17	Ylenia Vella	"I Can't Live Without You"	Qualified
18	Whitney & Jody	"Believe In You"	—N/a

==== Semi-final 2 ====
The second semi-final took place on 11 September 2008 where eighteen songs competed for eight spots in the final.

R/O	Artist	Song	Result
1	Danica Muscat	"Touch of Joy"	—N/a
2	Mariah Mifsud Bonnici	"Music of Your Heart"	—N/a
3	Norbert Bondin	"Young and Free"	—N/a
4	Naomi Marie Bugeja	"Mr. DJ"	—N/a
5	Francesca Sciberras	"Fulfill My Dream"	Qualified
6	Shieradye Micallef	"Singing in the Street"	Qualified
7	Daphne Xuereb	"Summer Fun"	—N/a
8	Francesca Zarb	"I Dream Awake"	—N/a
9	Daniel Testa	"Junior Swing"	Qualified
10	Danica Muscat	"Trust and Believe"	Qualified
11	Nicole Azzopardi	"Good Times"	Qualified
12	Bernice Ann Mercieca	"Pray"	—N/a
13	Denise Spiteri	"City of Angels"	—N/a
14	Joseph Refalo	"Tonight"	—N/a
15	Yazmin Helledie	"Fly"	Qualified
16	Antonella Abela	"The Land of Make Believe"	Qualified
17	Christian Muscat & Maria Cuschieri	"Sing Your Life"	—N/a
18	Nicole Azzopardi	"Once Upon a Time"	—N/a

==== Final ====
The final took place on 13 September 2008. The votes of an eight-member jury panel (8/9) and the results of public televoting (1/9) determined the winner. Eight juries (consisting of four adults and four kids) evaluated the songs during the shows and each jury had an equal stake in the final result. A seventh set of votes were the results of the public televote, which had a weighing equal to the votes of a single jury. The eight members of the jury that evaluated the entries during the final consisted of:

- Sigmund Mifsud
- Moyra Felice
- Debbie Scerri
- J. Anvil
- Yorika Attard (Kids Jury)
- Jake Cortis (Kids Jury)
- Deborah Faye Mercieca (Kids Jury)
- Darren Deneo (Kids Jury)

R/O	Artist	Song	Points	Place
1	Shieradye Micallef	"Singing in the Street"	73	7
2	Francesca Zarb	"Teenagers"	63	11
3	Angelica Portelli	"A Dream"	35	16
4	Denise Spiteri	"Eastern Breeze"	73	7
5	Francesca Sciberras	"Fulfill My Dream"	64	10
6	Ylenia Vella	"I Can't Live Without You"	111	4
7	Marisa Galea	"Sing"	106	5
8	Jodie	"The Zoo"	119	2
9	Yazmin Helledie	"Fly"	118	3
10	Jade Cini	"Endless Voices"	42	14
11	Antonella Abela	"The Land of Make Believe"	61	12
12	Danica Muscat	"Trust and Believe"	85	6
13	Daniel Testa	"Junior Swing"	140	1
14	Marie-Claire	"In My Heart"	39	15
15	Nicole Azzopardi	"Good Times"	68	9
16	Scarlet	"Don't Hurt Us"	54	13

== At Eurovision ==
On 14 October 2008 the running order for Junior Eurovision took place, and the Maltese song was given the spot to perform in the tenth position; the same as in the 2007 contest. Daniel Testa reached to end up in the fourth place, the best position for Malta in this contest. This was also the best European result for Malta since Chiara's second position placing in the Eurovision Song Contest 2005.

=== Voting ===
Points awarded to Malta
Score	Country
12 points (Note: All countries received one set of 12 points to ensure no country finished with nul points.)	
10 points	Ukraine
8 points	Bulgaria
7 points	Armenia; Belgium; Georgia; Greece; Lithuania; Romania
6 points	Cyprus; Macedonia; Netherlands
5 points	Russia
4 points	Belarus
3 points	
2 points	
1 point	Serbia

Points awarded by Malta
Score	Country
12 points	Ukraine
10 points	Lithuania
8 points	Georgia
7 points	Belarus
6 points	Russia
5 points	Macedonia
4 points	Cyprus
3 points	Romania
2 points	Belgium
1 point	Netherlands
