= Russia in the Junior Eurovision Song Contest 2008 =

- Junior Eurovision Song Contest 2008
- Country: Russia
- Selection process: National Final
- Selection date: 1 June 2008

Competing entry
- Song: "Spit angel"
- Artist: Mikhail Puntov

Placement
- Final result: 7th, 73 points

Participation chronology

Russia was represented at the Junior Eurovision Song Contest 2008 in Lemesos, Cyprus. The Russian entry was selected through a national final, organised by Russian broadcaster All-Russia State Television and Radio Company (VGTRK). The final was held on 1 June 2008. Mikhail Puntov and his song "Spit angel" won the national final, getting 10.81% of votes.

== Before Junior Eurovision ==
=== National Final ===
On 2 March 2008, VGTRK announced that a national final would be held to select Russia' entry for the Junior Eurovision Song Contest 2008. A submission period for interested artists was opened and lasted until 20 April 2008. A professional jury selected twenty artists and songs from the applicants to proceed to the televised national final.

The selected artists and songs competed at the national final which took place on 1 June 2008 at the "Rossiya" concert hall in Moscow, hosted by Oskar Kuchera and Oksana Fedorova. In addition to the performances from the competitors, the show featured guest performances by Masha Pestunova, Aleksandra Golovchenko, Vlad Krutskikh and Tolmachevy Sisters. The members of the jury were Yury Entin, Artur Gasparyan, Gennady Gokhstein and Grygory Gladkov.

Final – 1 June 2008
Draw	Artist	Song	Percentage	Place
1	Band "Robinzon"	"Solntse"	3.21%	15
2	Mahtin Bayor	"Pesnya odinokogo filina"	6.93%	4
3	Music Theater "DoMiSol'ka"	"Tsvetik-semitsvetik"	2.70%	16
4	Mikhail Puntov	"Spit angel"	10.81%	1
5	Mariya Kovylova	"Angely"	7.21%	3
6	Anastasiya Gavrilina	"Kosy"	5.64%	12
7	Band "Vei-ko"	"Vei-ko-ko"	3.41%	14
8	David Kazaryan	"Poraduemsya solntsu"	6.39%	5
9	Aleksey Vasilyev	"Supergeroy"	2.58%	17
10	Duet "Podruzhki"	"Moya Zemlya"	5.71%	10
11	Ilya Altuhov	"Stop, mashina"	6.37%	6
12	Duet "Plus and minus"	"Matematik"	1.04%	20
13	Ivan Gromozdin	"Stantsui mnye sambu"	2.07%	18
14	Anastasiya Schenina	"Yuzhniy veter"	5.51%	11
15	Olesya Polischuk	"Vesnyanochka"	5.86%	8
16	Ekaterina Sergunina	"Tantsui so mnoy rock-n-roll"	5.77%	9
17	Liza and Dasha Lemeshevy	"Babulya"	1.17%	19
18	Show Band "Kinder syurpriz"	"Oh uz eta shkola"	7.38%	2
19	Snezhana Horolya	"Salehard"	4.36%	13
20	Andrey Chobitko	"Ya risuyu"	5.88%	7

== At Junior Eurovision ==
During the allocation draw on 14 October 2008, Russia was drawn to perform 4th, following Belarus and preceding Greece. Russia placed 7th, scoring 73 points.

Mikhail Puntov was joined on stage by dancers from band "Volshebniki Dvora".

In Russia, show were broadcast on Russia-1 with commentary by Olga Shelest. The Russian spokesperson revealing the result of the Russian vote was Sarina Urman.

=== Voting ===
Points awarded to Russia
Score	Country
12 points (Note: All countries received one set of 12 points to ensure no country finished with nul points.)	Belarus
10 points	Armenia
8 points	Lithuania
7 points	Ukraine
6 points	Malta
5 points	Georgia
4 points	Cyprus
3 points	Greece
2 points	Bulgaria; Serbia
1 point	Macedonia; Netherlands

Points awarded by Russia
Score	Country
12 points	Georgia
10 points	Belarus
8 points	Ukraine
7 points	Lithuania
6 points	Armenia
5 points	Malta
4 points	Macedonia
3 points	Serbia
2 points	Romania
1 point	Belgium

== Mikhail Puntov ==
Mikhail Aleksandrovich Puntov
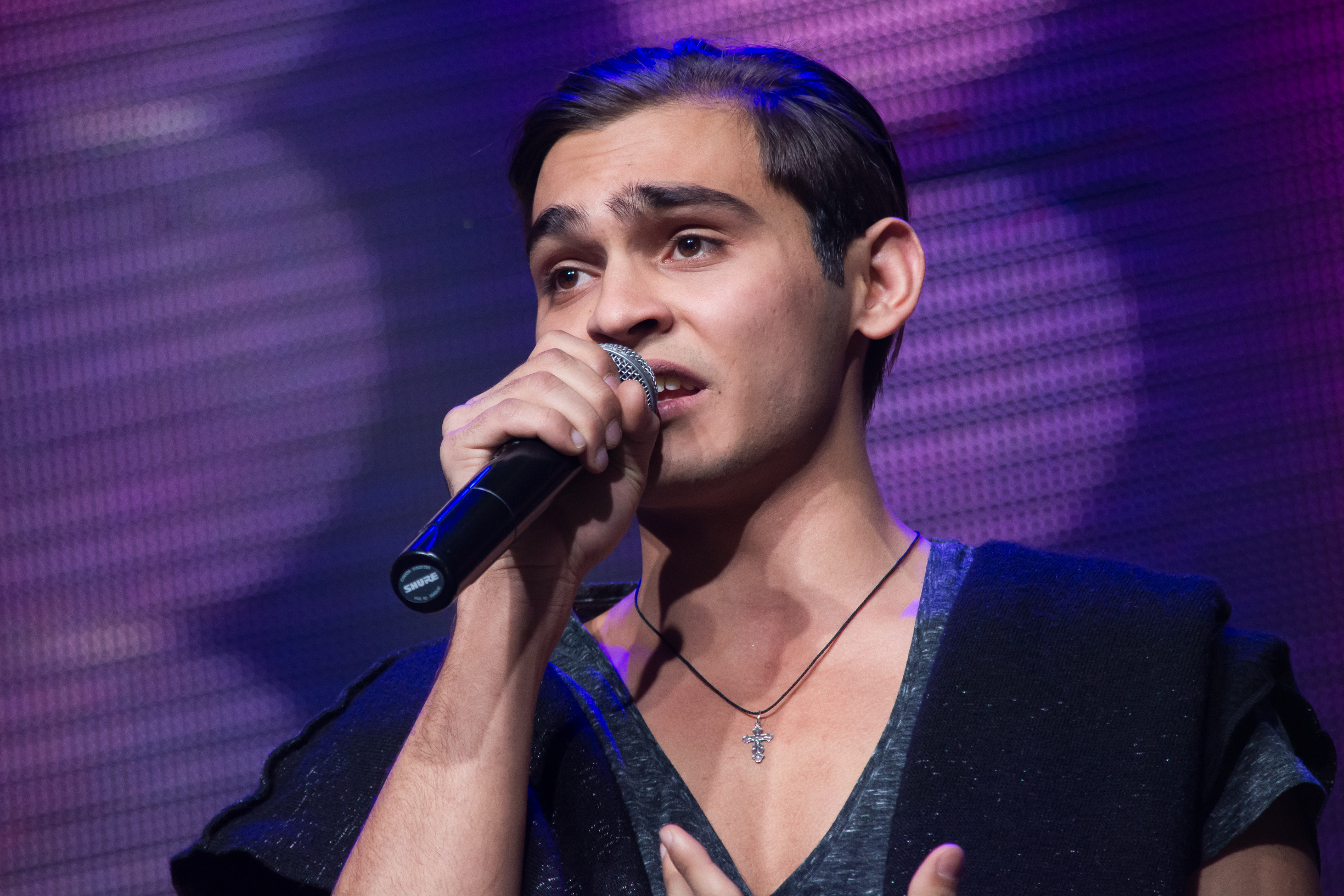

Background information
- Born: Mikhail Aleksandrovich Puntov; December 23, 1994 (age 30); Krasny Sulin, Rostov Oblast, Russia
- Instrument: Vocals
- Years active: 2007–present (singer)

Mikhail Aleksandrovich Puntov (Russian: Михаил Александрович Пунтов; born 23 December 1994, Krasny Sulin, Rostov Oblast, Russian Federation) competed in the 2008-edition of Junior Eurovision Song Contest with the song Spit Angel (Sleeping Angel). In the final in Limasol the then 12-year-old Mikhail came 7th out of 15 contestants, scoring 73 points. At that time Mikhail was a member of the group Street Magic just like Vlad Krutskikh who represented Russia in 2005. The background vocals were some other members of Street Magic: Seva Terasov (also one of the writers of Spit Angel) and Andrei Raspopov. Nowadays Mikhail together with Vlad, Seva, and Andrei form the band Geroi.
