= Bulgaria in the Junior Eurovision Song Contest 2008 =

- Junior Eurovision Song Contest 2008
- Participating broadcaster: Bulgarian National Television (BNT)
- Country: Bulgaria
- Selection process: Konkurs za Bŭlgarska detska pesen na Evroviziya 2008
- Selection date: 18 September 2008

Competing entry
- Song: "Edna mechta"
- Artist: Krastyana Krasteva
- Songwriter: Krastyana Krasteva

Placement
- Final result: 15th, 15 points

Participation chronology

Bulgaria was represented at the Junior Eurovision Song Contest 2008 with the song "Edna mechta", written and performed by Krastyana Krasteva. The Bulgarian participating broadcaster, Bulgarian National Television (BNT), selected its entry for the contest through a national final held on 18 September 2008.

== Before Junior Eurovision ==
=== Konkurs za Bŭlgarska detska pesen na Evroviziya 2008 ===
The Bulgarian National Television (BNT) opened the submission window for the national final for until 31 March 2008. From all songs submitted to BNT, an expert committee selected ten songs for the competition. After the list was released, Ani Svetlozarova Petrova with "Mechta" and Natalia Danielova Vladimirova with "Morska zabava" withdrew from the competition. As a result of this, Usmivka with "Usmivkata" and Krastyana Krasteva with "Edna mechta" participated in the national final instead.

==== Final ====
The final took place on 18 September 2008 at 19:55 CEST in the Hall 2 of the National Palace of Culture in Sofia and was broadcast on BNT 1 and BNT Sat. The show was hosted by Uti Bachvarov, Victoria Terziyska, Tanya Zhelyazkova and Simeon Zhelyazkov. Ten songs competed and the winner was determined by public televoting. Guest performers were Deep Zone and Balthazar with "DJ, Take Me Away", Martin Yordanov and MS with "Kasano chestno", Tatyana and Simeon Zhelyazkovi with "You're the One That I Want", Veda junior, Victoria Terziyska, Bon-Bon with "Pop Til U Drop" and "Break It Up". Voting was open for 10 minutes, and at the conclusion of the voting, "Edna mechta" performed by Krastyana Krasteva was the winner, receiving almost 45% of the public vote.

Final – 18 September 2008
R/O	Artist	Song	Songwriter(s)	Televote	Place
1	Kalina Stancheva and Dens zon	"Malka mis" ("Малка мис")	Kalina Stancheva	1.71%	9
2	Stefani Ilieva and Priyatelki	"Krilata pesen" ("Крилата песен")	Stefani Ilieva	4.98%	6
3	Hrista Georgieva and Peeshti kambanki	"Muzika" ("Музика")	Hrista Georgieva	5.09%	5
4	Triksi	"Pod dagata" ("Под дъгата")	Triksi	3.75%	7
5	Usmivka	"Usmivkata" ("Усмивката")	Bozhidara Simeonova; Hristi Petrova; Paola Peevska	15.37%	2
6	Donika Stratieva	"Lyatno parti" ("Лятно парти")	Donika Stratieva; Sara Panosyan	3.35%	8
7	Kristina Sabeva	"Neka bŭdem po-dobri" ("Да бъдем по-добри")	Kristina Sabeva	6.83%	4
8	Teodora Traycheva	"Pŭrva sreshta" ("Първа среща")	Teodora Traycheva	1.52%	10
9	Krastyana Krasteva and Patilantsi	"Edna mechta ("Една мечта")	Krastyana Krasteva	44.65%	1
10	Peeshti kengura	"Lud kupon" ("Луд купон")	Peeshti kengura	12.75%	3

=== Controversy ===
Prior to the pre-selection local Bulgarian newspaper, Trud, accused organizers of fixing the selection process in favour of the eventual winner, Krastyana Krasteva. A member of the pre-selection committee, Svetoslav Loboshki, denied the accusation, stating, "The article is based on false assumptions of the journalist or is an improper publicity stunt by some of the parents, whose children are involved in preselection".

== At Junior Eurovision ==
At Junior Eurovision, Bulgaria performed in the eighth slot.

=== Voting ===
Points awarded to Bulgaria
Score	Country
12 points (Note: All countries received one set of 12 points to ensure no country finished with nul points.)	
10 points	
8 points	
7 points	
6 points	
5 points	
4 points	
3 points	Macedonia
2 points	
1 point	

Points awarded by Bulgaria
Score	Country
12 points	Georgia
10 points	Ukraine
8 points	Malta
7 points	Armenia
6 points	Belarus
5 points	Macedonia
4 points	Cyprus
3 points	Lithuania
2 points	Russia
1 point	Romania
