= Eglė Jurgaitytė =

Lithuanian singer

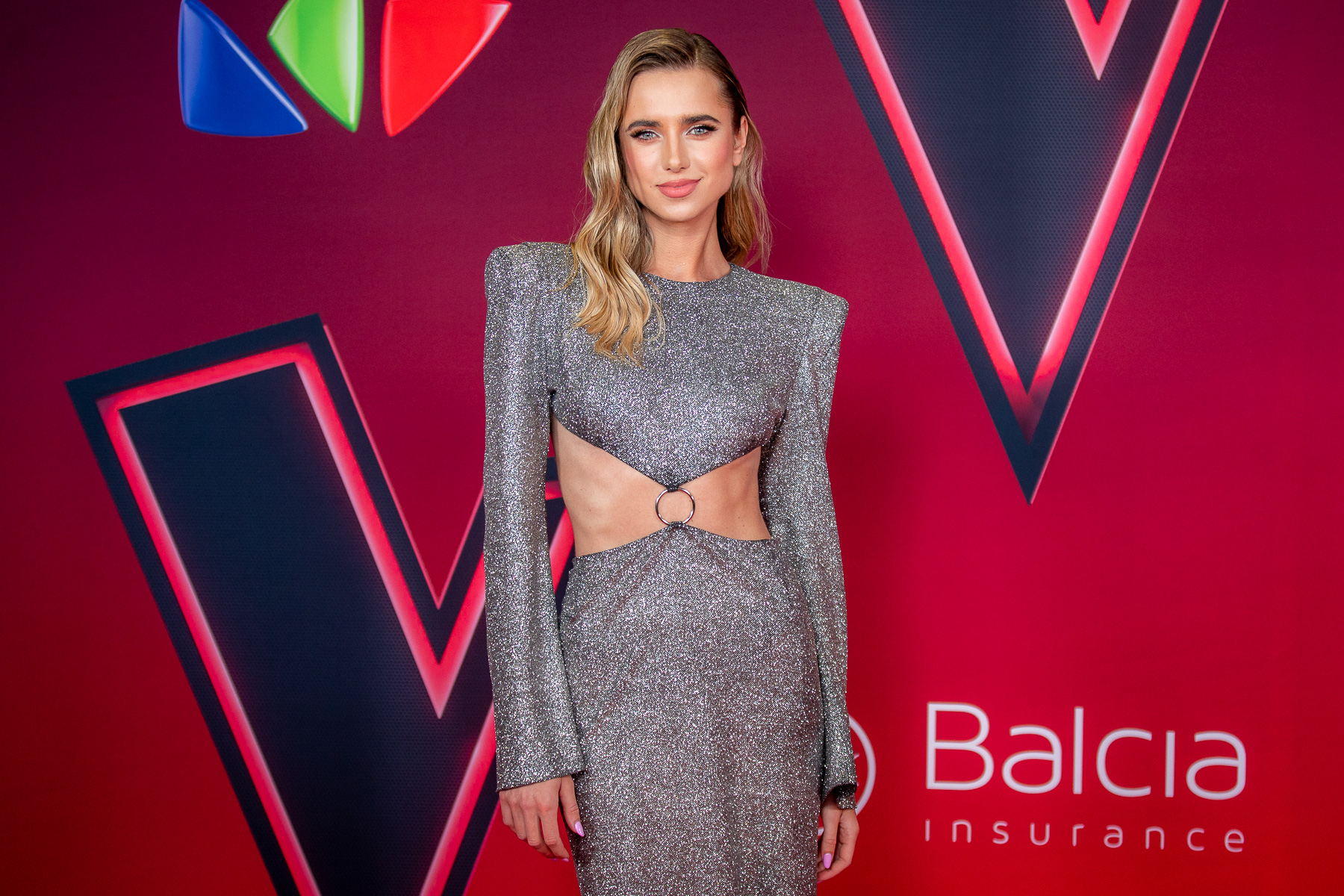

Background information
- Also known as: EGLLE
- Born: January 24, 1998 (age 27); Vilnius, Lithuania
- Genres: Pop
- Occupation(s): Singer, radio presenter
- Instrument: Vocals
- Years active: 2002–present

Eglė Jurgaitytė (born 24 January 1998, in Vilnius) is a Lithuanian singer and radio presenter. At the age of 10, Jurgaitytė represented Lithuania at Junior Eurovision Song Contest 2008, taking 3rd place.

== Career ==
She started her singer career in 2002 when she was just four years old. In 2007 and 2008 Jurgaitytė participated at Lithuanian National Radio and Television talent show, Mažųjų žvaigždžių ringas 3", and reached final.

In 2008 she won national Lithuanian selection for Junior Eurovision Song Contest 2008 and represented Lithuania in the contest. In the final, she sang her song "Laiminga diena" (lit. 'Happy day') and finished in 3rd place.

In 2010, she participated in TV3 project "Chorų karai" (Lithuanian format of "Clash of the Choirs") where she was leader of second capital city choir of Vilnius. Jurgaitytė's producer is famous N.E.O. vocalist Raigardas Tautkus.

In 2018 she participated in the Lithuanian edition of The Voice and finished second.

As of 2021, Jurgaitytė presents a basketball themed radio programme, Žalgiris“ and a morning show on ZIP FM.

As of 2022, Jurgaitytė presents a web series "Tiek žinių" on YouTube TV channel "Laisvės TV" ("Freedom TV"). Since 2023 Jurgaitytė is presenting basketball news on Žalgiris TV.

== See also ==
- Lithuania in the Junior Eurovision Song Contest
- Junior Eurovision Song Contest 2008

Awards and achievements
Preceded by Lina Joy with "Kai miestas snaudžia"	Lithuania in the Junior Eurovision Song Contest; 2008	Succeeded by Bartas with "Oki-Doki"
