= Junior Eurovision Song Contest 2008 =

International song competition for youth

- Fun in the Sun

Date and venue
- Final: 22 November 2008
- Venue: Spyros Kyprianou Athletic Centre; Limassol, Cyprus

Organisation
- Organiser: European Broadcasting Union (EBU)
- Executive supervisor: Svante Stockselius

Production
- Host broadcaster: Cyprus Broadcasting Corporation (CyBC)
- Director: Klitos Klitou
- Executive producer: Munro Forbes
- Presenters: Alex Michael; Sophia Paraskeva

Participants
- Number of entries: 15
- Non-returning countries: Portugal; Sweden
- Participation map: Competing countries Countries that participated in the past but not in 2008

Vote
- Voting system: Each country awards 1–8, 10, and 12 points to their 10 favourite songs.
- Winning song: Georgia "Bzz.."

The Junior Eurovision Song Contest 2008 was the sixth edition of the Junior Eurovision Song Contest, held on 22 November 2008 at the "Spyros Kyprianou" Athletic Centre in Lemesos, Cyprus, and presented by Alex Michael and Sophia Paraskeva. It was organised by the European Broadcasting Union (EBU) and host broadcaster the Cyprus Broadcasting Corporation (CyBC). The theme of the event was "Fun in the Sun". Broadcasters from fifteen countries participated in the contest.

The winner was Georgia with the song "Bzz.." by trio Bzikebi. Ukraine took 2nd place and Lithuania finished 3rd. Bzikebi also became the first group act to win the Junior Eurovision Song Contest.

For the contest, various changes to the rules were made. One was that adults could assist children to write the songs submitted to their national broadcaster; previously only children could write the songs, with no assistance from adults. Another change was only six people could be on stage during a performance, instead of eight. The most significant change, however, was that only half of the vote was decided by the tele-voters. Before the 2008 contest tele-voters completely decided the whole result. The other half of the result was decided by a jury of adults and children.

== Location ==
Locations of the bidding countries. The withdrawn countries are marked in green. The eliminated countries are marked in red. The chosen host country is marked in blue.

=== Bidding phase and host selection ===
On 27 May 2007, the Eurovision Steering Group decided to award CyBC of Cyprus the rights to host the 2008 contest, over bids from TV4 of Sweden and NTU of Ukraine, the latter of which would later host the 2009 edition. RTP of Portugal had also submitted a bid, however it was withdrawn at an early stage, and the country went on to withdraw from the competition altogether.

=== Venue ===
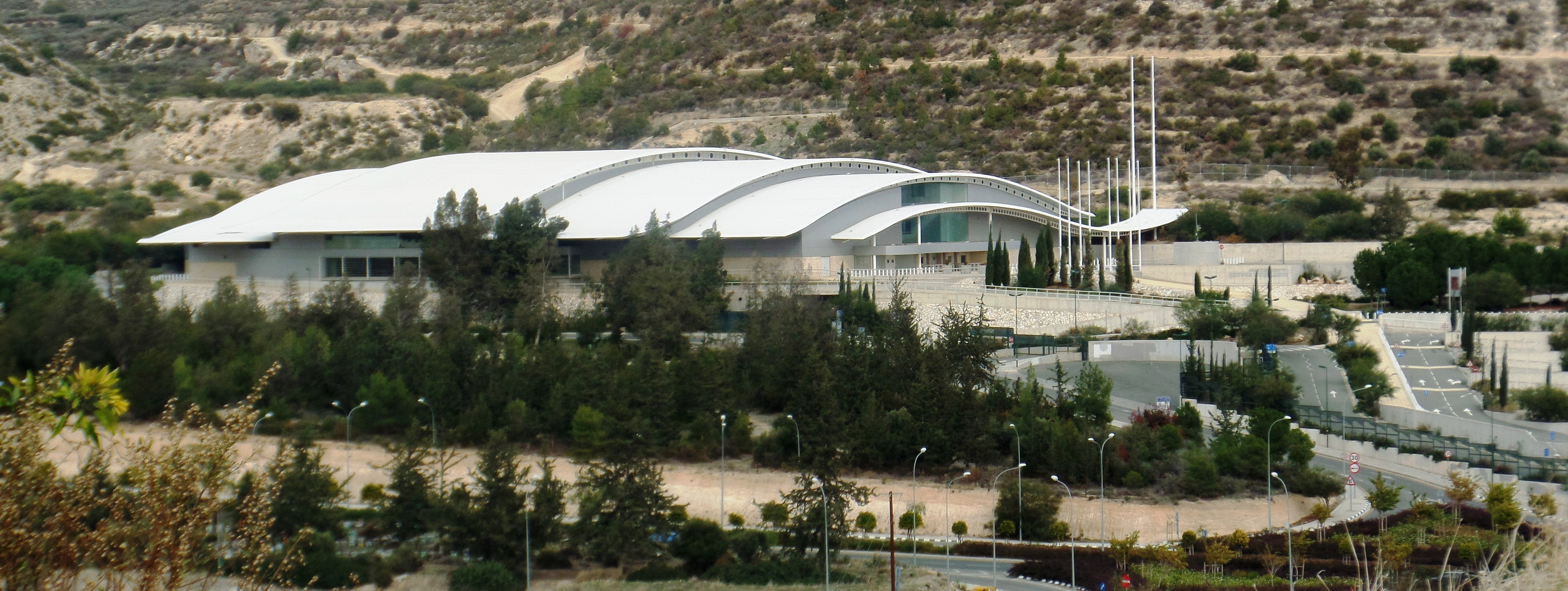
Spyros Kyprianou Athletic Center in Limassol was the host venue.

The Spyros Kyprianou Athletic Center (Greek: Αθλητικό Κέντρο "Σπύρος Κυπριανού"), also known as Palais des Sports, is the largest multi-purpose indoor athletics arena in Cyprus. It is named after the late president of Cyprus Spyros Kyprianou. The shuttle of the centre can host more than 6,255 spectators and at least 42 wheelchair spots. Moreover, the centre is used especially for the sport events of local schools in Limassol greater area.

== Participants ==
Cover art of the official album

Fifteen countries took part in the 2008 Junior Eurovision Song Contest: Armenia, Belarus, Belgium, Bulgaria, Cyprus, Macedonia, Georgia, Greece, Lithuania, Malta, Netherlands, Romania, Russia, Serbia, and Ukraine. Portugal, which had taken part twice since 2006 announced that it was no longer interested in the contest and withdrew along with Sweden, a founding country in 2003, which left due to other broadcasting plans around the time of the event. Sweden returned the following year, and Portugal would return in 2017 after winning the adult contest for the first time that same year.

On the other hand, Israel and Bosnia and Herzegovina announced their intention to participate, but decided both to withdraw before the contest. Welsh language broadcaster S4C considered the possibility of participation, but in the end it was decided they would not to participate in the competition, because their debut was rejected because Wales is not a sovereign state. Only the BBC has the exclusive right to represent the United Kingdom. Wales later debuted in the 2018 contest.

Azerbaijan announced its intention to take part also, but withdrew from the contest in early October. According to İctimai Televiziya və Radio Yayımları Şirkəti, the network was unable to select and prepare children for such a high scale event without proper help from other governmental structures and bodies. The broadcaster also confirmed payment of a fine to the EBU due to its late withdrawal. Poland had also considered participation but in the end, decided not to participate, and would only return in 2016. The 2008 contest was the first Junior Eurovision Song Contest to have no debuting countries.

Prior to the event, a compilation album featuring all the songs from the 2008 contest, along with karaoke versions, was put together by the European Broadcasting Union and released by Universal Music Group on 10 October 2008.

Participants of the Junior Eurovision Song Contest 2008
| Country | Broadcaster | Artist | Song | Language | Songwriter(s) |
|---|---|---|---|---|---|
| Armenia | AMPTV | Monica | "Im ergi hnchyune" (Իմ երգի հնչյունը) | Armenian | Monica Manucharova; Meri Mnjoyan |
| Belarus | BTRC | Dasha, Alina and Karina | "Serdtse Belarusi" (Сердце Беларуси) | Russian (Note: At the start of the song, the backing vocals are in Belarusian.) | Dasha Nadina |
| Belgium | VRT | Oliver | "Shut Up" | Dutch | Oliver Symons |
| Bulgaria | BNT | Krastyana Krasteva | "Edna mechta" (Една мечта) | Bulgarian | Krastyana Krasteva |
| Cyprus | CyBC | Elena Mannouri and Charis Savva | "Gioupi gia!" (Γιούπι για!) | Greek | Andreas Georgallis; Elena Mannouri; Charis Savva |
| Georgia | GPB | Bzikebi | "Bzz.." | None | Mariam Kikuashvili; Mariam Talulashvili; Giorgi Shiolashvili |
| Greece | ERT | Niki Yiannouchu | "Kapoia nychta" (Καποια νύχτα) | Greek | Niki Yiannouchu |
| Lithuania | LRT | Eglė Jurgaitytė | "Laiminga diena" | Lithuanian | Eglė Jurgaitytė |
| Macedonia | MRT | Bobi Andonov | "Prati mi SMS" (Прати ми СМС) | Macedonian | Bobi Andonov |
| Malta | PBS | Daniel Testa | "Junior Swing" | English | Daniel Testa |
| Netherlands | AVRO | Marissa | "1 dag" | Dutch | Marissa Grasdijk |
| Romania | TVR | Mădălina and Andrada | "Salvați planeta!" | Romanian | Mădălina Lefter; Andrada Popa |
| Russia | VGTRK | Mihail Puntov | "Spit angel" (Спит ангел) | Russian | Mikhail Puntov; Vsevolod Tarasov |
| Serbia | RTS | Maja Mazić | "Uvek kad u nebo pogledam" (Увек кaд у небо погледaм) | Serbian | Maja Mazić |
| Ukraine | NTU | Viktoria Petryk | "Matrosy" (Матроси) | Ukrainian | Viktoria Petryk |

== Format ==
=== Visual design ===
The stage, which was designed by George Papadopoulos, was nominated for the prestigious international "Live Design Excellence Awards". The design is an abstract composition and consists of a round stage representing the island of Cyprus, real water along the front of the stage, and five sailboats with oars. During the competition, a beach ball with the performer's national flag would be floating on the on-stage pond during their song.

The stage was constructed between 30 October 2008 and 14 November 2008.

=== Presenters ===
On 10 September 2008, the hosts were announced as Alex Michael and Sophia Paraskeva; both presenters with Cypriot backgrounds.

=== Running order ===
On 13 October 2008, the draw of the running order took place live on CyBC 1. This involved drawing the first and last countries and performers, and then drawing countries into various 'pots' to decide when they would perform. The full running order was announced on 14 October 2008.

=== Voting ===
As in all previous Eurovision Song Contests each country gave their top 10 countries songs points from 1 point for their 10th favourite song up until 8 points for their 3rd favourite song. Then 10 and 12 points were given for the second favourite and favourite respectively. However, the difference between this contest and other past contests is this is the first Eurovision Song Contest that implements a jury vote that counts for half of each countries vote. Profits made from the televoting were donated to UNICEF.

== Contest overview ==
The event took place on 22 November 2008 at 21:15 EET (20:15 CET). Fifteen countries participated, with the running order published on 14 October 2008. For the first time, all competing countries were eligible to vote through a 50% jury and 50% televoting system. (Note: Excluding Ukraine, which only used jury votes, as their broadcaster NTU aired the contest deferred on Sunday 23 November, as Saturday 22 November was Holodomor Memorial Day in the country.) Georgia won with 154 points, with Ukraine, Lithuania, Malta, and Macedonia completing the top five. Belgium, Serbia, the Netherlands, Greece, and Bulgaria occupied the bottom five positions.

The opening of the show featured a dance act featuring Yiorgos Ioannides and Mariam Venizelou. During the interval, Eurovision 2008 winner Dima Bilan performed two songs, alongside Evridiki and her husband Dimitris Korgialas who performed the theme song of the contest, "Fun in the Sun". Closing the interval, all participants performed the song "Hand in Hand", which was written especially for UNICEF and the Junior Eurovision Song Contest that year.

| R/O | Country | Artist | Song | Points | Place |
|---|---|---|---|---|---|
| 1 | Romania | Mădălina and Andrada | "Salvați planeta!" | 58 | 9 |
| 2 | Armenia | Monica | "Im ergi hnchyune" | 59 | 8 |
| 3 | Belarus | Dasha, Alina and Karina | "Serdtse Belarusi" | 86 | 6 |
| 4 | Russia | Mihail Puntov | "Spit angel" | 73 | 7 |
| 5 | Greece | Niki Yiannouchu | "Kapoia nychta" | 19 | 14 |
| 6 | Georgia | Bzikebi | "Bzz.." | 154 | 1 |
| 7 | Belgium | Oliver | "Shut Up" | 45 | 11 |
| 8 | Bulgaria | Krastyana Krasteva | "Edna mechta" | 15 | 15 |
| 9 | Serbia | Maja Mazić | "Uvek kad u nebo pogledam" | 37 | 12 |
| 10 | Malta | Daniel Testa | "Junior Swing" | 100 | 4 |
| 11 | Netherlands | Marissa | "1 dag" | 27 | 13 |
| 12 | Ukraine | Viktoria Petryk | "Matrosy" | 135 | 2 |
| 13 | Lithuania | Eglė Jurgaitytė | "Laiminga diena" | 103 | 3 |
| 14 | Macedonia | Bobi Andonov | "Prati mi SMS" | 93 | 5 |
| 15 | Cyprus | Elena Mannouri and Charis Savva | "Gioupi gia!" | 46 | 10 |

=== Spokespersons ===
1. Romania – Iulia Ciobanu
2. Armenia – Mary Sahakyan
3. Belarus – Anjelica Misevich
4. Russia – Sarina
5. Greece – Stefani Trepekli
6. Belgium – Chloé Ditlefsen
7. Bulgaria – Marina Baltadzi
8. Serbia – Anđelija Erić
9. Malta – Francesca Zarb
10. Netherlands – Famke Rauch
11. Ukraine – Marietta
12. Lithuania – Lina Joy
13. Cyprus – Christina Christofi
14. Georgia – Ana Davitaia
15. Macedonia – Marija Zafirovska

== Detailed voting results ==
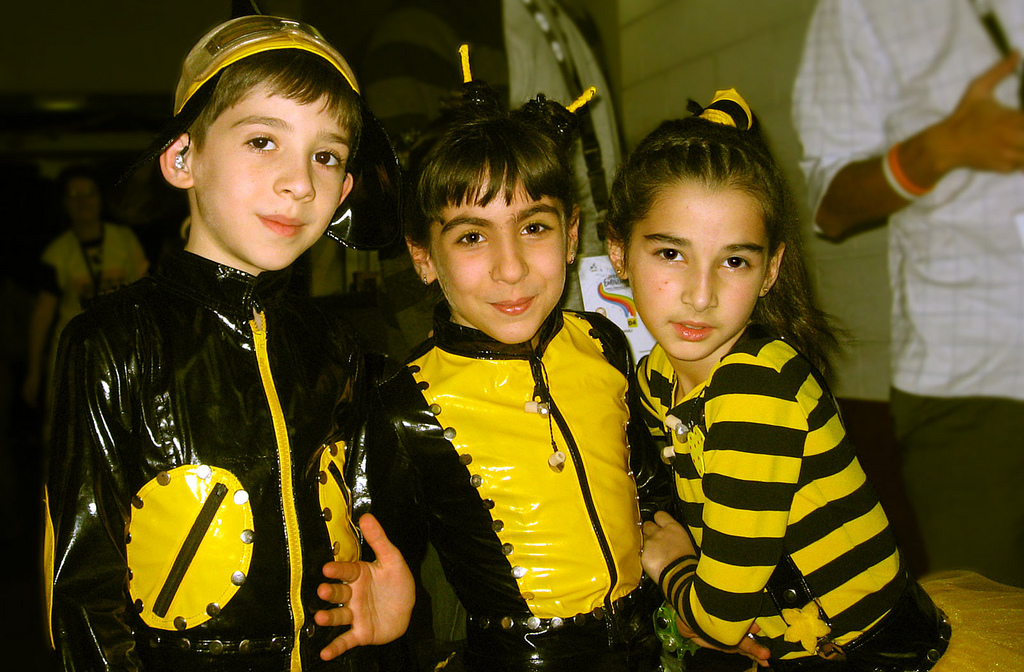
Bzikebi, Georgia's participants

Georgia and Macedonia awarded their points last due to technical problems.

Detailed voting results
| Voting procedure used: 50% jury and televote 100% jury vote | | Total score | Romania | Armenia | Belarus | Russia | Greece | Belgium | Bulgaria | Serbia | Malta | Netherlands | Ukraine | Lithuania | Cyprus | Georgia | Macedonia |
| Contestants | Romania | 58 | | 4 | 2 | 2 | 2 | 2 | 1 | 5 | 3 | 2 | 4 | 1 | 8 | 2 | 8 |
| Contestants | Armenia | 59 | 3 | | 5 | 6 | 6 | 6 | 7 | | | 3 | 3 | | | 8 | |
| Contestants | Belarus | 86 | 5 | 5 | | 10 | 4 | 10 | 6 | 7 | 7 | 4 | 5 | 3 | 3 | | 5 |
| Contestants | Russia | 73 | | 10 | 12 | | 3 | | 2 | 2 | 6 | 1 | 7 | 8 | 4 | 5 | 1 |
| Contestants | Greece | 19 | | | | | | | | | | | | | 7 | | |
| Contestants | Georgia | 154 | 6 | 12 | 8 | 12 | 10 | 12 | 12 | 10 | 8 | 12 | 12 | 12 | 12 | | 4 |
| Contestants | Belgium | 45 | 2 | 2 | 1 | 1 | | | | 3 | 2 | 10 | 2 | 4 | | 4 | 2 |
| Contestants | Bulgaria | 15 | | | | | | | | | | | | | | | 3 |
| Contestants | Serbia | 37 | 1 | 1 | | 3 | | 1 | | | | | 1 | | | 6 | 12 |
| Contestants | Malta | 100 | 7 | 7 | 4 | 5 | 7 | 7 | 8 | 1 | | 6 | 10 | 7 | 6 | 7 | 6 |
| Contestants | Netherlands | 27 | | | 3 | | | 5 | | | 1 | | | 5 | 1 | | |
| Contestants | Ukraine | 135 | 12 | 8 | 10 | 8 | 8 | 3 | 10 | 6 | 12 | 7 | | 10 | 10 | 12 | 7 |
| Contestants | Lithuania | 103 | 8 | | 6 | 7 | 1 | 8 | 3 | 12 | 10 | 8 | 6 | | 2 | 10 | 10 |
| Contestants | Macedonia | 93 | 10 | 6 | 7 | 4 | 5 | 4 | 5 | 8 | 5 | 5 | 8 | 6 | 5 | 3 | |
| Contestants | Cyprus | 46 | 4 | 3 | | | 12 | | 4 | 4 | 4 | | | 2 | | 1 | |

=== 12 points ===
Below is a summary of all 12 points received. All countries were given 12 points at the start of voting to ensure that no country finished with nul points.

| N. | Contestant | Nation(s) giving 12 points |
|---|---|---|
| 8 | Georgia | Armenia, Belgium, Bulgaria, Cyprus, Lithuania, Netherlands, Russia, Ukraine |
| 3 | Ukraine | Georgia, Malta, Romania |
| 1 | Lithuania | Serbia |
| 1 | Russia | Belarus |
| 1 | Cyprus | Greece |
| 1 | Serbia | Macedonia |

== Other countries ==
For a country to be eligible for potential participation in the Junior Eurovision Song Contest, it needs to be an active member of the EBU.

- Azerbaijan – Azerbaijan was originally going to participate but withdrew on 15 October 2008, due to the lack of participants signed up for the national final.
- Bosnia and Herzegovina – Bosnia and Herzegovina were also set to participate but later withdrew. Bosnia and Herzegovina also unsuccessfully attempted to participate in 2007. They did, however, broadcast the contest live.
- Poland – Poland broadcast the Miniszansa on TVP2. It was intended to serve as a pre-selection for the Junior Eurovision Song Contest, but then withdrew from the competition. They would only return in 2016.

== Broadcasts ==
A live broadcast of the Junior Eurovision Song Contest was available worldwide via satellite through European streams such as TVRi, ERT World, ARMTV, RTS Sat, RTR Planeta and MKTV Sat. The official Eurovision Song Contest website also provided a live stream without commentary via the peer-to-peer medium Octoshape.

Broadcasters and commentators in participating countries
| Country | Broadcaster(s) | Channel(s) | Commentator(s) | Ref. |
|---|---|---|---|---|
| Armenia | AMPTV | Armenia 1 | Gohar Gasparyan | |
| Belarus | BTRC | Belarus 1 | Denis Kurian | |
| Belgium | VRT | Eén | Kristien Maes and Ben Roelants | |
| Bulgaria | BNT | BNT 1 | Elena Rosberg and Georgi Kushvaliev | |
| Cyprus | CyBC | RIK 1, RIK Sat | Kyriakos Pastides | |
| Georgia | GPB | 1TV | Temo Kvirkvelia | |
| Greece | ERT | ET1, ERT World | Renia Tsitsibikou and George Amyras | |
| Lithuania | LRT | LRT TV | Darius Užkuraitis | |
| Macedonia | MKRTV | MTV 1, MKTV Sat | Ivona Bogoevska | |
| Malta | PBS | TVM | Valerie Vella | |
| Netherlands | AVRO | Nederlands 1 | Sipke Jan Bousema | |
| Poland | TVP | TVP2 | Artur Orzech | |
| Romania | TVR | TVR1, TVRi | Ioana Isopescu and Alexandru Nagy | |
| Russia | VGRTK | Carousel | Olga Shelest | |
| Serbia | RTS | RTS2, RTS Sat | Duška Vučinić-Lučić | |
| Ukraine | NTU | Pershyi | Timur Miroshnychenko | |

Broadcasters and commentators in non-participating countries
| Country | Broadcaster(s) | Channel(s) | Commentator(s) | Ref. |
|---|---|---|---|---|
| Australia | SBS | SBS One (Note: Delayed broadcast on 13 May 2009 at 13:00) | Unknown | |
| Azerbaijan | İctimai TV | | Unknown | |
| Bosnia and Herzegovina | BHRT | BHT 1 | Dejan Kukrić | |

== See also ==
- Eurovision Song Contest 2008
- Eurovision Dance Contest 2008
- Eurovision Young Musicians 2008
