= Ukraine in the Junior Eurovision Song Contest =

- Junior Eurovision Song Contest
- Participating broadcaster: Public Broadcasting Company of Ukraine (UA:PBC)

Participation summary
- Appearances: 21
- First appearance: 2006
- Highest placement: 1st: 2012
- Host: 2009, 2013
- Participation history: 2006; 2007; 2008; 2009; 2010; 2011; 2012; 2013; 2014; 2015; 2016; 2017; 2018; 2019; 2020; 2021; 2022; 2023; 2024; 2025; 2026

External links
- UA:PBC page
- For the most recent participation see Ukraine in the Junior Eurovision Song Contest 2026

Ukraine has been represented at the Junior Eurovision Song Contest since 2006. The Ukrainian participating broadcaster in the contest is the Public Broadcasting Company of Ukraine (UA:PBC).

== History ==
Ukraine was set to debut in the 2005 contest, being represented by the Public Broadcasting Company of Ukraine, however the broadcaster pulled out of the contest before the official list of participants. UA:PBC still broadcast the contest in 2005. UA:PBC instead decided to debut the following year in 2006.The broadcaster decided to hold a National Final; Nazar Slyusarchuk was selected with his entry "Khlopchyk Rock 'n' Roll," the nation placed 9th. In 2007, another National Final was held with Ilona Halytska winning the selection with her entry "Urok hlamuru" the country would place 9th again.

In the 2008 contest, Viktoria Petryk achieved 135 points and reached 2nd place in a field of 15 other places with her song "Matrosy." This result gave the country its best result–at the time, and the first top 3 placement for Ukraine. Subsequently, UA:PBC hosted the 2009 contest, in the Palace of Sports in Kyiv. Ukraine held another National Finak and was represented by Andranik Alexanyan with "Try topoli, try surmy" – he placed 5th.

=== 2010-2019 ===
In 2012, the entry "Nebo" performed by Anastasiya Petryk, – who is also Viktoria Petryk's sister, gave Ukraine its first every win, and as of 2026, the countrys only win the contest. The 35–point winning margin also become a record at the time. Subsequently, UA:PBC once again hosted the competition in 2013, this time at Palace "Ukraine" in Kyiv. Making Kyiv the first city to host the contest twice. The country also placed 2nd, giving it its 3rd top 3 placement.

UA:PBC continued its participation from the 2014 contest to the 2017 contest, but on 2 July 2018, UA:PBC initially announced that they would not take part in the 2018 contest in Minsk, Belarus due to financial difficulties. However, on 2 August 2018, the European Broadcasting Union (EBU) announced that UA:PBC would participate in 2018. In 2019, the nation received its worst result to date when it placed 15th out of 19 countries in Gliwice, Poland.

=== 2020-present ===
Ukraine participated one again in the contest from 2020 to 2023. Meanwhile, in 2024 UA:PBC presented a new selection format by the name of "Natsvidbir na Dytiache Yevrobachennia" which would, at first, select the top 6 artists from a longlist. The selected 6 artists would then compete in a final, where the result of the final would be selected from a jury vote and an online vote. The jury would award a set of 1-6 points to every song and the online vote would do the same; Incase of a tie the song with a higher televote would go to Junior Eurovison. In 2024, "Hear Me Now", originally titled "Dim" by Artem Kotenko won Natsvidbir na Dytiache Yevrobachennia – 2024 and placed 3rd in Madrid, Spain, which gave Ukraine its 4th top 3 placement. In 2025, "Motanka" by Sofiia Neresian won Natsvidbir na Dytiache Yevrobachennia – 2025 which would go on to win the televote, and place 2nd overall in Tbilisi, Georgia, giving ukraine its 5th top 3 placement. UA:PBC confirmed its participation in the 2026 contest and will use Natsvidbir na Dytiache Yevrobachennia once again to select its entry.

== Participation overview ==
Table key
1	First place
2	Second place
3	Third place
◁	Last place

Year	Artist	Song	Language	Place	Points
2006	Nazar Slyusarchuk	"Khlopchyk Rock 'n' Roll" (Хлопчик рок 'н' ролл)	Ukrainian	9	58
2007	Ilona Halytska	"Urok hlamuru" (Урок гламуру)	Ukrainian	9	56
2008	Viktoria Petryk	"Matrosy" (Матроси)	Ukrainian	2	135
2009	Andranik Alexanyan	"Try topoli, try surmy" (Три тополі, три сурми)	Ukrainian	5	89
2010	Yuliya Gurska	"Mii litak" (Мій літак)	Ukrainian	14 ◁	28
2011	Kristall	"Yevropa" (Європа)	Ukrainian, English	11	42
2012	Anastasiya Petryk	"Nebo" (Небо)	Ukrainian, English	1	138
2013	Sofia Tarasova	"We Are One"	Ukrainian, English	2	121
2014	Sympho-Nick	"Spring Will Come"	Ukrainian, English	6	74
2015	Anna Trincher	"Pochny z sebe" (Почни з себе)	Ukrainian, English	11	38
2016	Sofia Rol	"Planet Craves for Love"	Ukrainian, English	14	30
2017	Anastasiya Baginska	"Don't Stop"	Ukrainian, English	7	147
2018	Darina Krasnovetska	"Say Love"	Ukrainian, English	4	182
2019	Sophia Ivanko	"The Spirit of Music"	Ukrainian, English	15	59
2020	Oleksandr Balabanov	"Vidkryvai (Open Up)" (Відкривай)	Ukrainian, English	7	106
2021	Olena Usenko	"Vazhil" (Важіль)	Ukrainian	6	125
2022	Zlata Dziunka	"Nezlamna (Unbreakable)" (Незламна)	Ukrainian, English	9	111
2023	Anastasiia Dymyd	"Kvitka" (Квітка)	Ukrainian, English	5	128
2024	Artem Kotenko	"Hear Me Now"	Ukrainian, English	3	203
2025	Sofiia Nersesian	"Motanka" (Мотанка)	Ukrainian, English	2	177
2026	Erika Kolesnichenko	"Not a Lullaby"	Ukrainian, English	9	106

== Photo gallery ==
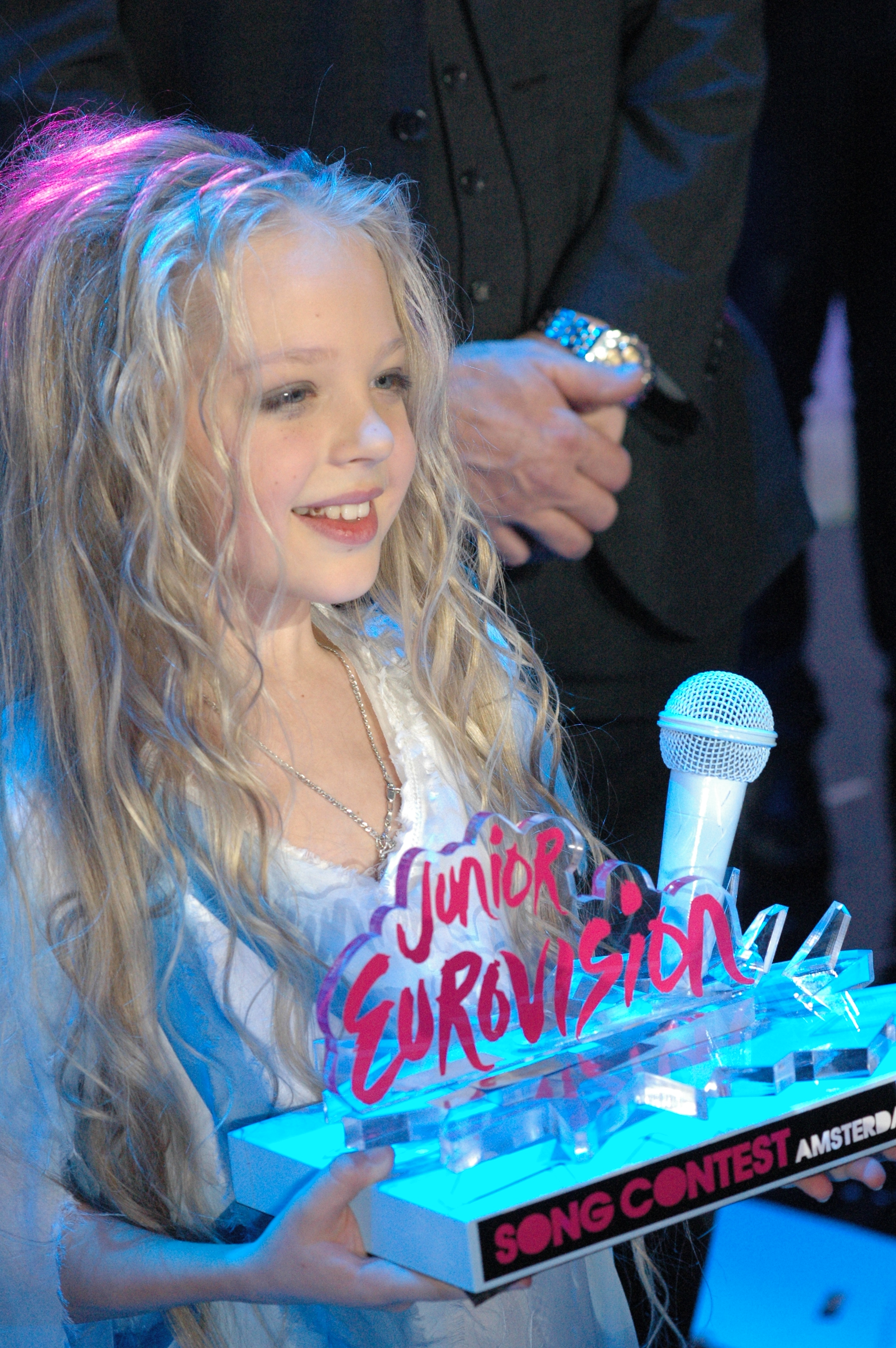
Anastasiya Petryk in Amsterdam (2012)

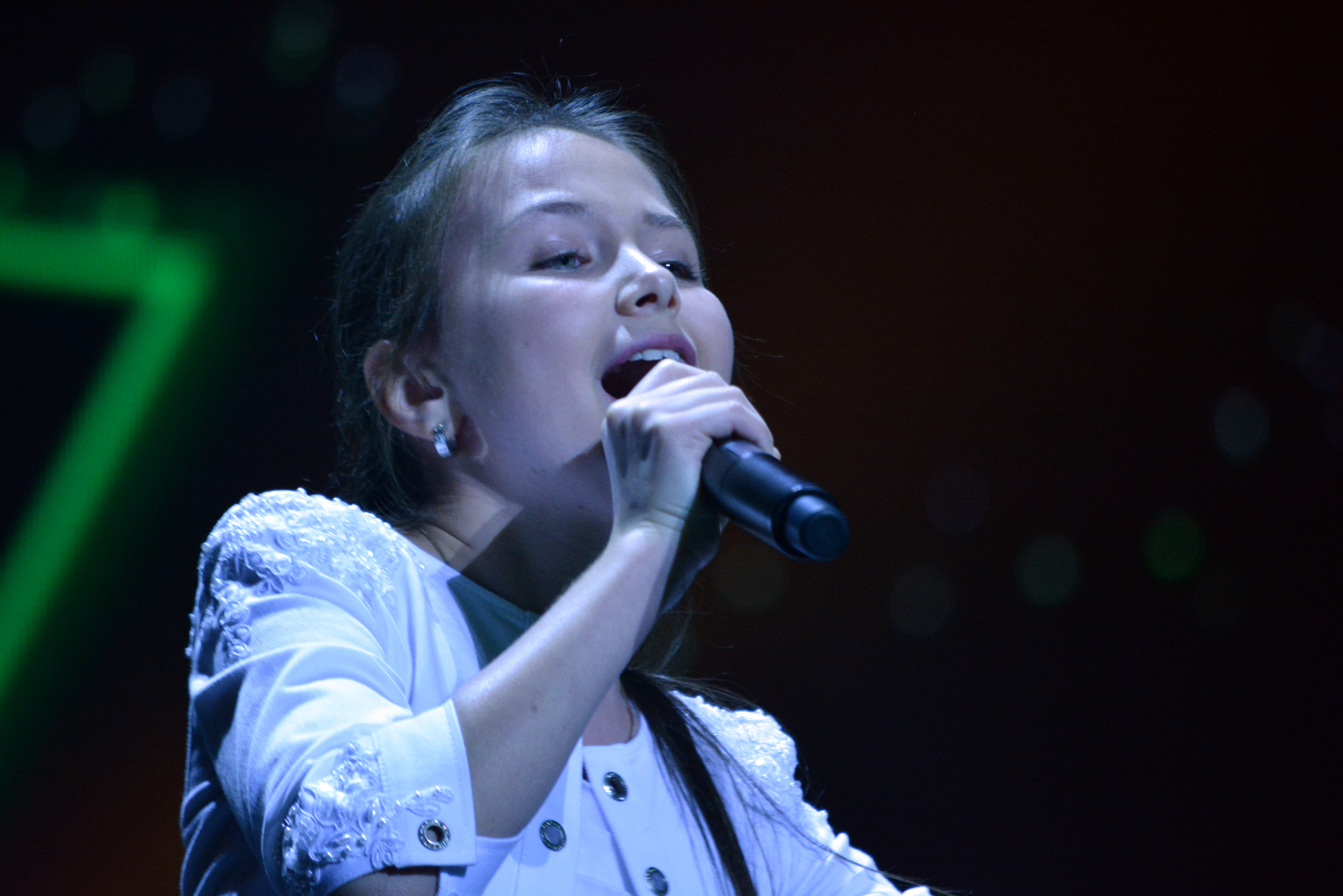
Sofia Tarasova in Kyiv (2013)

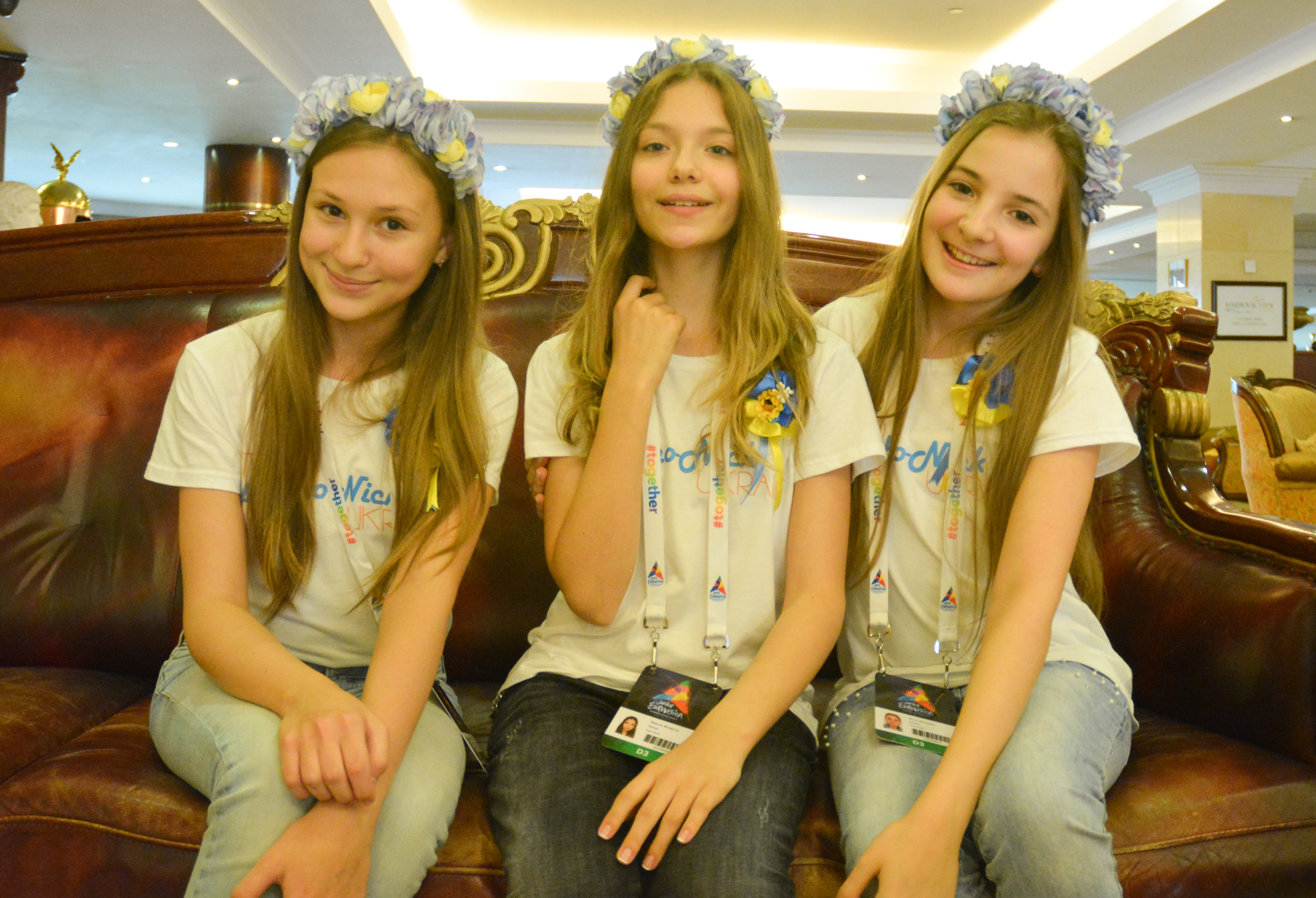
Interview with Sympho-Nick for kidsmusic.info at the 2014 contest

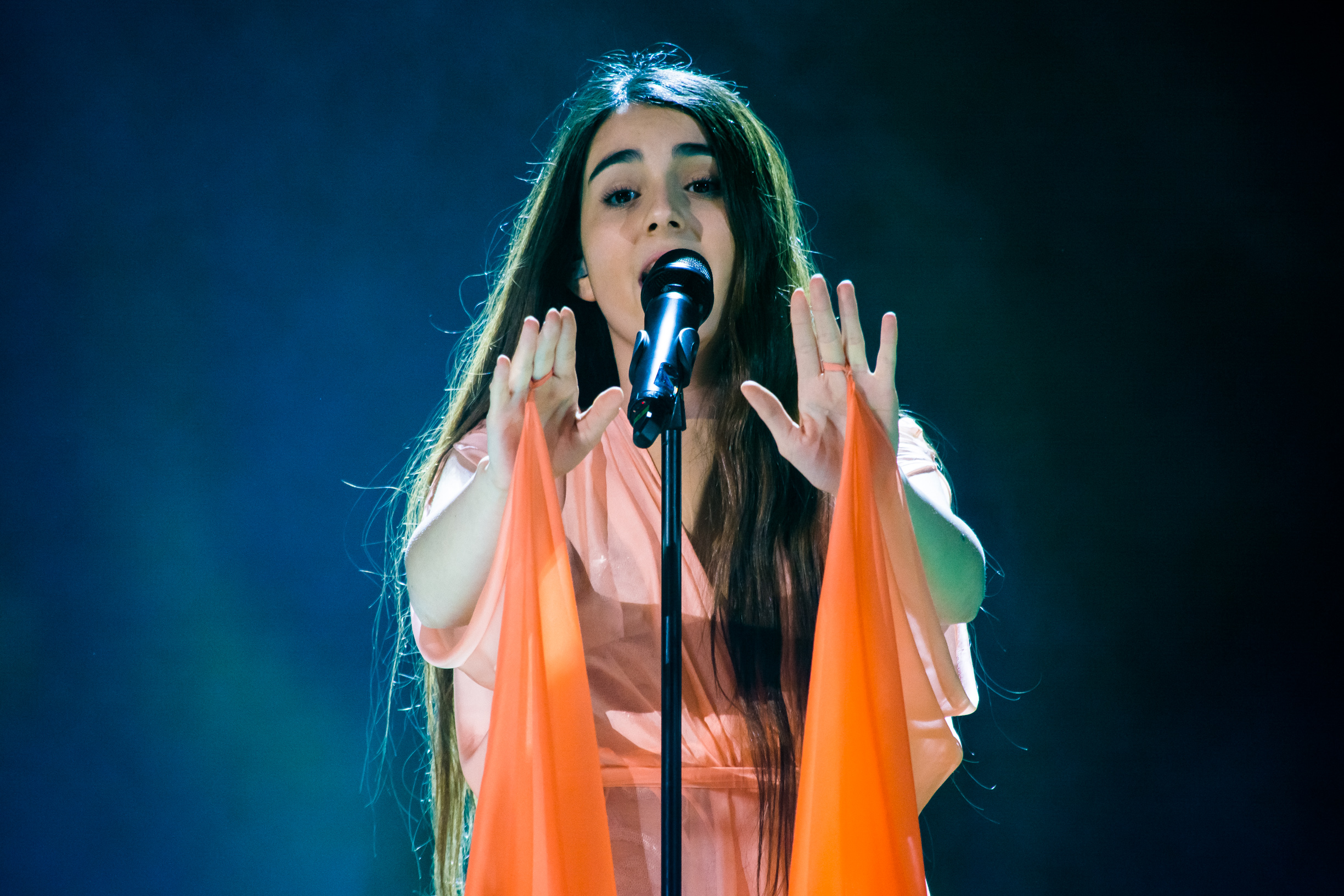
Anna Trincher in Sofia (2015)

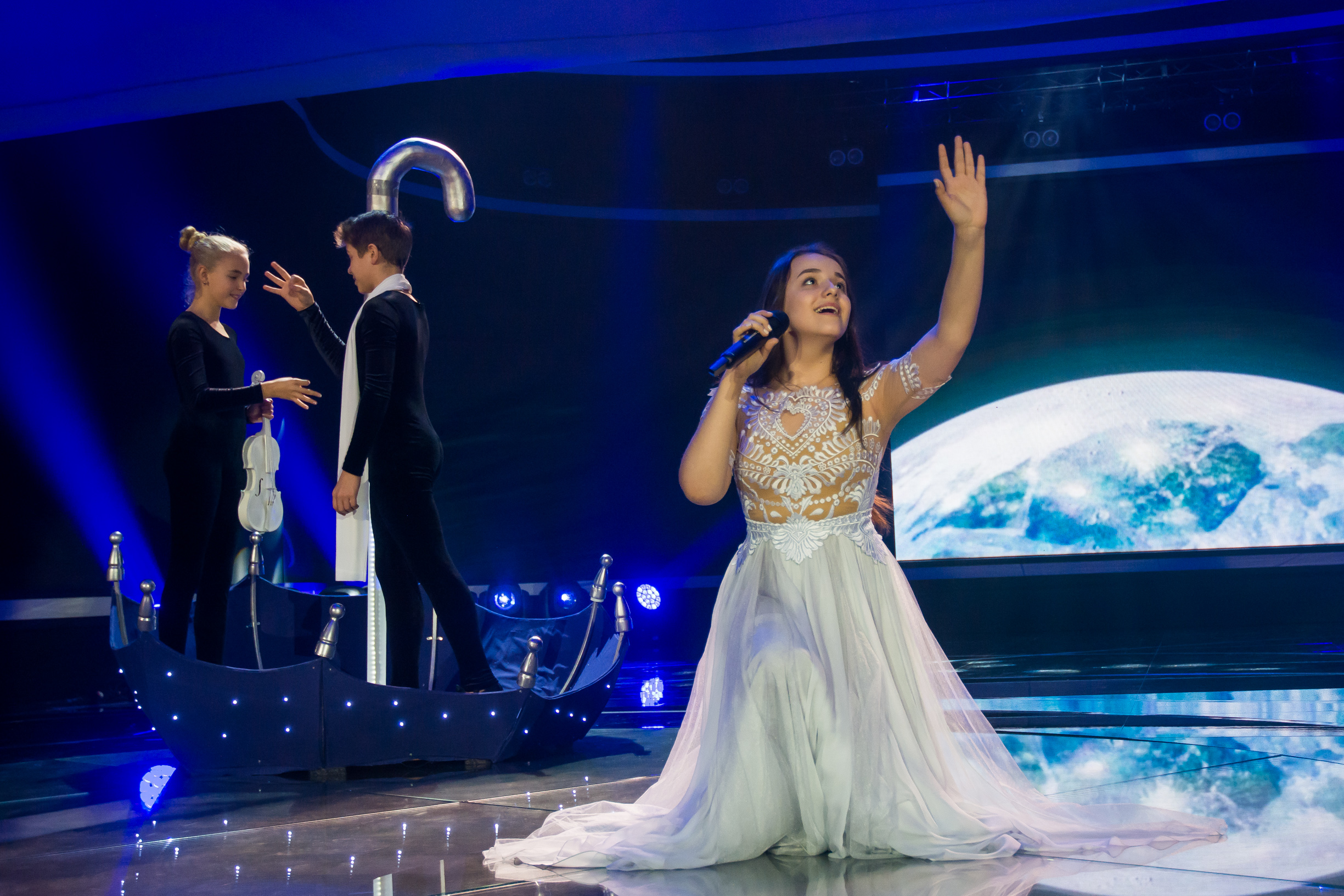
Sofia Rol in Valletta (2016)

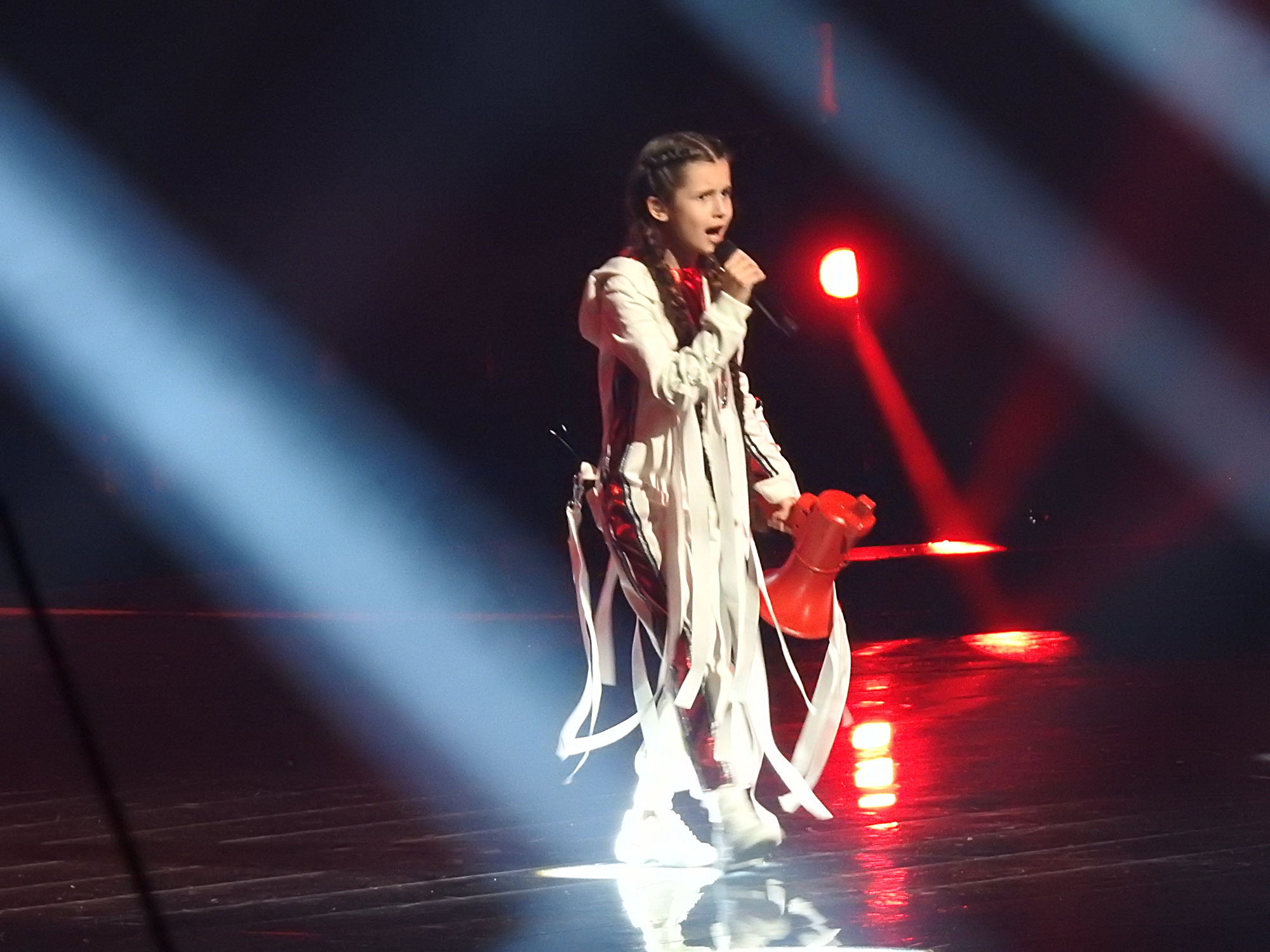
Darina Krasnovetska in Minsk (2018)

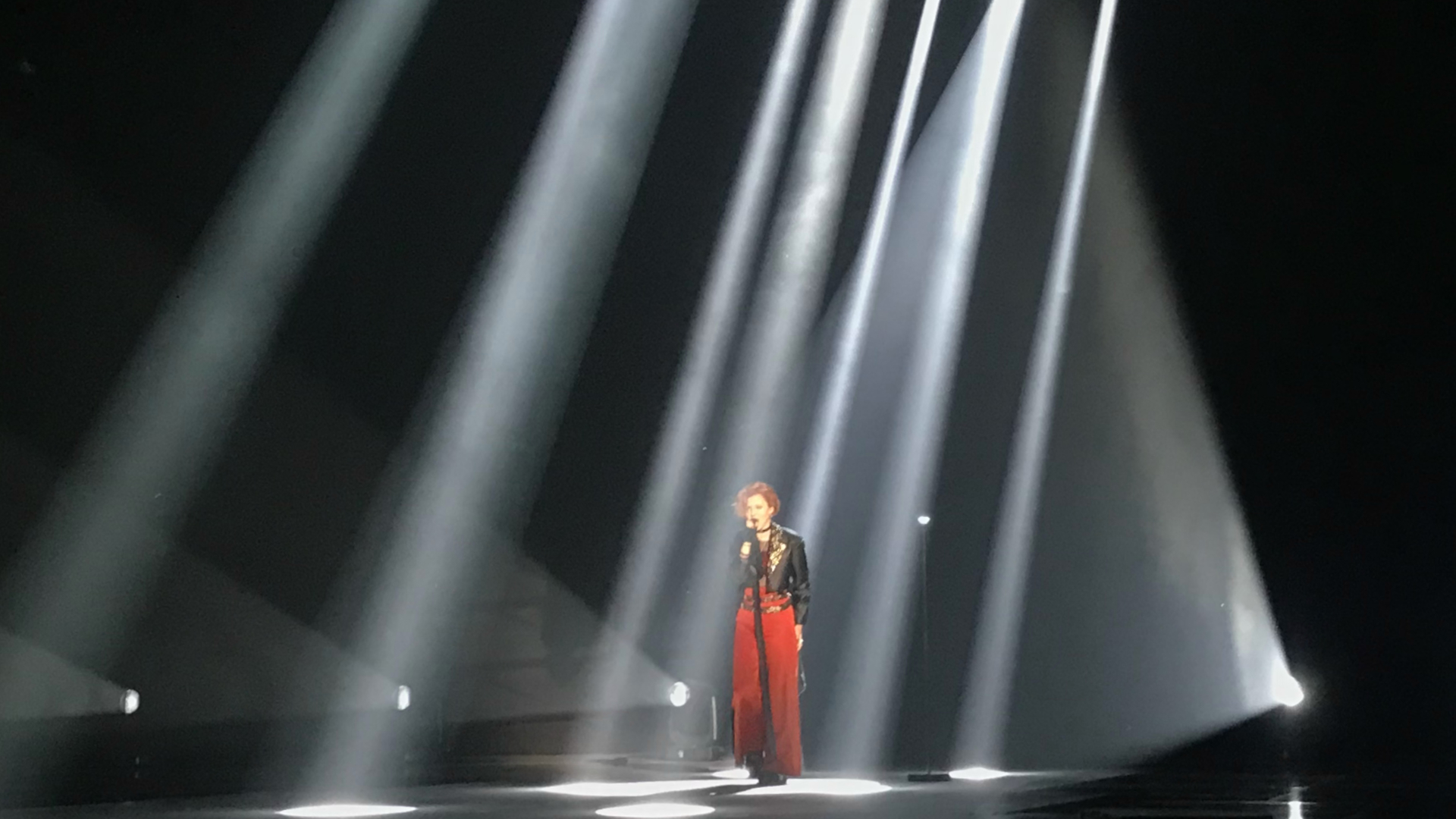
Olena Usenko in Paris (2021)

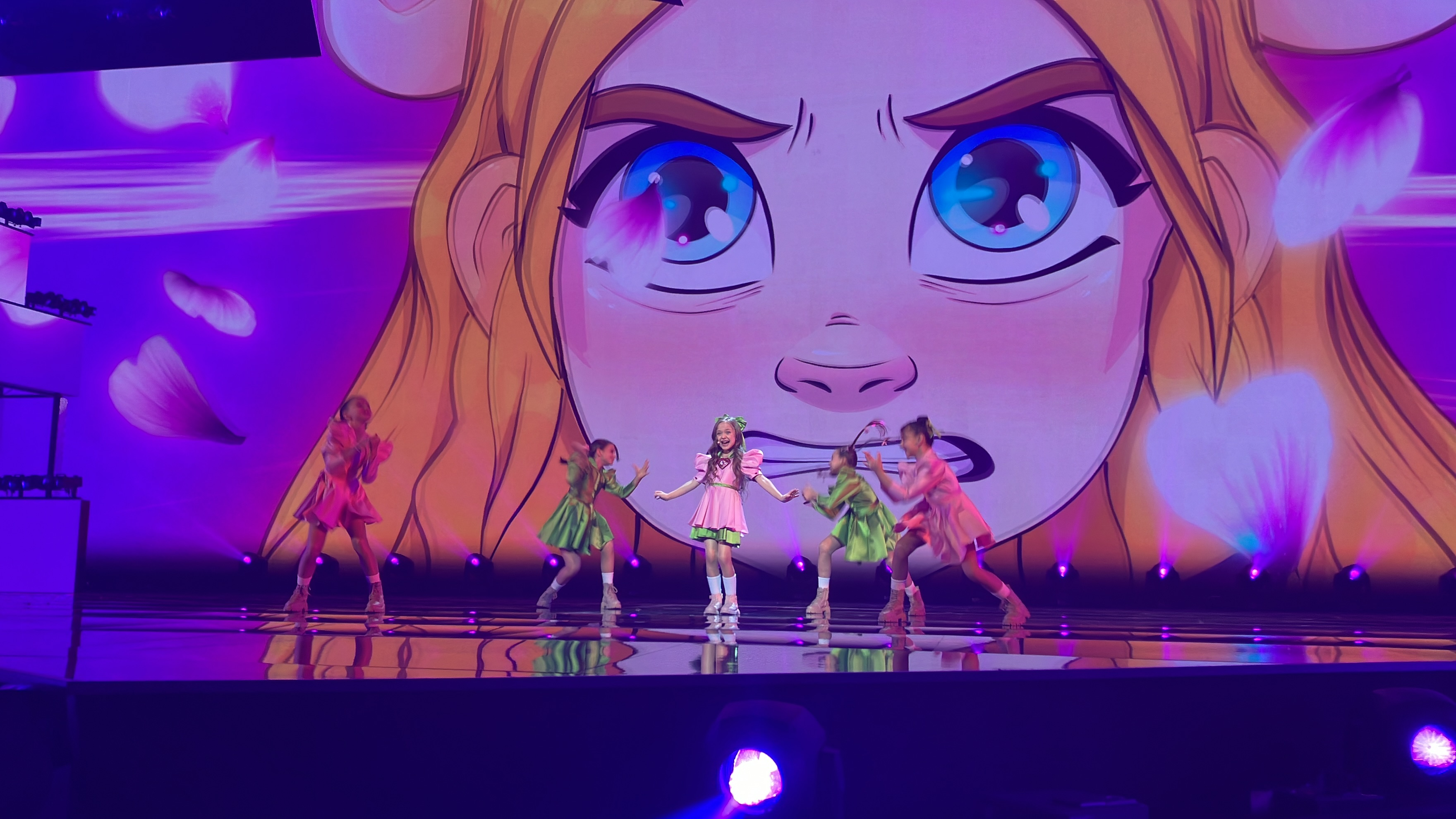
Anastasiia Dymyd in Nice (2023)

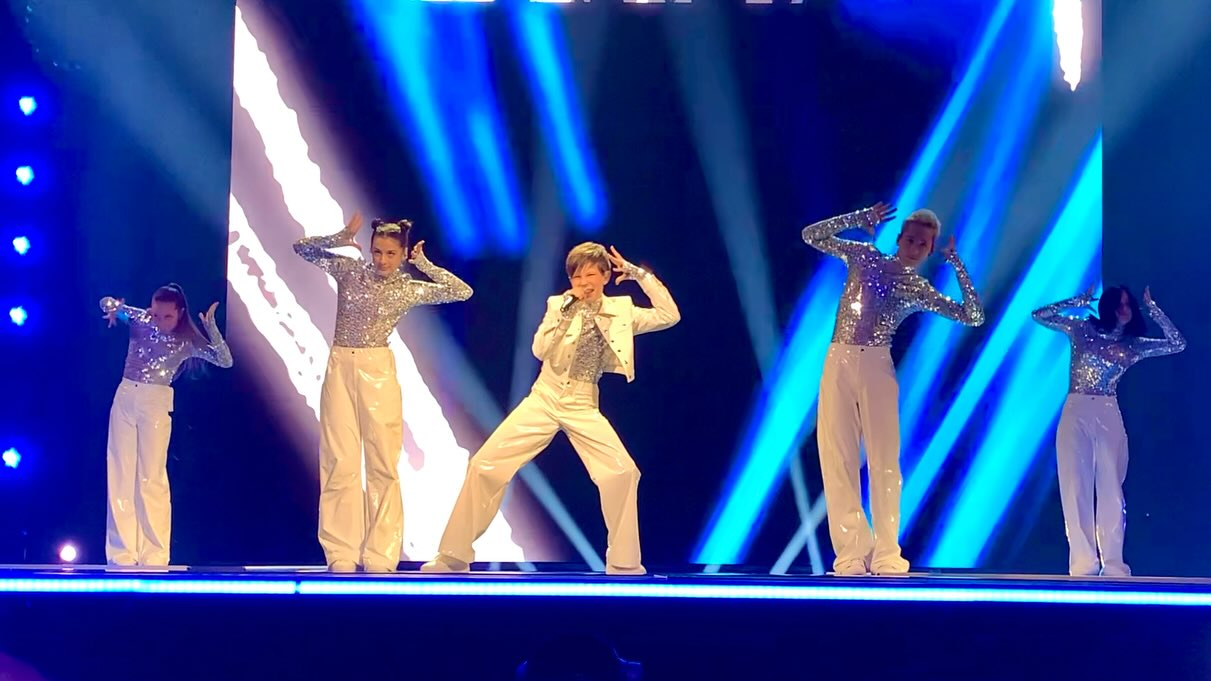
Artem Kotenko in Madrid (2024)

== Commentators and spokespersons ==
The contests are broadcast online worldwide through the official Junior Eurovision Song Contest website junioreurovision.tv and YouTube. In 2015, the online broadcasts featured commentary in English by junioreurovision.tv editor Luke Fisher and 2011 Bulgarian Junior Eurovision Song Contest entrant Ivan Ivanov. The Ukrainian broadcaster sent their own commentators to the contest in order to provide commentary in the Ukrainian language. Spokespersons were also chosen by the national broadcaster in order to announce the awarding points from Ukraine. The table below list the details of each commentator and spokesperson since 2005.

Year	Commentator	Spokesperson	Ref.
2005	Timur Miroshnychenko	Did not participate	
2006	Timur Miroshnychenko	Assol	
2007	Timur Miroshnychenko	Assol	
2008	Timur Miroshnychenko	Marietta	
2009	Mariya Orlova	Marietta	
2010	Timur Miroshnychenko	Elizabeth Arfush	
2011	Timur Miroshnychenko	Amanda Koenig	
2012	Timur Miroshnychenko	Kristall	
2013	Tetiana Terekhova	Elizabeth Arfush	
2014	Timur Miroshnychenko	Sofia Tarasova	
2015	Timur Miroshnychenko	Sofia Kutsenko	
2016	Timur Miroshnychenko	Anna Trincher	
2017	Timur Miroshnychenko	Sofia Rol	
2018	Timur Miroshnychenko	Anastasiya Baginska	
2019	Timur Miroshnychenko	Darina Krasnovetska	
2020	Timur Miroshnychenko	Sophia Ivanko	
2021	Viktor Diachenko	Oleksandr Balabanov	
2022	Timur Miroshnychenko	Mykola Oliinyk	
2023	Timur Miroshnychenko	Zlata Dziunka	
2024	Timur Miroshnychenko	Anastasia Dymyd	
2025	Timur Miroshnychenko	Artem Kotenko	
2026	Timur Miroshnychenko	Sofiia Nersesian	

== Hostings ==
Year	Location	Venue	Presenters
2009	Kyiv	Palace of Sports	Ani Lorak and Timur Miroshnychenko
2013	Kyiv	Palace "Ukraine"	Zlata Ognevich and Timur Miroshnychenko

== See also ==
- Ukraine in the Eurovision Song Contest – Senior version of the Junior Eurovision Song Contest.
- Russia–Ukraine relations in the Eurovision Song Contest – Relations between the two countries in the Junior and Senior Eurovision Song Contests.
