= Ukraine in the Junior Eurovision Song Contest 2012 =

- Junior Eurovision Song Contest 2012
- Participating broadcaster: National Television Company of Ukraine (NTU)
- Country: Ukraine
- Selection process: Dytiache Yevrobachennia - Natsionalnyi vidbir
- Selection date: 8 July 2012

Competing entry
- Song: "Nebo"
- Artist: Anastasiya Petryk
- Songwriter: Anastasiya Petryk

Placement
- Final result: 1st, 138 points

Participation chronology

Ukraine was represented at the Junior Eurovision Song Contest 2012 with the song "Nebo", written and performed by Anastasiya Petryk. The Ukrainian participating broadcaster, the National Television Company of Ukraine (NTU), selected its entry for the contest through a national final. The song won the contest.

== Before Junior Eurovision ==
=== Dytiache Yevrobachennia - Natsionalnyi vidbir ===
The National Television Company of Ukraine (NTU) opened the submission window for the national selection from 13 April until 31 May 2012. From the submissions, 58 entries were shortlisted to compete in the internal semi-final.

==== Internal semi-final ====
The internal semi-final took place on 6 June 2012. From the 58 competing entries, a jury selected 21 entries for the final. Another 2 artists were awarded special prizes and got to be present at the final. The jury consisted of Maryna Pidgirna, Shanis, Tetiana Piskarova and Vlad Baginskiy. 2 artists didn’t perform in the semi-final and multiple entries broke the rules of the contest.

Selected for the final Special award given and present at the final ◇ Didn’t perform in the semi-final

Internal semi-final – 6 June 2012
R/O	Artist	Song
1	Yulichka-Ukrayinochka	"Ukrainska v mene dusha" ("Українська в мене душа")
2	Averyanovy Sisters	"Ne zalyshay nadiy" ("Не залишай надій")
3	Sofia Tarasova	"Pazly" ("Пазли") (Note: Song title changed to "Zhyttievyi pazl" ("Життєвий пазл") in the final)
4	Katerina Dolenko	"Viriu ya" ("Вірю я")
5	Olya Kovalska	"Svitlyi angel" ("Світлий ангел")
6	Alyona Porohnya	"Tanok schastya" ("Танок щастя")
7	Radiosimia	"Radiosimia" ("Радіосім'я")
8	Anna-Mariya Mironova	"Veseli muzyky" ("Веселі музики")
9	Sofiya Kutsenko and Valeriya Tyahun	"Na Ivana, na Kupala" ("На Івана, на Купала")
10	Ivan Masnyuk	"Techiia" ("Течія")
11	Alisa Rzhavska	"Futbol" ("Футбол")
12	Alina Ovcharenko	"Posmikhnysia sviti" ("Посміхнися світі")
13	Ameli	"Ne zabuvay" ("Не забувай")
14	Kostya Flash	"Moia ridna kraina" ("Моя рідна країна")
15	Tetyana Marchuk (Note: Stage name changed to Tania Marchuk in the final)	"Davayte vsi razom" ("Давайтє всі разом") (Note: Song title changed to "Vsi razom" ("Всі разом") in the final)
16	Dasha	"Yaskraviy styl" ("Яскравий стиль")
17	ExSportize	"Vechirka" ("Вечірка")
18	Alina Chikurova	"Ukraina" ("Україна")
19	Kalin Roksolana	"Za mriieiu" ("За мрією")
20	Force-majeur	"Eurovision"
21	Tetyana Gulyk	"Oy, zahray, skrypaliu molodesenkyi" ("Ой, заграй, скрипалю молодесенький") (Note: Song title changed to "Oy, zagray skrypalyu" ("Ой, заграй скрипалю") in the final)
22	Anastasiya Petryk	"Nebo" ("Небо")
23	Vlada Hill	"Ya bachu slid" ("Я бачу слід")
24	Katya Rybak	"Miy svit" ("Мій світ")
25	Anna Kartashova	"Miy litak" ("Мій літак")
26	Kapriz-Juniors	"Kosmo-dity" ("Космо-діти")
27	Polina Andreyeva	"Mrii u tvoikh rukakh" ("Мрії у твоїх руках")
28	Anna Krutova	"Ti znaydesh" ("Ті не знайдеш")
29	Viktoriia Kobzar	"Vid sertsia do sertsia" ("Від серця до серця")
30	Marisha	"Lechu do doma" ("Лечу до дома")
31	Anastasiia Baranovska	"Mama" ("Мама")
32	Akva-Brand	"Pershe kokhannia" ("Перше кохання")
33	Mykyta Kiosse	"Ikar" ("Ікар")
34	Irina Ebralidze	"Namalyuy" ("Намалюй")
35	Olha Dulumbadzhi	"Stereo dumok" ("Стерео думок")
36	Olena Gernega	"Schastya poruch" ("Щастя поруч")
37	Anna Priymak	"Posmikhnis" ("Посміхніс")
38	Anna Yavorskaia	"Khvilia ditinstva" ("Хвиля дитинства")
39	Dariia Taran	"Assol" ("Ассоль")
40	Mamyni donki	"Ivasyk Telesyk ta divchata" ("Івасик Телесик та дивчата")
41	Tetyana Shevchuk (Note: Stage name changed to Tanya Shevchuk in the final)	"Rozhevi okuliary" ("Рожеві окуляри")
42	Alisa Igina	"Miy jazz" ("Мій джаз")
43	Anna Hanchuk	"Jasmin" ("Жасмін")
45	Tetyana Myza	"Miy drug" ("Мій друг")
46	Nina Boykova	"Ostrovi" ("Острові")
47	Vasylysa Boykova	"Zapaly" ("Запали")
48	Anastasiia Kalinova	"Kalynova dusha" ("Калинова душа")
49	Irina Stepanova	"Ya spivaiu" ("Я співаю")
50	Inna Prychepiy	"Tobi" ("Тобі")
51	Solomiia Katerynchuk	"Mavka" ("Мавка")
52	Maksim Savchuk	"Twist"
53	Hrystyna Bobrovnyk	"Mene ne menyay" ("Мене не міняй")
54	Elena Gregori	"Khto z nikh?" ("Хто з них?") (Note: Song title changed to "Z nykh kozhen" ("З них кожен") in the final)
55	Irina Tsukanova	"Moia zemlia" ("Моя земля")
56	Olha Logozar	"Ne tak" ("Не так")
—	Inesa Gritsayenko ◇	"Znaiu" ("Знаю") ◇
—	Mariia Makeyeva ◇	"Kazkova polyana" ("Казкова поляна") ◇

==== Final ====
The full running order for the final was revealed on 5 July 2012.

The final took place on 8 July 2012 in Artek at 20:20 CET and broadcast on Pershyi. The show was hosted by Timur Miroshnychenko, Liza Arfush, Tetyana Terekhova and Rostislav Torodescu. The results were decided by a jury and televoting. The jury consisted of Elena Poddubnaya, Matias, Tetiana Piskarova, Vlad Baginskiy and Walid Harfouch. Guest performers at the show were Emotion, Kristall, Matias, Renata Shtifel, Shporty and Viktoria Petryk.

Final - 8 July 2012
R/O	Artist	Song	Points	Place
1	Anna Kartashova	"Miy litak" ("Мій літак")	8	19
2	Tetyana Myza	"Miy drug" ("Мій друг")	20	8
3	Irina Ebralidze	"Namalyuy" ("Намалюй")	18	10
4	Tanya Marchuk	"Vsi razom" ("Всі разом")	24	4
5	Polina Andreyeva	"Mrii u tvoikh rukakh" ("Мрії у твоїх руках")	25	3
6	ExSportize	"Vechirka" ("Вечірка")	9	18
7	Tetyana Gulyk	"Oy, zahray skrypaliu" ("Ой, заграй скрипалю")	22	6
8	Anastasiia Baranovska	"Mama" ("Мама")	17	11
9	Kapriz-Juniors	"Kosmo-dity" ("Космо-діти")	11	16
10	Sofia Tarasova	"Zhyttievyi pazl" ("Життєвий пазл")	19	9
11	Inna Prychepiy	"Tobi" ("Тобі")	7	20
12	Elena Gregori	"Z nykh kozhen" ("З них кожен")	6	21
13	Solomiia	"Mavka" ("Мавка")	16	12
14	Anna Priymak	"Posmikhnis" ("Посміхніс")	15	13
15	Olena Gernega	"Schastia poruch" ("Щастя поруч")	14	14
16	Anastasiya Petryk	"Nebo" ("Небо")	28	1
17	Tanya Shevchuk	"Rozhevi okuliary" ("Рожеві окуляри")	10	17
18	Mykyta Kiosse	"Ikar" ("Ікар")	23	5
19	Akva-Brand	"Pershe kokhannia" ("Перше кохання")	13	14
20	Radiosimia	"Radiosimia" ("Радіосім'я")	12	15
21	Viktoriia Kobzar	"Vid sertsia do sertsia" ("Від серця до серця")	21	7

== At Junior Eurovision ==
At the running order draw, Ukraine were drawn to perform ninth on 1 December 2012, following Armenia and preceding Georgia.

=== Voting ===
Points awarded to Ukraine
Score	Country
12 points (Note: All countries received one set of 12 points to ensure no country finished with nul points.)	Armenia; Belarus; Belgium; Israel; Moldova; Netherlands; Russia; Sweden
10 points	Georgia; Kids Jury
8 points	
7 points	
6 points	Albania
5 points	
4 points	Azerbaijan
3 points	
2 points	
1 point	

Points awarded by Ukraine
Score	Country
12 points	Armenia
10 points	Belarus
8 points	Israel
7 points	Georgia
6 points	Russia
5 points	Azerbaijan
4 points	Moldova
3 points	Netherlands
2 points	Sweden
1 point	Belgium
