= Belarus in the Junior Eurovision Song Contest 2012 =

- Junior Eurovision Song Contest 2012
- Country: Belarus
- Selection process: Song For Eurovision
- Selection date: 28 September 2012

Competing entry
- Song: "A more-more"
- Artist: Egor Zheshko

Placement
- Final result: 9th, 56 points

Participation chronology

Belarus selected their Junior Eurovision Song Contest 2012 act through a national selection on 28 September 2012. Egor Zheshko represented Belarus with the song "A more-more". He placed 9th out of 12 countries in the contest with 56 points.

== Before Junior Eurovision ==
=== Song For Eurovision ===
The national final "Song For Eurovision" was held on 28 September 2012. Ten acts competed for the winning title. Egor Zheshko won with "A more-more", winning 1st place from both the jury and the televiewers.

Final – 28 September 2012
Draw	Artist	Song	Jury	Televote		Total	Place
1	Tatyana Prokhorenko	"Moya dusha"	3	711	1	4	9
2	Daria Atroshenko	"Ne pakiday!"	2	716	2	4	9
3	Anna Trubetskaya & Timur Shushkov	"Etot mir"	10	2037	8	18	2
4	Trio "Deti Solntsa"	"Luna-park"	5	1727	7	12	4
5	Irina Kruglik	"Privet"	4	997	5	9	7
6	Yulia Atroschenko	"Glyane sontsa"	8	3183	10	18	2
7	Antoniy Konoplyanik	"Klub krutyh parney"	7	909	3	10	6
8	Zaranak	"Vot tak"	1	920	4	5	8
9	Valeriya Shepelevich	"Pust' budet tak"	6	1708	6	12	4
10	Egor Zheshko	"A more-more"	12	4428	12	24	1

== At Junior Eurovision ==
During the contest, Belarus opened the show, preceding Sweden. Belarus came 9th with 56 points.

=== Voting ===
Points awarded to Belarus
Score	Country
12 points (Note: All countries received one set of 12 points to ensure no country finished with nul points.)	
10 points	Ukraine
8 points	
7 points	Armenia; Azerbaijan; Georgia
6 points	
5 points	
4 points	Russia
3 points	
2 points	Albania; Belgium; Moldova
1 point	Israel; Sweden

Points awarded by Belarus
Score	Country
12 points	Ukraine
10 points	Russia
8 points	Armenia
7 points	Sweden
6 points	Georgia
5 points	Israel
4 points	Moldova
3 points	Belgium
2 points	Azerbaijan
1 point	Netherlands
