= Albania in the Junior Eurovision Song Contest 2012 =

- Junior Eurovision Song Contest 2012
- Participating broadcaster: Radio Televizioni Shqiptar (RTSH)
- Country: Albania
- Selection process: Junior Fest Albania 2012
- Selection date: 4 October 2012

Competing entry
- Song: "Kam një këngë vetëm për ju"
- Artist: Igzidora Gjeta
- Songwriters: Igzidora Gjeta; Jorgo Papingji; Xhavit Ujkani

Placement
- Final result: 12th, 35 points

Participation chronology

Albania debuted at the Junior Eurovision Song Contest 2012 with Igzidora Gjeta representing the country with the song “Kam një këngë vetëm për ju”. The Albanian entry was selected through a national final called Junior Fest Albania 2012 that was organised by Radio Televizioni Shqiptar (RTSH).

== Before Junior Eurovision ==
On 25 July 2012, it was announced that Albania would debut at the Junior Eurovision Song Contest and it was announced it would use a national final to select its entry. The entries were collected on 14 September 2012, from 10:00 to 14:00 CEST at Direction of Special Projects of TVSH.

=== Junior Fest Albania 2012 ===
On 3 October 2012, the date and the name of the national final Junior Fest Albania 2012 was announced. Junior Fest Albania 2012 was held at 20:45 CET on 4 October 2012 and it was originally announced there were going to be 5 participants but it had 14 participants as announced in the live show. The results were decided by the participants by giving 1, 2 and 3 points.

Final - 4 October 2012
Draw	Artist	Song	Points	Place
1	Ana Maria Isufaj	“Karnavalet”	0	14
2	Ilva Latifi	“Bota e ëndërrave”	3	10
3	Selma Bekteshi	“Si ajër”	7	6
4	Shejla Sulejmani, Keida Dervishi and Joan Mezini	“Ndizi bateritë”	2	12
5	Ambra Troplini	“Le të shkojmë të kërcejmë”	4	7
6	Igzidora Gjeta	“Kam një këngë vetëm për ju”	17	1
7	Klodiana Vata	“Këndoni bashkë me mua”	9	5
8	Sidrita Bollati	“Ëndrra fëminore”	3	9
9	Aurora Kapo	“Blu-Blu-Jeans”	10	2
10	Niki Mjeda	“Pëllumbat fluturojnë”	10	3
11	Uendi Mancaku	“Ëndrra ime flet”	10	4
12	Mishela Rapo	“Mama mia te amo”	4	8
13	Alicia Xhameta	“Jam një Vajzë Shqiptare”	3	11
14	Megi Thaci and Xhesuida Diva	“Tek shtëpia e diellit”	1	13

== At Junior Eurovision ==
At the running order draw, Albania were drawn to perform seventh on 1 December 2012, following Israel and preceding Armenia.

=== Voting ===
Points awarded to Albania
Score	Country
12 points (Note: All countries received one set of 12 points to ensure no country finished with nul points.)	Azerbaijan
10 points	
8 points	
7 points	
6 points	
5 points	
4 points	Moldova
3 points	Israel
2 points	Netherlands
1 point	Armenia; Georgia

Points awarded by Albania
Score	Country
12 points	Sweden
10 points	Azerbaijan
8 points	Netherlands
7 points	Belgium
6 points	Ukraine
5 points	Georgia
4 points	Moldova
3 points	Armenia
2 points	Belarus
1 point	Israel
