= Azerbaijan in the Junior Eurovision Song Contest 2012 =

- Junior Eurovision Song Contest 2012
- Participating broadcaster: İctimai Televiziya (İTV)
- Country: Azerbaijan
- Selection process: Artist: National final Song: Internal selection
- Selection date: Artist: 9 October 2012; Song: 15 October 2012

Competing entry
- Song: "Girls and Boys (Dünya Sənindir)"
- Artist: Omar and Suada
- Songwriters: Jessica Appla; Zahra Badalbeyli; Simon Ellis

Placement
- Final result: 11th, 49 points

Participation chronology

Azerbaijan debuted in the Junior Eurovision Song Contest in 2012 with Omar and Suada representing the country with the song "Girls and Boys (Dünya Sənindir)". The artist was selected through a national final organised by İctimai Televiziya (İTV) and the song was selected through an internal selection.

== Before Junior Eurovision ==
=== National final ===
At the first stage of the national final, 12 entrants were chosen from 31 applicants. Then 5 of them were shortlisted by a jury at the internal casting round to compete in the final.

The final was held on 9 October 2012 at 20:00 CET and was broadcast on İTV. The 5 participants sung 2 cover songs each. The results were only decided by a jury that consisted of Faiq Sücəddinov, Lala Kazimova and Vüqar Camalzadaye. Faiq Aghayev, Isa Melikov, Murad Arif and Ulviyye Veliyeva also gave comments to the participants. It was decided that 2 people would win due to the "recent successes of duets in the international competitions" according to the head of delegation at that time, Hüsniye Magarramova. Eldar Gasimov was a guest at the national final.

Final - 9 October 2012
Artist	Song 1	Song 2
Gamartaj Maqsudova	Unknown	
Narmin Hasanova	Unknown	
Omar Sultanov	Unknown	
Suada Alakbarova	“A Tisket A Tasket”	Unknown
Togrul Karimov	“I Got You (I Feel Good)”	“Ya tebya pomnyu” (“Я тебя помню”)

=== Song selection ===
From over 30 song proposals, "Girls and Boys (Dünya Sənindir)" was chosen as the entry which is written by Jessica Appla, Zehra Badalbeyli and Simon Ellis. The song was originally released on 15 October 2012, but it wasn't allowed due to the song being only in English even though only 25% maximum was allowed. On 8 November 2012, the bilingual version was released which was allowed to compete in the contest.

== At Junior Eurovision ==
At the running order draw, Azerbaijan were drawn to perform seventh on 1 December 2012, following Sweden and preceding Belgium.

=== Voting ===
Points awarded to Azerbaijan
Score	Country
12 points (Note: All countries received one set of 12 points to ensure no country finished with nul points.)	
10 points	Albania
8 points	Georgia
7 points	
6 points	
5 points	Ukraine
4 points	
3 points	Netherlands Russia Sweden
2 points	Belarus Kids Jury
1 point	Belgium

Points awarded by Azerbaijan
Score	Country
12 points	Albania
10 points	Moldova
8 points	Georgia
7 points	Belarus
6 points	Netherlands
5 points	Israel
4 points	Ukraine
3 points	Belgium
2 points	Russia
1 point	Sweden
