= Armenia in the Junior Eurovision Song Contest 2012 =

- Junior Eurovision Song Contest 2012
- Country: Armenia
- Selection process: National final
- Selection date: 30 September 2012

Competing entry
- Song: "Sweetie Baby"
- Artist: Compass Band

Placement
- Final result: 3rd, 98 points

Participation chronology

Armenia selected its entry for the Junior Eurovision Song Contest through a televised national final, held on 30 September 2012, organised by the Armenian national broadcaster Public Television of Armenia (ARMTV). The entry selected was Compass Band with the song Sweetie Baby.

== Before Junior Eurovision ==
=== National final ===
A submission period for artists was held until 20 August 2012. The broadcaster received 20 submissions. The seventeen finalists were revealed on 6 September 2012.

The final took place on 30 September 2012. The winner was decided through a combination of SMS voting (50%) and an "expert" jury (50%).

Final – 30 September 2012
Draw	Artist	Song	Place
1	Flora Mkhitaryan	"Ory" (Օրը)	6
2	Khentutyun Ensemble	"Linum e, chi linum" (Լինում է, չի լինում)	15
3	Tatev Yengibaryan	"Im Rock’y"	3
4	Ninela Mkhitaryan	"Im Ashkhar’y"	14
5	Karen Ohanyan	"Love"	16
6	Marine Abrahamyan	"Stop"	12
7	Milly Miskaryan	"Ser’y tariq chi harcnum"	9
8	Zangak Song Studio	"Tik Tak" (Թիք-Թաք)	16
9	Lusine Ghazaryan	"Yerazanqi tevov'	11
10	Lidushik	"Shnorhavor"	5
11	Vahagn Grigoryan	"Home Sweet home"	2
12	Gayane Ghazaryan	"Come"	8
13	Style	"Knock, Knock"	6
14	Sona Dounoyan	"Tarber enq"	9
15	Mane Araqelyan	"Yergavazq"	13
16	Compass Band	"Sweetie baby"	1
17	Angelina Gasparyan	"My name is Angel"	3

== At Junior Eurovision ==
=== Voting ===
Points awarded to Armenia
Score	Country
12 points (Note: All countries received one set of 12 points to ensure no country finished with nul points.)	Georgia; Ukraine
10 points	Israel; Netherlands; Russia
8 points	Belarus
7 points	Belgium
6 points	Sweden
5 points	Kids Jury
4 points	
3 points	Albania; Moldova
2 points	
1 point	

Points awarded by Armenia
Score	Country
12 points	Ukraine
10 points	Georgia
8 points	Russia
7 points	Belarus
6 points	Israel
5 points	Belgium
4 points	Netherlands
3 points	Moldova
2 points	Sweden
1 point	Albania
