= Moldova in the Junior Eurovision Song Contest 2012 =

- Junior Eurovision Song Contest 2012
- Country: Moldova
- Selection process: National final
- Selection date: 4 October 2012

Competing entry
- Song: "Toate vor fi"
- Artist: Denis Midone

Placement
- Final result: 10th, 52 points

Participation chronology

Moldova was represented at the Junior Eurovision Song Contest 2012, with their entry selected through a non-televised national selection.

== Before Junior Eurovision ==
=== National final ===
6 entries were submitted to TRM, which all were chosen to compete in the national final.

On 4 October 2012, the six entries were performed in front of a jury, which consisted of Georgeta Voinovan, Vlad Mircos, Natali Toma, Adrian Ursu and Ion Chiorpec. Denis Midone was eventually selected as the Moldovan representative for the 2012 contest.

Draw	Artist	Song	Points	Place
1	Nadejda Volc	"Eu cred"	—	—
2	Cătălin Cauş	"Libertate"	—	—
3	Ecaterina Lisin	"Încearcă"	—	—
4	Alina Sorochina	"Între nu şi da"	—	—
5	Denis Midone	"Toate vor fi"	48.5	1
6	Andreea Braga	"My Lucky Light"	—	—

== At Junior Eurovision ==
=== Voting ===
Points awarded to Moldova
Score	Country
12 points (Note: All countries received one set of 12 points to ensure no country finished with nul points.)	
10 points	Azerbaijan
8 points	
7 points	
6 points	
5 points	Israel
4 points	Albania; Belarus; Ukraine
3 points	Armenia; Belgium
2 points	Georgia; Russia; Sweden
1 point	Netherlands

Points awarded by Moldova
Score	Country
12 points	Ukraine
10 points	Russia
8 points	Georgia
7 points	Sweden
6 points	Belgium
5 points	Netherlands
4 points	Albania
3 points	Armenia
2 points	Belarus
1 point	Israel
