= Russia in the Junior Eurovision Song Contest 2012 =

- Junior Eurovision Song Contest 2012
- Country: Russia
- Selection process: National final
- Selection date: 3 June 2012

Competing entry
- Song: "Sensation"
- Artist: Lerika

Placement
- Final result: 4th, 88 points

Participation chronology

Russia was represented at the Junior Eurovision Song Contest 2012 in Amsterdam, Netherlands. The Russian entry was selected through a national final, organised by Russian broadcaster All-Russia State Television and Radio Company (VGTRK). The final was held on 3 June 2012. Valeriya Engalycheva and her song "Sensatsiya" won the national final, getting 12.34% of votes. Engalycheva previously represented Moldova in the Junior Eurovision Song Contest 2011 under her stage name Lerika, which she also used at the 2012 contest.

== Before Junior Eurovision ==
=== National final ===
On 1 March 2012, VGTRK announced that a national final would be held to select Russia' entry for the Junior Eurovision Song Contest 2012. A submission period for interested artists was opened and lasted until 1 May 2012. A professional jury selected twenty artists and songs from the applicants to proceed to the televised national final. The selected artists and songs competed at the national final which took place on 3 June 2012 at the "Akademichesky" concert hall in Moscow, hosted by Dmitry Guberniev and Oksana Fedorova. The winner was determined by a 50/50 combination of jury voting and televoting. The members of the jury were Yury Entin, Maksim Dunayevsky, Gennady Gokhstein, Grygory Gladkov, Larisa Rubalskaya and Alexander Igudin. In addition to the performances from the competitors, the show featured guest performances by Buranovskiye Babushki, Katya Ryabova and Erik Rapp.

Final – 3 June 2012
Draw	Artist	Song	Percentage	Place
1	Sorvantsy	"Idut geroi kino" (Идут герои кино)	8.12%	5
2	Lyoma Nalgiyeva	"Moya mechta" (Моя мечта)	8.57%	3
3	Aleksandra Boldareva	"12345 (Pro mechtu)" (Про мечту)	5.88%	7
4	Akademiya Volshebnikov	"Shag navstrechu solntsu" (Шаг навстречу солнцу)	2.72%	16
5	Ivan Pomarkov	"Raz, dva, tri" (Раз, два, три)	8.35%	4
6	Alisa Sementina	"No Barbie, No Ken!"	3.64%	11
7	Valeriya Engalycheva	"Sensatsiya" (Сенсация)	12.34%	1
8	Vladlena Bogdanova	"V dvuh shagah ot mechty" (В двух шагах от мечты)	3.17%	13
9	Renata Tazetdinova	"Angel" (Ангел)	4.19%	9
10	Ivan Smidovich	"Pervaya lyubov" (Первая любовь)	2.96%	14
11	Tonika	"Zdravstvuy, solntse" (Здравствуй, солнце)	3.85%	10
12	Elizaveta Shorohova	"Ya naydu" (Я найду)	1.94%	19
13	Bon Su Hyon	"Evro, evro" (Евро, евро)	3.22%	12
14	Evgeny Shkunov	"Mama – ty eshyo molodaya!" (Мама – ты ещё молодая!)	2.59%	17
15	Delfin	"Hip hop" (Хип хоп)	7.23%	6
16	Vasilisa Matveyeva	"Stranny kot" (Странный кот)	5.58%	8
17	Dayana Kirillova	"Pyat minut do uroka" (Пять минут до урока)	9.04%	2
18	Alina Morozova	"Devochka-vredina" (Девочка-вредина)	2.86%	15
19	Kristina Kulesh	"Superstar"	2.37%	18
20	Aleksey Myshkaryov	"Tebe daryu!" (Тебе дарю!)	1.38%	20

== At Junior Eurovision ==
During the allocation draw on 15 October 2012, Russia was drawn to perform 5th, following Belgium and preceding Israel. Russia placed 4th, scoring 88 points.

In Russia, show were broadcast on Russia-1 with commentary by Olga Shelest. The Russian spokesperson revealing the result of the Russian vote was Valentin Sadiki.

=== Voting ===
Points awarded to Russia
Score	Country
12 points (Note: All countries received one set of 12 points to ensure no country finished with nul points.)	
10 points	Belarus; Moldova
8 points	Armenia; Belgium; Kids Jury; Sweden
7 points	
6 points	Georgia; Netherlands; Ukraine
5 points	
4 points	Israel
3 points	
2 points	Azerbaijan
1 point	

Points awarded by Russia
Score	Country
12 points	Ukraine
10 points	Armenia
8 points	Israel
7 points	Belgium
6 points	Georgia
5 points	Sweden
4 points	Belarus
3 points	Azerbaijan
2 points	Moldova
1 point	Netherlands
