= Israel in the Junior Eurovision Song Contest 2012 =

- Junior Eurovision Song Contest 2012
- Country: Israel
- Selection process: Internal Selection
- Selection date: 13 October 2012

Competing entry
- Song: "Let the Music Win"
- Artist: Kids.il
- Songwriters: Ohad Hitman

Placement
- Final result: 8th, 68 points

Participation chronology

Israel was represented at the Junior Eurovision Song Contest 2012 which took place on 1 December 2012, in Amsterdam, The Netherlands, and thus, made its debut at the Junior Eurovision Song Contest. The Israeli broadcaster Israel Broadcasting Authority (IBA) was responsible for organising their entry for the contest, and they chose the kids band Kids.il performing the song "Let The Music Win" to represent Israel in its first competition.

== Artist and song information ==
=== Kids.il ===
Kids.il is an Israeli music group consisting of six child singers. Their song entry, "Let The Music Win" was Israel's first entry in the whole competition. It is composed and written by Ohad Hitman. It was the sixth song in the night of the competition, following Russia and preceding Albania. ending in 8th place with 68 points in a field of 12 competing countries.

Group members are:

- Adel Korshov was born on 20 November 2001 (age 23).
- Adi Mesilati was born on 31 July 1998 (age 26).
- Bar Zemach was born on 17 July 2000 (age 24).
- Daniel Pruzansky was born on 30 September 1999 (age 25).
- Libi Panker was born on 29 March 1998 (age 27).
- Tali Sorokin was born on 12 February 2002 (age 23).
- Adi Bity (Hebrew: עדי ביטי; born 26 May 2001 (age 24))

=== Let the Music Win ===
(Israel) "Let the Music Win"

Junior Eurovision Song Contest 2012 entry
- Country: Israel
- Artist(s): Kids.il
- Languages: Hebrew, English, French, Russian
- Composer(s): Ohad Hitman
- Lyricist(s): Ohad Hitman

Finals performance
- Final result: 8th
- Final points: 68

Entry chronology
- "Follow My Heart" (2016) ►

== At Junior Eurovision ==
Kids.il performed sixth in the night of the competition, following Russia and preceding Albania. At the close of the voting it had received 68 points, placing 8th in a field of 12 competing countries.

=== Voting ===
Points awarded to Israel
Score	Country
12 points (Note: All countries received one set of 12 points to ensure no country finished with nul points.)	
10 points	
8 points	Russia; Ukraine
7 points	Netherlands
6 points	Armenia
5 points	Azerbaijan; Belarus
4 points	Belgium; Kids Jury; Sweden
3 points	Georgia
2 points	
1 point	Albania; Moldova

Points awarded by Israel
Score	Country
12 points	Ukraine
10 points	Armenia
8 points	Georgia
7 points	Sweden
6 points	Belgium
5 points	Moldova
4 points	Russia
3 points	Albania
2 points	Netherlands
1 point	Belarus
