= Georgia in the Junior Eurovision Song Contest 2012 =

- Junior Eurovision Song Contest 2012
- Country: Georgia
- Selection process: Internal selection
- Announcement date: 10 October 2012

Competing entry
- Song: "Funky Lemonade"
- Artist: The Funkids

Placement
- Final result: 2nd, 103 points

Participation chronology

Georgia selected their Junior Eurovision Song Contest 2012 entry through an internal selection for the first time. Georgian Public Broadcaster (GPB) was responsible for organising their entry for the contest. On 10 October 2012, it was revealed that the Funkids would represent Georgia in the contest with the song "Funky Lemonade".

== Background ==
Prior to the 2012 contest, Georgia had participated in the Junior Eurovision Song Contest five times since its début in 2007. They have never missed an edition of the contest, and have won twice at the 2008, and 2011 contests.

== Before Junior Eurovision ==
For the first time since their début in the contest, the Georgian broadcaster GPB decided select their 2012 artist internally. GPB selected the Funkids to represent Georgia in Amsterdam. Originally, Georgia was to select a song for the Funkids through a national selection process, however this was cancelled due to the GPB's desire to focus on the Georgian parliamentary election. Instead, on 10 October 2012, it was revealed that the Funkids were to perform the song "Funky Lemonade".

== Artist and song information ==
=== The Funkids ===
The Funkids
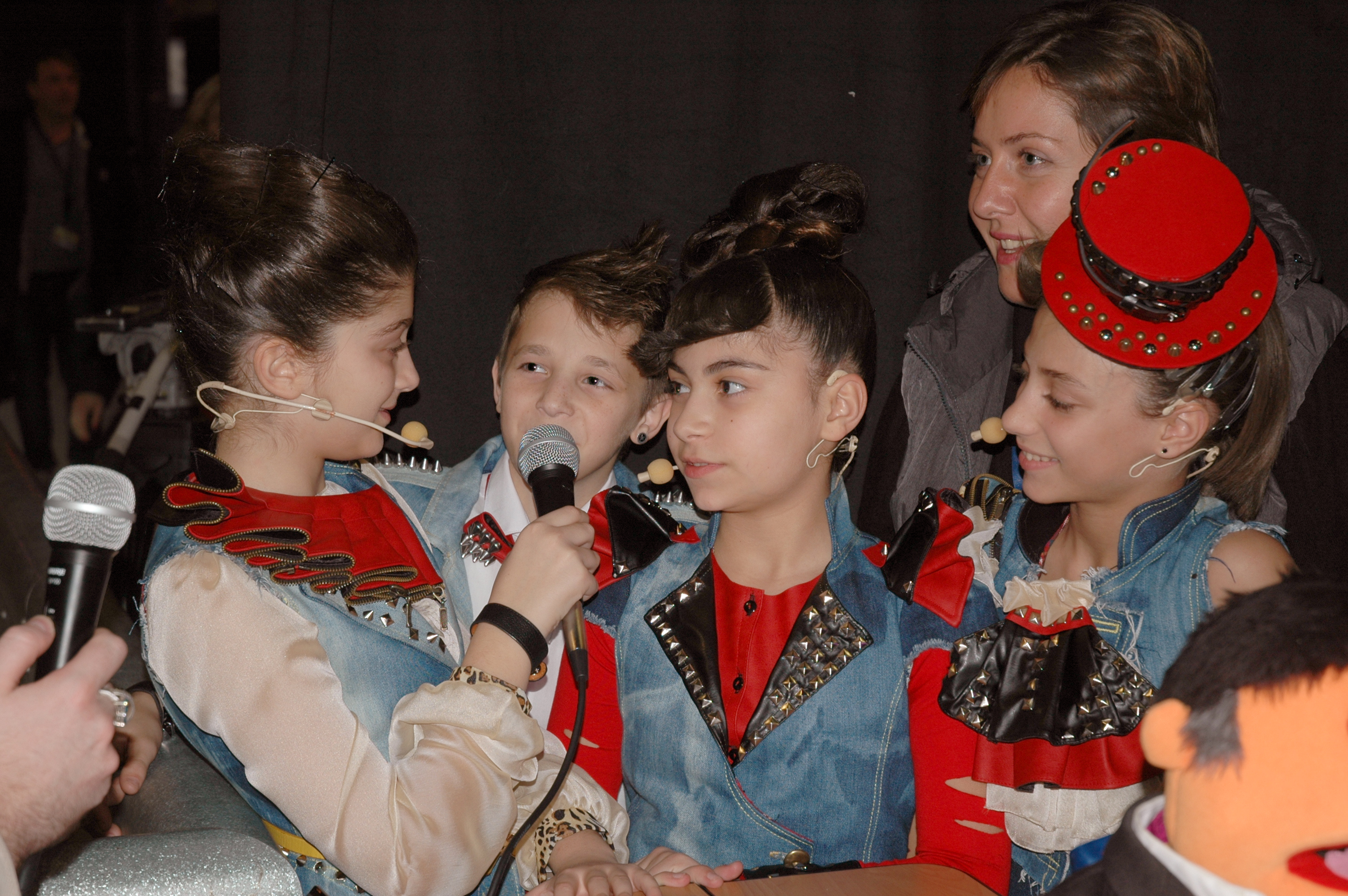

Background information
- Origin: Tbilisi, Georgia
- Genres: Pop
- Years active: 2012–present
- Members: Ketevan Samkharadze; Nino Dashniani; Luka Karmazanashvili; Elene Arachashvili

The Funkids are a Georgian band who represented Georgia in the Junior Eurovision Song Contest 2012 with their song "Funky Lemonade" which came second with a total of 103 points. They consist of Ketevan Samkharadze, Nino Dashniani, Luka Karmazanashvili and Elene Arachashvili.

=== Funky Lemonade ===
(Georgia (country)) "Funky Lemonade"
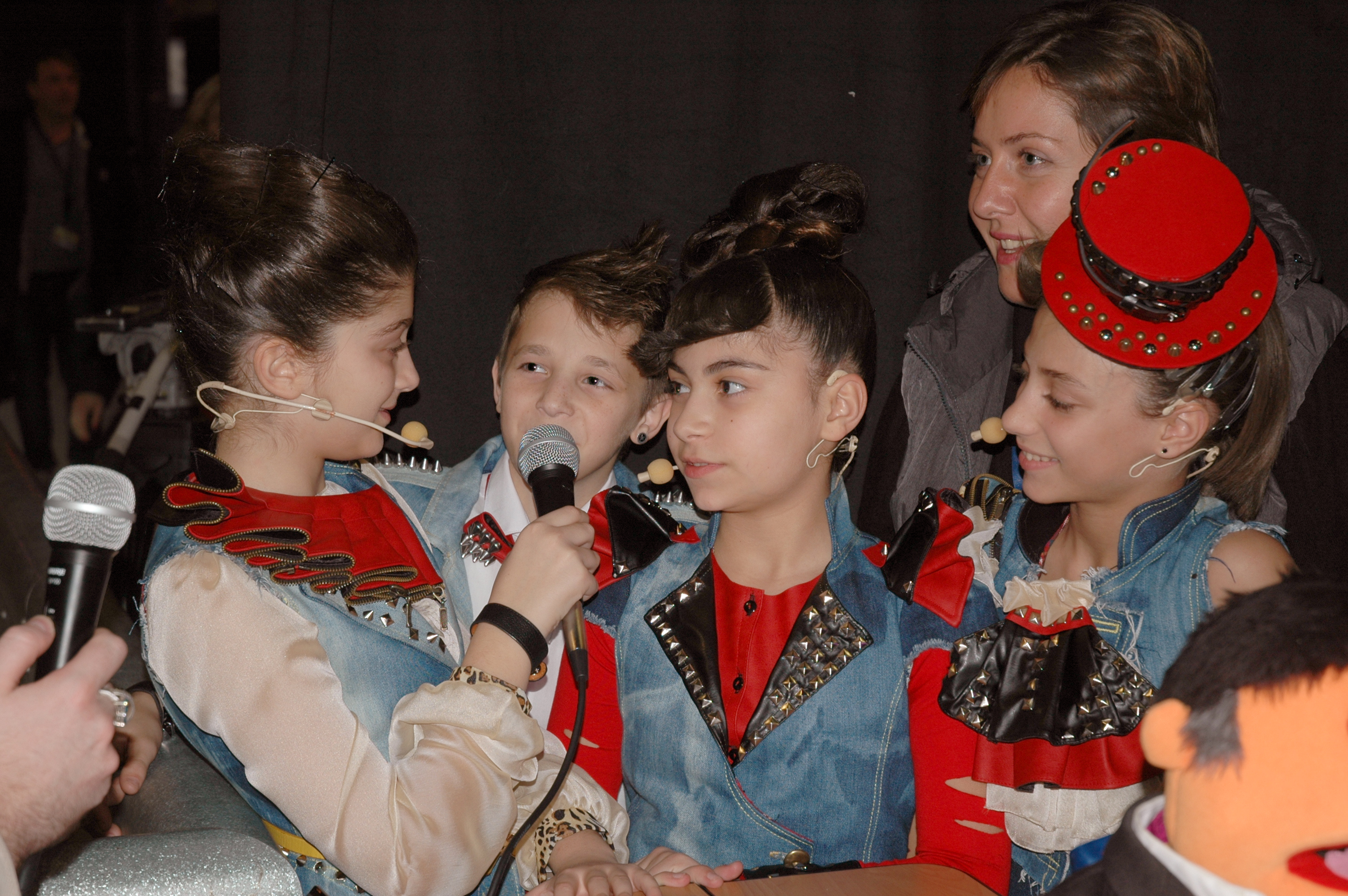

Junior Eurovision Song Contest 2012 entry
- Country: Georgia
- Artist: The Funkids
- Languages: Georgian, English
- Composer: Giga Kukhianidze
- Lyricist: Nana Tstintsadze

Finals performance
- Final result: 2nd
- Final points: 103

Entry chronology
- ◄ "Candy Music" (2011)
- "Give Me Your Smile" (2013) ►

"Funky Lemonade" is a song by Georgian band The Funkids. It represented Georgia during the Junior Eurovision Song Contest 2012. It is composed and written by Giga Kukhianidze and Nana Tstintsadze with help from the Funkids themselves.

== At Junior Eurovision ==
At the running order draw, which took place on 15 October 2012, Georgia were drawn to perform tenth on 1 December 2012, following Ukraine and preceding Moldova.

=== Final ===
Ketevan, Nino and Elene lined up on stage behind Luka who showcased a variety of dances in front of them. The background featured a rotating bottle of lemonade.

=== Voting ===
Points awarded to Georgia
Score	Country
12 points (Note: All countries received one set of 12 points to ensure no country finished with nul points.)	Kids Jury
10 points	Armenia; Sweden
8 points	Azerbaijan; Israel; Moldova
7 points	Ukraine
6 points	Belarus; Belgium; Russia
5 points	Albania; Netherlands
4 points	
3 points	
2 points	
1 point	

Points awarded by Georgia
Score	Country
12 points	Armenia
10 points	Ukraine
8 points	Azerbaijan
7 points	Belarus
6 points	Russia
5 points	Netherlands
4 points	Belgium
3 points	Israel
2 points	Moldova
1 point	Albania
