= Netherlands in the Junior Eurovision Song Contest 2012 =

2012 Junior Eurovision participation

- Junior Eurovision Song Contest 2012
- Country: Netherlands
- Selection process: Junior Songfestival 2012; 33% Jury; 33% Kids Jury; 33% Televoting
- Selection date: Semi-finals: 22 September 2012; 29 September 2012; Final: 6 October 2012

Competing entry
- Song: "Tik Tak Tik"
- Artist: Femke

Placement
- Final result: 7th, 69 points

Participation chronology

The Netherlands selected their Junior Eurovision Song Contest 2012 entry through Junior Songfestival, a national selection consisting of eight songs.

In the second semi-final, there was a tie between Femke, and Sterre. It was decided Femke would have the second place spot due to the higher points on public vote, with Sterre getting the wildcard from online voting.

== Before Junior Eurovision ==
=== Junior Songfestival 2012 ===
The songs were split into two semi-finals. From each semi-final two entries will qualify for the final based on the decision of adult and child juries as well as televoting. The fifth entry in the final will be chosen by online voting (web wildcard).

==== Competing entries ====
| Artist | Song | Songwriter(s) |
|---|---|---|
| Alessandro | "Una chica especial" | Alessandro Wempe, Jozien Van Dorst, Renaldo van Tuil, Wesley Glasmacher |
| Amy | "Boom Boom" | Amy van der Wel |
| Femke | "Tik Tak Tik" | Femke Meines, Tjeerd Oosterhuis |
| Jade & Sherilyn | "Joy" | Jade Seenarine, Sherilyn Lo Tam Loi |
| Kim | "Digidoe" | Kim de Koning |
| MainStreet | "Stop the Time" | MainStreet, Joachim Vermeulen Windsant, Maarten ten Hove, William Laseroms |
| Melle | "Dromen" | Melle Boddaert, Tjeerd van Zanen |
| Sterre | "I'm Singing" | Sterre Zangirolami, Tjeerd Oosterhuis |

==== Semi-final 1 ====
Semi-final 1 – 22 September 2012
| Draw | Artist | Song | Kids Jury | Jury | Televote | Total | Place |
|---|---|---|---|---|---|---|---|
| 1 | Amy | "Boom Boom" | 12 | 9 | 8 | 29 | 3 |
| 2 | MainStreet | "Stop the Time" | 8 | 12 | 12 | 32 | 1 |
| 3 | Kim | "Digidoe" | 9 | 8 | 9 | 26 | 4 |
| 4 | Melle | "Dromen" | 10 | 10 | 10 | 30 | 2 |

==== Semi-final 2 ====
Semi-final 2 – 29 September 2012
| Draw | Artist | Song | Kids Jury | Jury | Televote | Total | Place |
|---|---|---|---|---|---|---|---|
| 1 | Femke | "Tik Tak Tik" | 12 | 8 | 10 | 30 | 2 |
| 2 | Alessandro | "Una chica especial" | 10 | 10 | 12 | 32 | 1 |
| 3 | Jade & Sherilyn | "Joy" | 8 | 9 | 8 | 25 | 4 |
| 4 | Sterre | "I'm Singing" | 9 | 12 | 9 | 30 | 3 |

=== Final ===
Final – 6 October 2012
| Draw | Artist | Song | Kids Jury | Jury | Televote | Total | Place |
|---|---|---|---|---|---|---|---|
| 1 | Femke | "Tik Tak Tik" | 12 | 10 | 9 | 31 | 1 |
| 2 | MainStreet | "Stop the Time" | 7 | 7 | 12 | 26 | 3 |
| 3 | Alessandro | "Una chica especial" | 8 | 12 | 10 | 30 | 2 |
| 4 | Sterre | "I'm Singing" | 10 | 9 | 7 | 26 | 4 |
| 5 | Melle | "Dromen" | 9 | 8 | 8 | 25 | 5 |

== At Junior Eurovision ==
=== Voting ===
Points awarded to the Netherlands
| Score | Country |
|---|---|
| 12 points (Note: All countries received one set of 12 points to ensure no country finished with nul points.) | |
| 10 points | Belgium |
| 8 points | Albania |
| 7 points | Kids Jury |
| 6 points | Azerbaijan |
| 5 points | Georgia; Moldova; Sweden |
| 4 points | Armenia |
| 3 points | Ukraine |
| 2 points | Israel |
| 1 point | Belarus; Russia |

Points awarded by the Netherlands
| Score | Country |
|---|---|
| 12 points | Ukraine |
| 10 points | Armenia |
| 8 points | Belgium |
| 7 points | Israel |
| 6 points | Russia |
| 5 points | Georgia |
| 4 points | Sweden |
| 3 points | Azerbaijan |
| 2 points | Albania |
| 1 point | Moldova |
