= Omloop =

Omloop is a surname. Notable people with the surname include:

- Geert Omloop (born 1974), Belgian road racing cyclist
- Laura Omloop (born 1999), Belgian pop singer
- Wim Omloop (born 1971), Belgian cyclist
