= Femke Meines =

Dutch singer and actress (born 2000)

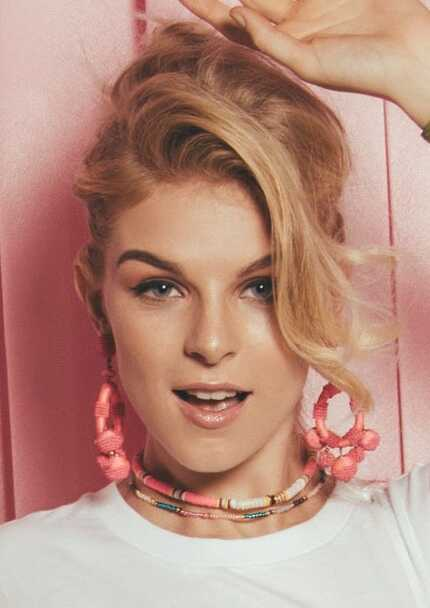
- Meines in 2019

Background information
- Born: 11 May 2000 (age 26); Tuitjenhorn, Netherlands
- Occupations: Singer; actress
- Instrument: Vocals
- Years active: 2012–present
- Label: VanStam Music
- Website: femkemeines.nl

Femke Meines (pronounced [ˈfɛmkə ˈmɛinəs]; born 11 May 2000) is a Dutch singer and actress. Meines began her career at age 12, when she represented the Netherlands in the Junior Eurovision Song Contest 2012, placing seventh. From 2016 to 2017, Meines portrayed Liz in the Disney Channel Netherlands & Flanders series Just Like Me!.

== Discography ==
=== Albums ===
- Junior Songfestival '12

=== Singles ===
- "Tik tak tik" (Tick Tock Tick)
- "JSF Party"
- "Dan kies ik voor jou" (Then I'll choose you)
- "Kerst met jou" (Christmas with You)
- "Dat Zijn Wij" (That's Us)
- "Op grote schouders" (On Large Shoulders)
- "Geen zin" (I don't feel like it)
- "Unica"
- "Smelt" (Melt)
- "Nog een kus" (One More Kiss)
- "Just Like Me"
- "Wazig" (Misty)
- "Keppie"
- "Dichterbij" (Official Title Track of Dutch Movie "Engel")
- "Mooi Begint Van Binnen"

Awards and achievements
Preceded by Rachel Traets with Teenager	Netherlands in the Junior Eurovision Song Contest; 2012	Succeeded by Mylène and Rosanne with Double Me
