= MainStreet (band) =

Dutch boy band

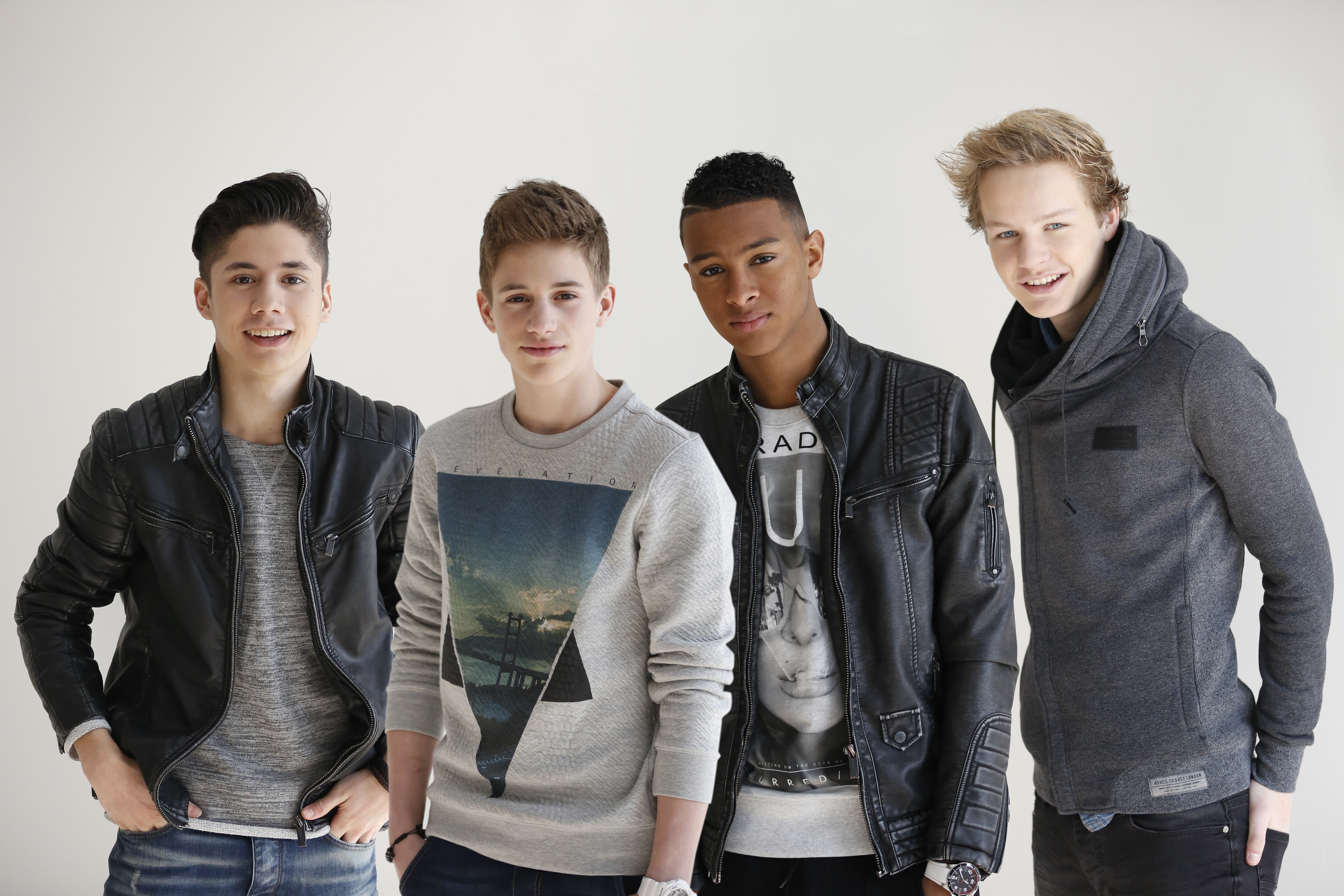

Background information
- Origin: Netherlands
- Genre: Pop
- Years active: 2011–2016; 2025–2026 (one off reunion)
- Label: New Skool/Universal Music
- Past members: Nils Käller; Owen Gregory Playfair; Rein van Duivenboden; Daan Zwierinck
- Website: www.mainstreetmusic.nl

MainStreet was a Dutch boy band, consisting of Nils Käller, Daan Zwierink, Owen Playfair and Rein van Duivenboden. The group gained attention after participating in Junior Songfestival 2012.

== History ==
=== 2011–2013: Formation and Junior Songfestival ===
Main Street was created in 2011 after Käller, Zwierink, Playfair and van Duivenboden individually auditioned for the first season of The Voice Kids.

Because the four boys are from across the Netherlands, it was initially difficult to work together, as they had, in addition to their music, school and other activities that they are doing. The four boys finally managed to get actively engaged with each other, and wrote the song "Stop the time". With this song, they entered the Junior Songfestival 2012, the Dutch national selection for the Junior Eurovision Song Contest. With 32 points in the semi-final they came first, ahead of the other 3 contestants. Ultimately MainStreet came third in the final. It received the fewest points from the children's juries, but the most points from televoting. MainStreet is the first act in ten years of the Junior Eurovision, whose single was already in the Top 100 Charts without a winner yet designated. To date, only the singles of the winners after the final made it to the Single Top 100. The video for Stop the time is the most viewed video in Junior Song Festival history with almost 5 million views to date.

=== 2013-2014: Record deal and debut album ===
On 30 January, the boys signed a record deal with New Skool Records, a new label formed by Future presidents in collaboration with Universal. The second single Mind is blown was released on 15 February and the debut album followed on 29 March. Mind is blown enters the single charts at number 8 and it is the definitive breakthrough for the boys in The Netherlands. The music video reaches over 4,5 million views on YouTube and there is hysteria everywhere the boys go. The album Breaking The Rules enters at number one in the album charts and becomes one of the most successful albums of the year.

Two concerts went on sale on 2 February and sold out in the record time of 11 minutes. Shortly after they announced a tour titled The MainTour which also sold out rapidly.

On 13 April they opened for Justin Bieber's Believe Tour at the Gelredome for over 30.000 people.

On the 20 September they released another title song, this time for the new hit Disney Series Violetta. The music video for The World is Mine premiered on the Disney Channel and scored the highest ratings to date.

The fifth single from the successful album Breaking the Rules was released on 8 November. The song Hell's a lot like Love was co-written by Jorgen Elofsson, known for writing hits for Kelly Clarkson, Westlife, Britney Spears and many others. This new version of the song is featured on the deluxe edition of the album including a DVD. The special edition entered at number 8 on the albumcharts.

On 19 December the album track My Main Girl was added as a DLC to the popular videogame Just Dance 2014. MainStreet is the first Dutch act to have their song added to a Just Dance game.

The group ended the year with the biggest concert ever given by a Dutch boyband. 6000 fans came to see the boys in the Americahal in Apeldoorn on 22 December.

=== 2014-2016: Living Our Dream and Runaway ===
On 18 January, MainStreet performs at the critically acclaimed Eurosonic Festival.

The new single Dreamers was the first of four singles to be released in four months time. The song talks about bullying and the boys become ambassadeurs of anti bullying. They also launch the first national online forum where kids can, anonymously, talk about problems at home or at school. The song premiered on national radio station 3FM and they perform it for the first time on national TV during the BNN show Stop Pesten (Stop Bullying) on the national day against bullying. The lyrics are inspired by actual stories read in fanmail letters to the boys.

The 2000 tickets for their show on 27 April in Vredenburg Leidsche Rijn in Utrecht sold out within two weeks. They announced the 2014 MainTour straight after.

The documentary movie Living Our Dream was released in cinemas on 31 May. All tickets sold out and the DVD release entered at number one on the DVD charts shortly after.

The boys release three other singles; Miss Wonderful, All We Wanna Do and The Missing Piece. And on 10 October they release their first English single Runaway. It shoots into the top 3 on iTunes straight away. The second album, also titled Runaway, was released a week later and entered the album charts at number 3.

On 16 November MainStreet became the first band in history to release a fanfiction book through publisher Kluitman. The story MainStreet - Een onverwacht spannende vakantie was originally written by one of their fans and re-written by the author Victioria Farkas. Hundreds of fanfiction stories were sent in by fans.

On 27 November the boys announced a new concert at TivoliVredenburg in Utrecht on 5 April 2015. The 2000 tickets were also sold out quickly.

=== 2015-2016; 2025-2026: Ambassadeurs of Freedom, split, and reunion ===
On 17 January 3FM DJ Paul Rabbering announced the ambassadeurs of freedom for 2015 at Eurosonic. Each year a few of the most successful artists or bands in The Netherlands are chosen for the honor to perform at several liberation festivals on 5 May. They are flown by military helicopters from one venue to the next. MainStreet shares the honor with Caro Emerald, Dotan and Jett Rebel.

On 15 April (Nils' Birthday) the new single 'Ticket to the Moon' premiered at one of the most popular radio shows in the country, Giel Beelen at radio 3FM. The single is released on 24 April and within hours it reached top 10 on iTunes. The single is the titlesong for the upcoming Dutch movie SpangaS in Actie'.

On 1 May the boys are in charge of newspaper Metro

On the same day the new EP #PLAY is released and tops the iTunes charts.

The musicvideo for 'Dear Kitty (Song for Anne)' premieres at the Metro news website. The lyrics talk about Kitty, Anne Frank's diary and has been written especially for theater piece ANNE. The boys will also play the song at the liberation Festivals on 5 May.

In April 2016 the band announced they were breaking up.

In September 2025, the band announced a one off reunion tour, which kicked off on the 1st, 2nd, 3rd, and 8th of May 2026 at the TivoliVredenburg.

== Members ==
| Name | Date of Birth | Place of Birth |
|---|---|---|
| Nils Käller | 15 April 1998 (age 28) | Amsterdam |
| Daan Zwierink | 10 March 1998 (age 28) | Goor |
| Rein van Duivenboden | 21 January 1999 (age 27) | Waalre |
| Owen Gregory Playfair | 28 May 1998 (age 28) | Purmerend |

== Discography ==
=== Studio albums ===
| Year | Album details | Peak | Certifications (sales threshold) |
| Year | Album details | NL | Certifications (sales threshold) |
|---|---|---|---|
| 2013 | Breaking the Rules: Released: 29 March 2013; Label: New Skool Records, Universal Music Netherlands; Format: CD, digital download | 1 | NVPI: Gold |
| 2014 | Runaway: Released: 17 October 2014; Label: New Skool Records; Format: CD, digital download | 3 | |

=== Compilation albums ===
| Year | Album details | Peak |
| Year | Album details | NL |
|---|---|---|
| 2015 | Change Is Good: The Singles Collection: Released: 20 November 2015; Label: New Skool Records; Format: CD, digital download | 26 |

=== Singles ===
==== As lead artist ====
List of singles as lead artist, showing selected chart positions and associated albums
| Title | Year | Peak chart positions | | Album |
| Title | Year | Dutch Mega Single Top 100 | Dutch Top 40 | Album |
|---|---|---|---|---|
| "Stop the Time" | 2012 | 56 | — | Breaking the Rules |
| "Mind is Blown" | 2013 | 8 | 30 | Breaking the Rules |
| "My Main Girl" | 2013 | 92 | — | Breaking the Rules |
| "Miss Wonderful" | 2014 | 51 | — | Runaway |
"—" denotes a single that did not chart or was not released in that territory.

==== As featured artist ====
List of singles as featured artist, showing selected chart positions
| Title | Year | Peak chart positions | |
| Title | Year | Dutch Mega Single Top 100 | Dutch Top 40 |
|---|---|---|---|
| "JSF party" (as part of Finalisten Junior Songfestival 2012) | 2012 | 77 | — |
"—" denotes a single that did not chart or was not released in that territory.
