= Israel in the Junior Eurovision Song Contest =

- Junior Eurovision Song Contest
- Participating broadcaster: Israel Broadcasting Authority (IBA; 2012; 2016); Israeli Public Broadcasting Corporation (IPBC/Kan; 2018)

Participation summary
- Appearances: 3
- First appearance: 2012
- Last appearance: 2018
- Highest placement: 8th: 2012
- Participation history: 2012; 2013 – 2015; 2016; 2017; 2018; 2019 – 2026
- For the most recent participation see Israel in the Junior Eurovision Song Contest 2018

Israel has been represented at the Junior Eurovision Song Contest three times since 2012. The Israel Broadcasting Authority (IBA) participated in 2012 and 2016, with the Israeli Public Broadcasting Corporation (IPBC/Kan) taking over in 2018. Its first entry was "Let the Music Win" by Kids.il, which finished in eighth place out of twelve participating entries. "Follow My Heart" by Shir and Tim placed 15th in 2016, and the most recent Israeli entry, "Children Like These" by Noam Dadon, placed 14th in 2018. The country has not participated again since.

== History ==
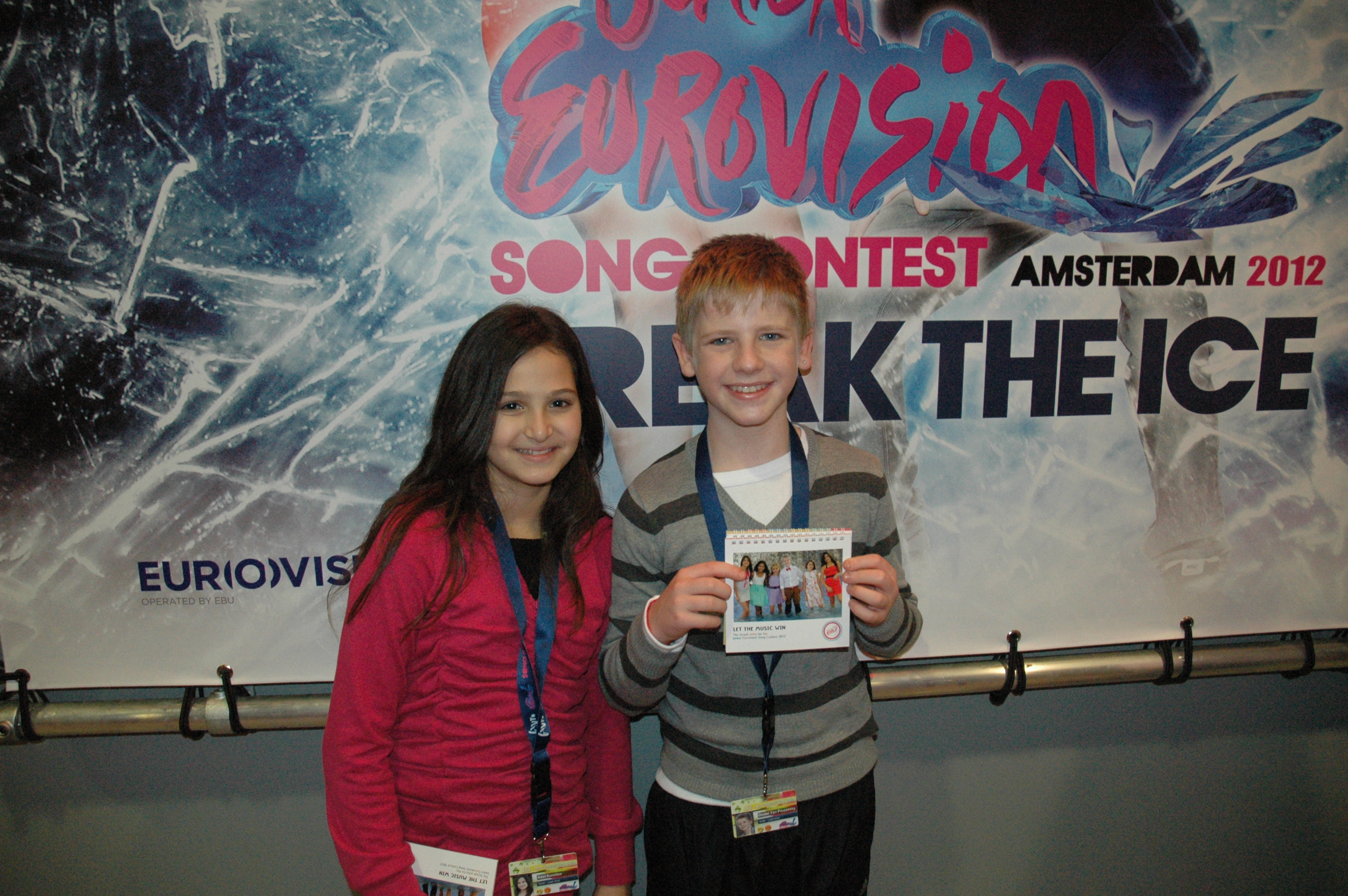
Kids.il at Junior Eurovision 2012.

On 10 July 2012, the Israeli national broadcaster, Israel Broadcasting Authority (IBA), announced that they would be making their Junior Eurovision debut at the 2012 contest in Amsterdam, Netherlands on 1 December 2012. IBA internally selected a sextet group consisting of members Adel Korshov, Adi Bity, Adi Mesilati, Daniel Pruzansky, Libi Panker, and Tali Sorokin. The group who were known by their band name Kids.il, performed the song "Let the Music Win", which finished in eighth place achieving a score of sixty-eight points. Israel has previously shown interest to take part in the 2004 and 2008 contests, although no reasons were ever published to detail the change of interest.

On 21 October 2013, IBA announced their withdrawal from the 2013 contest. However, no details were published as to provide reasons for their withdrawal. Israel continue to be absent from the 2014, and 2015 contests. Following Israel's success at the 2015 and 2016 Eurovision Song Contests, the Israeli broadcaster IBA expressed their interest in a potential return to the Junior Eurovision Song Contest 2016. On 28 September 2016, Israel's participation was officially confirmed by the EBU. On 25 July 2018 it was announced that Israel would return in the 2018 contest, following a change in the contest rules to allow more than 18 countries to participate. The country was given special dispensation by the host broadcaster BTRC and the EBU as they had won the adult contest earlier that year.

== Participation overview ==
Year	Artist	Song	Language	Place	Points
2012	Kids.il	"Let the Music Win"	Hebrew (Note: Contains several lines in English, French and Russian)	8	68
2016	Shir and Tim	"Follow My Heart"	Hebrew, English	15	27
2018	Noam Dadon	"Children Like These"	Hebrew	14	81

== Commentators and spokespersons ==
The contests are broadcast online worldwide through the official Junior Eurovision Song Contest website junioreurovision.tv and YouTube. In 2015, the online broadcasts featured commentary in English by junioreurovision.tv editor Luke Fisher and 2011 Bulgarian Junior Eurovision Song Contest entrant Ivan Ivanov. The Israeli broadcaster, IBA, never sent their own commentator to the 2012 contest. However, a spokesperson was chosen in order to announce the awarding points from Israel. The table below list the details of each commentator and spokesperson since 2012.

Year	Commentator	Spokesperson	Ref.
2005 (Note: Broadcast on 7 December 2007.)	No commentary	Did not participate	
2006 (Note: Broadcast on 8 December 2007.)	No commentary	Did not participate	
2007	No commentary	Did not participate	
2008–2011	No broadcast	Did not participate	
2012	No commentary	Maayan Aloni	
2013–2015	No broadcast	Did not participate	
2016	No commentary	Itay Limor	
2017	No commentary	Did not participate	
2018	Dudu Erez and Alma Zohar	Adi	
2019	Unknown	Did not participate	
2020–2026	No broadcast	Did not participate	

== See also ==
- Israel in the Eurovision Song Contest – Senior version of the Junior Eurovision Song Contest.
