= Anastasiya Petryk =

Ukrainian singer (born 2002)

Anastasiya Petryk Анастасія Петрик
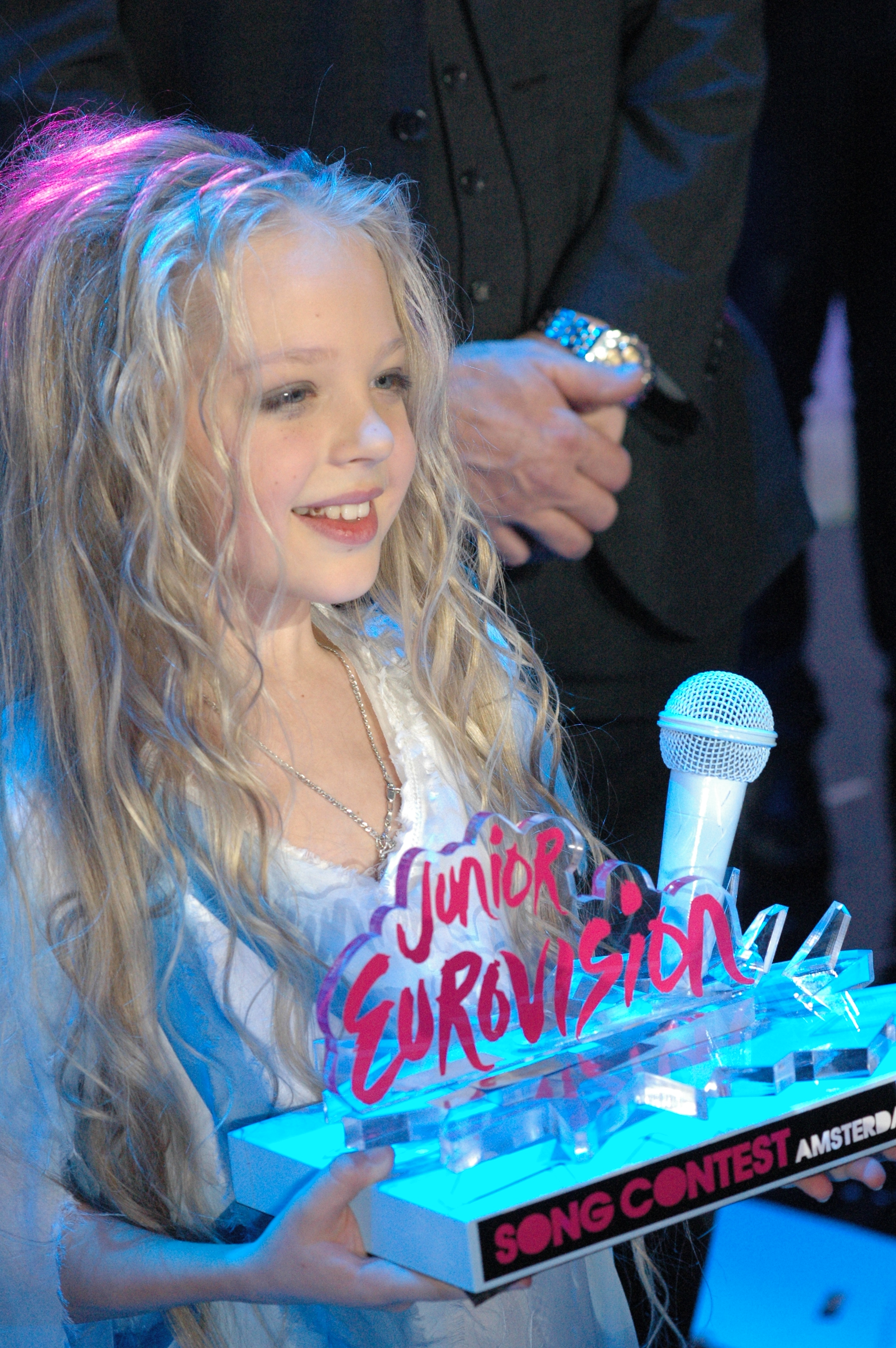
- Petryk after winning the Junior Eurovision Song Contest 2012

Background information
- Born: 4 May 2002 (age 24); Odesa, Ukraine
- Genre: Pop
- Occupation: Singer
- Instrument: Vocals
- Years active: 2008–present
- Website: petryksisters.com

Anastasiya Ihorivna Petryk (Note: Ukrainian: Анастасія Ігорівна Петрик, romanized: Anastasiia Ihorivna Petryk) (born 4 May 2002, known by the diminutive Nastya) (Note: Ukrainian: Настя, romanized: Nastia) is a Ukrainian singer. She won the Junior Eurovision Song Contest 2012 with the song "Nebo", becoming the first Ukrainian entrant to win the competition.

== Life and work ==
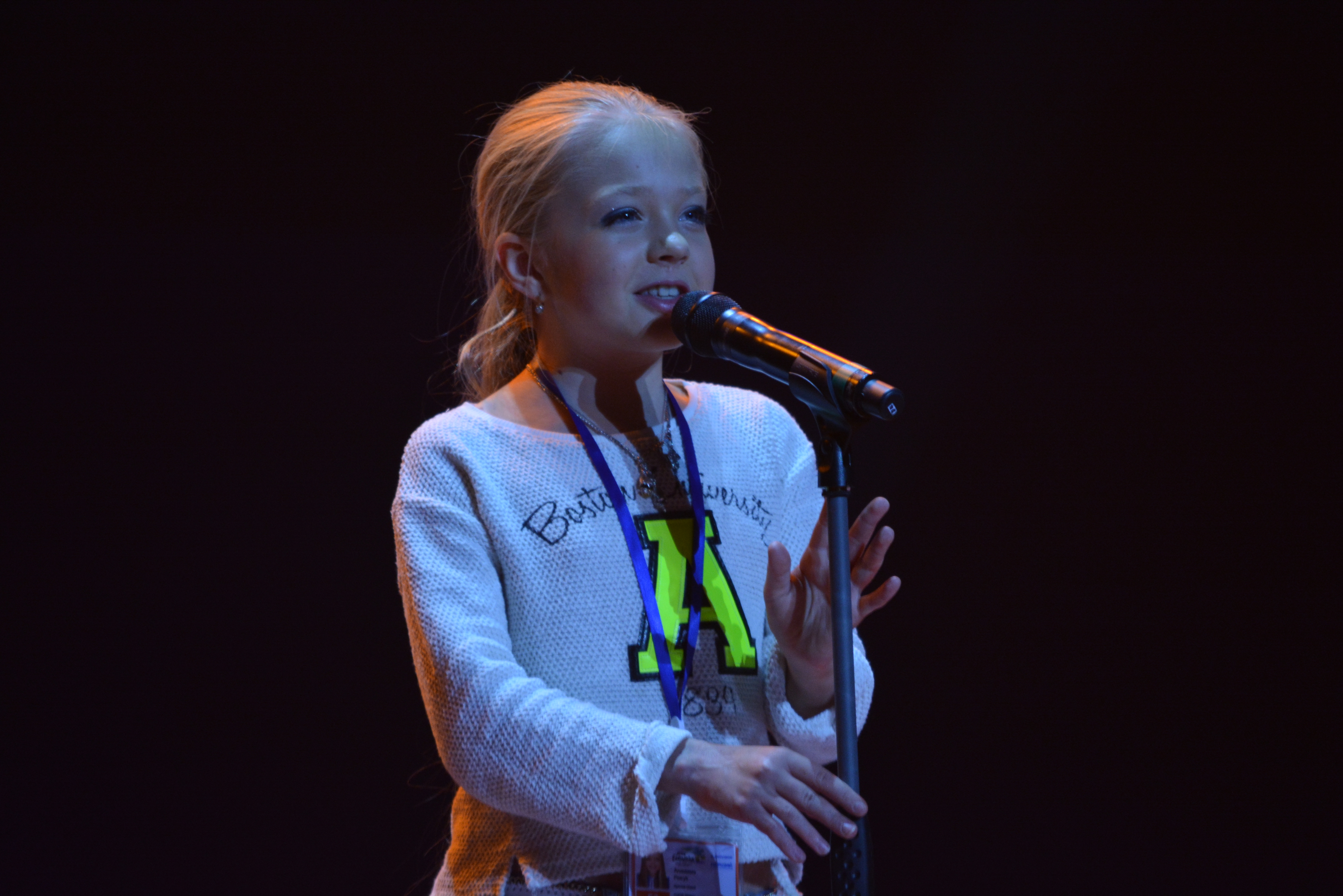
Petryk in 2013 in Kyiv

In 2009, at the age of 7, Anastasiya Petryk appeared on the second season of Ukraine's Got Talent with her older sister Viktoria "Vika" Petryk, who represented Ukraine in the Junior Eurovision Song Contest 2008, finishing in second place.

Although Anastasiya was only supporting her sister backstage, the judges invited her to sing a song with her sister Victoria. After singing "I Love Rock 'n' Roll", they were invited to take part in the show together, reaching the semi-finals. That year Anastasiya also won the first prize in the "Moloda Halychyna" and second prize in the "Black Sea Games 2009".

In 2010, at the International Popular Music competition "New Wave Junior 2010" held in Artek, Ukraine, Anastasiya won the first prize in the younger age group (8 to 12 years old). Her sister Viktoria won in the older age group.

In 2012, Petryk won the Junior Eurovision Song Contest 2012 with the song "Nebo". She set new records from both largest winning margin in Junior Eurovision with 138 points (35 points ahead of 2nd place) and largest percentage of 12-point scores, being awarded 12 points by 8 out of 12 of the voting countries (excluding Ukraine itself).

In spring 2022, following the Russian invasion of Ukraine, Petryk moved to Philadelphia.

== Discography ==
=== Singles ===
Year	Title	English translation	Album
2010	"Oh! Darling"	—	Nastya Petryk
2010	"I Love Rock 'n' Roll"	—	Nastya Petryk
2011	"When You Believe" (ft. Viktoria Petryk)	—	Nastya Petryk
2012	"Nebo" (Небо)	Sky	Nastya Petryk
2013	"Peremoha" (Перемога)	Victory	Non-album single(s)
2013	"Winner"	—	Non-album single(s)

== See also ==
- Ukraine in the Junior Eurovision Song Contest
- Junior Eurovision Song Contest 2012

== Notes ==
Awards and achievements
Preceded by Kristall with "Evropa"	Ukraine in the Junior Eurovision Song Contest; 2012	Succeeded by Sofia Tarasova with "We Are One"
Preceded by (Georgia (country)) Candy with "Candy Music"	Winner of the Junior Eurovision Song Contest; 2012	Succeeded by (Malta) Gaia Cauchi with "The Start"
