= Junior Eurovision Song Contest 2012 =

International song competition for youth

- Break the Ice

Date and venue
- Final: 1 December 2012
- Venue: Heineken Music Hall; Amsterdam, Netherlands

Organisation
- Organiser: European Broadcasting Union (EBU)
- Executive supervisor: Sietse Bakker

Production
- Host broadcaster: Algemene Vereniging Radio Omroep (AVRO)
- Director: David Grifhorst
- Executive producer: Ronald Kok
- Presenters: Ewout Genemans; Kim-Lian van der Meij

Participants
- Number of entries: 12
- Debuting countries: Albania; Azerbaijan; Israel
- Non-returning countries: Bulgaria; Latvia; Lithuania; Macedonia
- Participation map: Competing countries Countries that participated in the past but not in 2012

Vote
- Voting system: Each country awards 12, 10, 8–1 points to their 10 favourite songs.
- Winning song: Ukraine "Nebo"

The Junior Eurovision Song Contest 2012 was the tenth edition of the Junior Eurovision Song Contest, held on 1 December 2012 at the Heineken Music Hall in Amsterdam, Netherlands, and presented by Ewout Genemans and Kim-Lian van der Meij. It was organised by the European Broadcasting Union (EBU) and host broadcaster Algemene Vereniging Radio Omroep (AVRO). For the second time the contest was hosted in the Netherlands, after hosting the contest in 2007 in Rotterdam.

Broadcasters from twelve countries participated, the smallest number of countries ever participating in a single edition of the contest. Albania, Azerbaijan, and Israel made their debuts at the Junior Eurovision Song Contest. Whilst nine countries from the previous edition continued their participation in the contest, four countries withdrew: Lithuania, Bulgaria, Latvia and Macedonia.

The contest was won by Ukraine with the song "Nebo" by Anastasiya Petryk. Georgia and Armenia finished in second and third place, respectively. This was Ukraine's first Junior Eurovision victory and second Eurovision victory after Ruslana won the Eurovision Song Contest 2004. Ukraine's winning margin of 35 points was also a record.

== Location ==
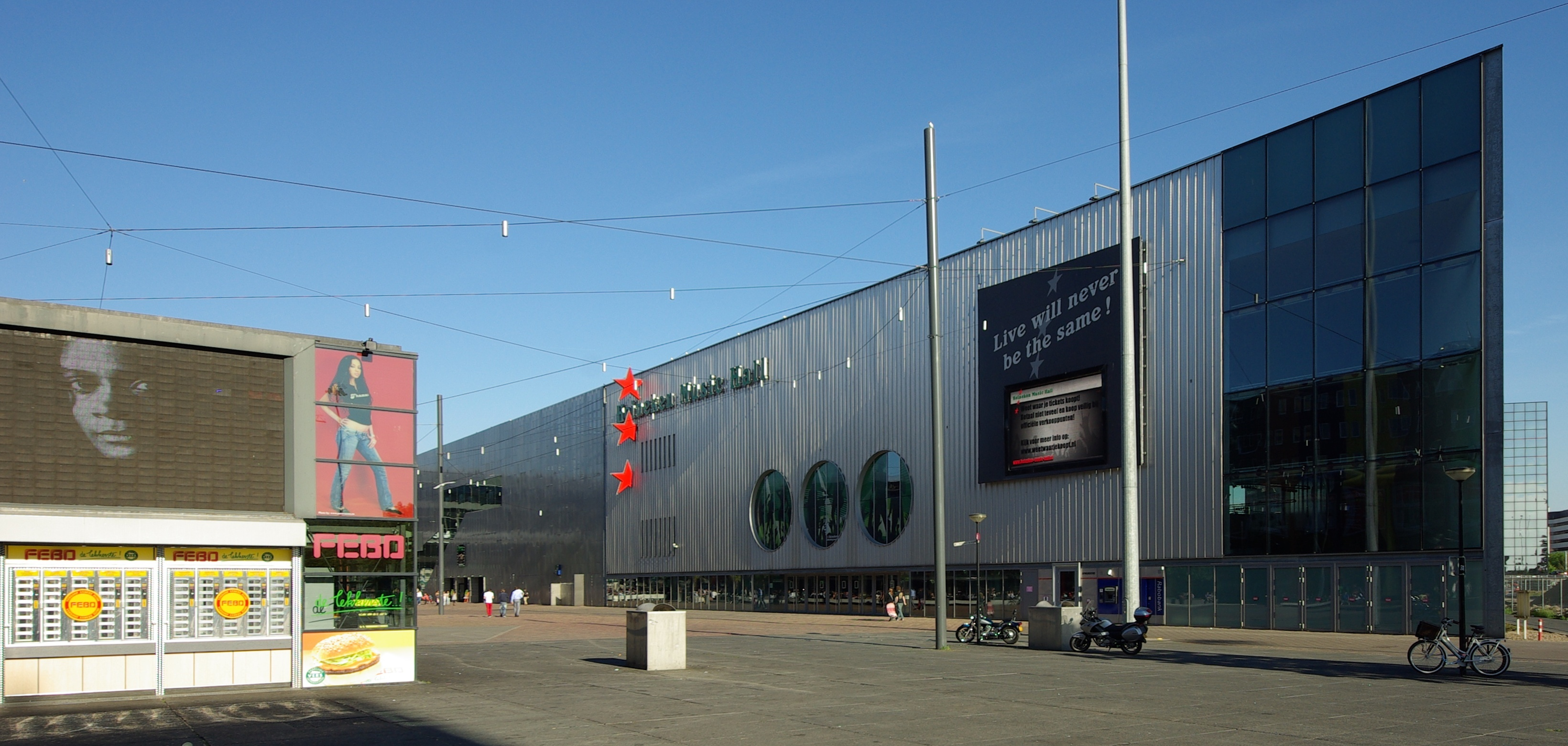
Heineken Music Hall in Amsterdam, venue for the 2012 contest.

The European Broadcasting Union (EBU) invited broadcasters to bid for the rights to host the contest. At the meeting of heads of delegations on 11 October 2011 in Yerevan, the EBU announced that the Dutch broadcaster AVRO had won the right to host next year's event.

On 27 February 2012, it was announced that the tenth edition of the contest would take place on 1 December and be held at the Heineken Music Hall (or commonly abbreviated as HMH) in Amsterdam. The Heineken Music Hall was specially designed for music shows, several artists like Madonna and Kylie Minogue made shows at the venue. Furthermore, it is often used by the Dutch Entertainment Company Q-dance for the Event-Series X-Qlusive taking place several times a year. The big hall (also called Black Box) has been used for concerts and boasts a capacity of 5,500 and is 3000 m^{2}. After parties are given in a smaller hall, with a capacity of 700.

== Participants ==
Cover art of the official album

On 1 September 2012, it was confirmed that twelve countries would be taking part in the contest. This was the lowest number of entries so far. Debuting countries were Albania, Azerbaijan and Israel. Latvia and Lithuania withdrew after competing since 2010, while Bulgaria and Macedonia withdrew after competing in the 2011 edition. With Macedonia withdrawing, this was the first (and so far only) time since the contest inception that no country of the former Yugoslavia participated in the Junior Eurovision Song Contest.

Prior to the event, a digital compilation album featuring all the songs from the 2012 contest, along with karaoke versions, was put together by the European Broadcasting Union and released by Universal Music Group in November 2012.

Participants of the Junior Eurovision Song Contest 2012
Country	Broadcaster	Artist	Song	Language	Songwriter(s)
Albania	RTSH	Igzidora Gjeta	"Kam një këngë vetëm për ju"	Albanian	Igzidora Gjeta; Jorgo Papingji; Xhavit Ujkani
Armenia	AMPTV	Compass Band	"Sweetie Baby"	Armenian, English	David Paronikyan
Azerbaijan	İTV	Omar and Suada	"Girls and Boys (Dünya Sənindir)"	Azerbaijani, English	Jessica Appla; Zahra Badalbeyli; Simon Ellis
Belarus	BTRC	Egor Zheshko	"A more-more" (А море-море)	Russian	Valery Shmat; Egor Zheshko
Belgium	VRT	Fabian	"Abracadabra"	Dutch	Stefaan Fernande; Fabian Feyaerts; Jeroen Swinnen
Georgia	GPB	Funkids	"Funky Lemonade"	Georgian, English	The Funkids; Giga Kukhianidze; Nana Tsintsadze
Israel	IBA	Kids.il	"Let the Music Win"	Hebrew, English, French, Russian	Ohad Hitman; Kids.il
Moldova	TRM	Denis Midone	"Toate vor fi"	Romanian, English	Radmila Paraschiv; Marian Stircea
Netherlands	AVRO	Femke	"Tik Tak Tik"	Dutch	Femke; Anne Kees Meines; Tjeerd Oosterhuis
Russia	VGTRK	Lerika	"Sensation"	Russian, English	Valeriya "Lerika" Engalycheva
Sweden	SVT	Lova Sönnerbo	"Mitt mod"	Swedish	Lydia Westin Malm; Lova Sönnerbo; Janni Steffner
Ukraine	NTU	Anastasiya Petryk	"Nebo" (Небо)	Ukrainian, English	Anastasiya Petryk

=== Returning artists ===
The Russian representative, Lerika, had participated in the Junior Eurovision Song Contest before; she represented Moldova in 2011, finishing in 6th place with the song "No, No". This was the second case in the competition to feature a returning artist from previous editions after Katya Ryabova (Russia 2009 and 2011).

== Format ==
=== Presenters ===
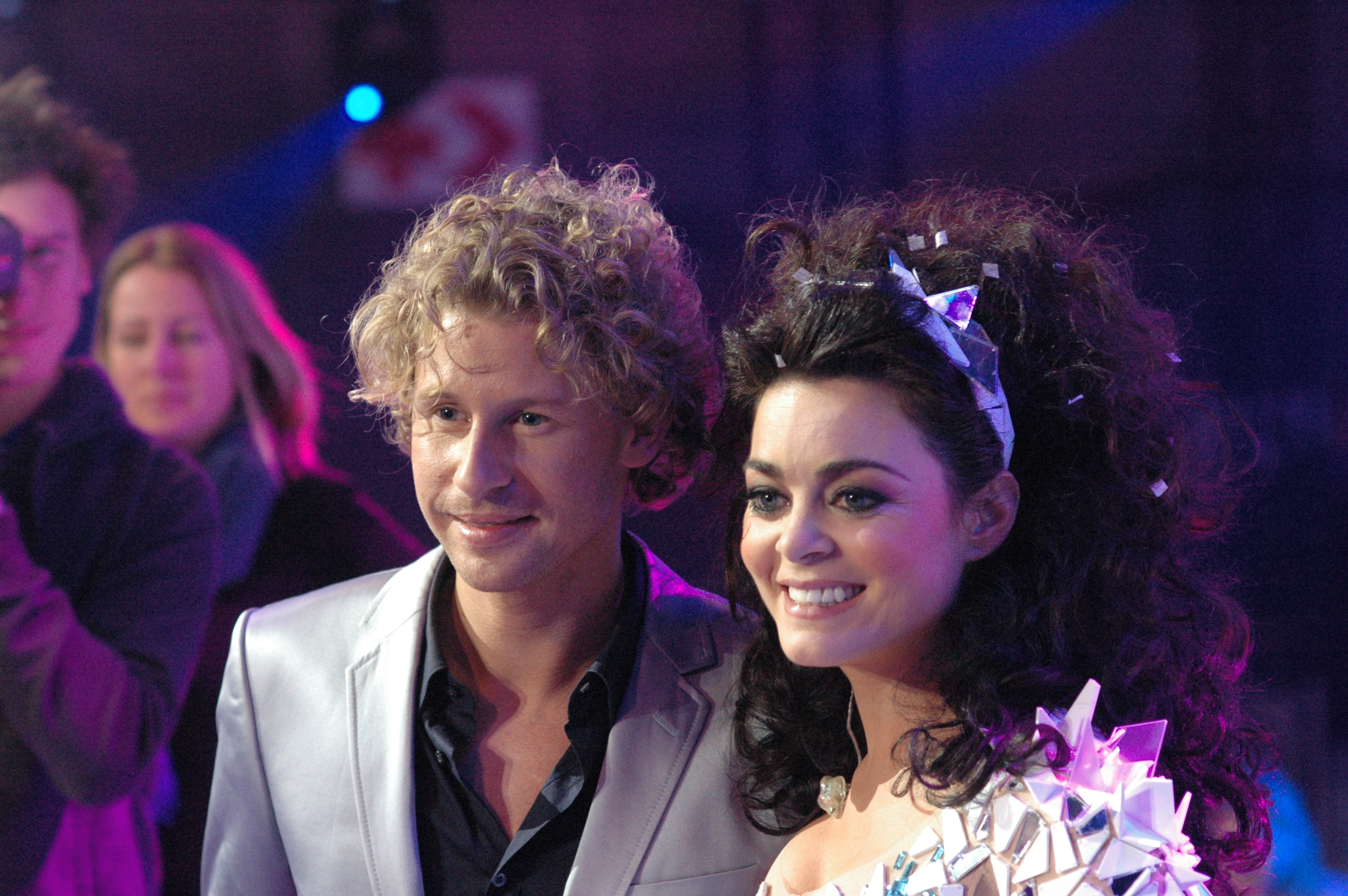
Ewout Genemans and Kim-Lian van der Meij at the contest.

In January 2012, it was announced that Ewout Genemans alongside Junior Eurovision Song Contest 2007 co-host Kim-Lian van der Meij would present the contest later in the year. Genemans had been involved with the contest for the past two years, having hosted the Dutch national selection for the contest, Junior Songfestival in 2010 and 2011. In December 2011, Genemans signed a 2-year exclusivity deal with the host broadcaster to present shows only on their station. Dutch entertainer and singer Kim Lian reprised her role as host again, after hosting the contest from the Ahoy Arena in 2007 alongside Sipke Jan Bousema.

=== Logo and graphic design ===
The architect was Frits van Dongen. The motto for the contest was announced on 6 September 2012 as "Break The Ice". Tickets for the contest went on sale from 10 September 2012.

== Contest overview ==
The event took place on 1 December 2012 at 20:15 CET. Twelve countries participated, with the running order published on 15 October 2012. All the countries competing were eligible to vote with the jury and televote, as well as a Kids Jury, eligible to vote. Ukraine won with 138 points, with Georgia and Armenia completing the top three. Moldova, Azerbaijan and Albania occupied the bottom three positions.

The show was opened with the song "Euphoria" from Loreen performed by 2011 Dutch representative Rachel Traets. The interval included Kim-Lian van der Meij, who specially written "Break the Ice" as the theme song for this contest, performed on stage whilst all the participants sang "We Can Be Heroes" to promote children's rights worldwide in cooperation with the Dutch charity, KidsRights Foundation and the 2009 winner Ralf Mackenbach performed also with his winning song "Click Clack".

R/O	Country	Artist	Song	Points	Place
1	Belarus	Egor Zheshko	"A more-more"	56	9
2	Sweden	Lova Sönnerbo	"Mitt mod"	70	6
3	Azerbaijan	Omar and Suada	"Girls and Boys (Dünya Sənindir)"	49	11
4	Belgium	Fabian	"Abracadabra"	72	5
5	Russia	Lerika	"Sensation"	88	4
6	Israel	Kids.il	"Let the Music Win"	68	8
7	Albania	Igzidora Gjeta	"Kam një këngë vetëm për ju"	35	12
8	Armenia	Compass Band	"Sweetie Baby"	98	3
9	Ukraine	Anastasiya Petryk	"Nebo"	138	1
10	Georgia	Funkids	"Funky Lemonade"	103	2
11	Moldova	Denis Midone	"Toate vor fi"	52	10
12	Netherlands	Femke	"Tik Tak Tik"	69	7

=== Spokespersons ===
The order in which votes were cast during the 2012 contest along with the spokesperson who was responsible for announcing the votes for their respective country.

1. Kids Jury – Ralf Mackenbach
2. Belarus – Maria Drozdova
3. Sweden – Leya Gullström
4. Azerbaijan – Leila Hajili
5. Belgium – Femke Verschueren
6. Russia – Valentin Sadiki
7. Israel – Maayan Aloni
8. Albania – Keida Dervishi
9. Armenia – Michael Varosyan
10. Ukraine – Kristall
11. Moldova – Felcia Genunchi
12. Netherlands – Lidewei Loot
13. Georgia – Candy

== Detailed voting results ==
Due to technical issues, Georgia was the final country to cast its votes.

Detailed voting results
		Total score	Kids Jury	Belarus	Sweden	Azerbaijan	Belgium	Russia	Israel	Albania	Armenia	Ukraine	Moldova	Netherlands	Georgia
Contestants	Belarus	56	1		1	7	2	4	1	2	7	10	2		7
Contestants	Sweden	70	6	7		1	5	5	7	12	2	2	7	4	
Contestants	Azerbaijan	49	2	2	3		1	3		10		5		3	8
Contestants	Belgium	72	3	3	7	3		7	6	7	5	1	6	8	4
Contestants	Russia	88	8	10	8	2	8		4		8	6	10	6	6
Contestants	Israel	68	4	5	4	5	4	8		1	6	8	1	7	3
Contestants	Albania	35				12			3		1		4	2	1
Contestants	Armenia	98	5	8	6		7	10	10	3		12	3	10	12
Contestants	Ukraine	138	10	12	12	4	12	12	12	6	12		12	12	10
Contestants	Georgia	103	12	6	10	8	6	6	8	5	10	7	8	5	
Contestants	Moldova	52		4	2	10	3	2	5	4	3	4		1	2
Contestants	Netherlands	69	7	1	5	6	10	1	2	8	4	3	5		5

=== 12 points ===
Below is a summary of all 12 points received. All countries were given 12 points at the start of voting to ensure that no country finished with nul points.

N.	Contestant	Nation(s) giving 12 points
8	Ukraine	Armenia, Belarus, Belgium, Israel, Moldova, Netherlands, Russia, Sweden
2	Armenia	Georgia, Ukraine
1	Albania	Azerbaijan
1	Georgia	Kids Jury
1	Sweden	Albania

== Other countries ==
- Bulgaria – On 11 June 2012, Bulgarian National Television (BNT) confirmed that Bulgaria would not be taking part in the 2012 contest.
- Cyprus – The Cyprus Broadcasting Corporation (CyBC) confirmed to esckaz.com in Baku that Cyprus would not be returning to the Junior Eurovision Song Contest in 2012.
- Finland – In mid June 2012, Yleisradio (Yle) confirmed to esckaz.com that they would not be debuting at the 2012 contest. They did however say they were open to taking part in the future.
- Italy – In July 2011, the EBU confirmed that Italian broadcaster Radiotelevisione italiana (RAI) were interested in making a debut at the 2011 contest. But a delay in negotiations meant that this would not be the case, and that Italy would certainly secure a place in 2012, if their desire to participate was still on the agenda.
- Latvia – On 27 June 2012, Latvijas Televīzija (LTV) confirmed to esckaz.com that Latvia would not be taking part in the 2012 contest. The reason for withdrawal was not given, however it's believed that financial issues caused the withdrawal.
- Lithuania – On 27 June 2012, Lithuanian National Radio and Television (LRT) confirmed to esckaz.com that Lithuania would not be taking part in 2012 contest. The Lithuanian Head of Delegation said, the withdrawal was due to the expense of broadcasting the 2012 Summer Olympics and 2012 UEFA European Football Championship leaving no budget for participation in 2012.
- Macedonia – On 13 July 2012, Macedonian Radio-Television (MKRTV) confirmed to esckaz.com that they would not be taking part in the 2012 contest. They said this was due to issues with the way voting is held and the lack of budget for the contest.
- Norway – In early June 2012, Norsk rikskringkasting (NRK) confirmed that Norway would not return to the contest, this is due to a rule change that the EBU made in 2006, that allowed professional singers to take part.
- Portugal – In early June 2012, Rádio e Televisão de Portugal (RTP) were approached by the EBU to take part in the 2012 contest. RTP declined due to financial difficulties.
- San Marino – San Marino RTV had originally planned to debut in the 2011 contest, but later withdrew their application in order to concentrate on their preparation for the Eurovision Song Contest 2012 instead. San Marino RTV has announced on 22 August 2012 that they would not take part in 2012 contest.
- Serbia – When Serbia withdrew from the 2011 contest, the head of delegation said that a one-year break would be okay, for financial reasons and that hopefully they would in 2012, in order to "not disappoint the Serbian kids". However, the country didn't participate.
- Spain – Website esckaz.com asked Spanish broadcaster Televisión Española (TVE) about their participation in future editions. TVE was not able to give an affirmative or negative response on their participation in 2012.

== Broadcasts ==
Each national broadcaster sent a commentator to the contest, in order to provide coverage of the contest in their own native language. Details of the commentators and the broadcasting station for which they represented are also included in the table below.

Broadcasters and commentators in participating countries
Country	Broadcaster(s)	Commentator(s)	Ref.
Albania	RTVSH	Andri Xhahu	
Armenia	Armenia 1	Gohar Gasparyan	
Azerbaijan	Ictimai TV	Konul Arifkizi	
Belarus	Belarus 1	Pavel Lazorik	
Belgium	Eén	Astrid Demeure and Tom De Cock	
Georgia	GPB	Temo Kvirkvelia	
Israel	IBA	No commentator	
Moldova	TRM	Rusalina Rusu	
Netherlands	Nederland 1	Marcel Kuijer	
Russia	Russia-1	Olga Shelest	
Sweden	SVT2	Edward af Sillen and Ylva Hällen	
Ukraine	NTU	Timur Miroshnychenko	

== See also ==
- ABU Radio Song Festival 2012
- ABU TV Song Festival 2012
- Eurovision Song Contest 2012
- Eurovision Young Musicians 2012
