= Laura Omloop =

Belgian pop singer (born 1999)

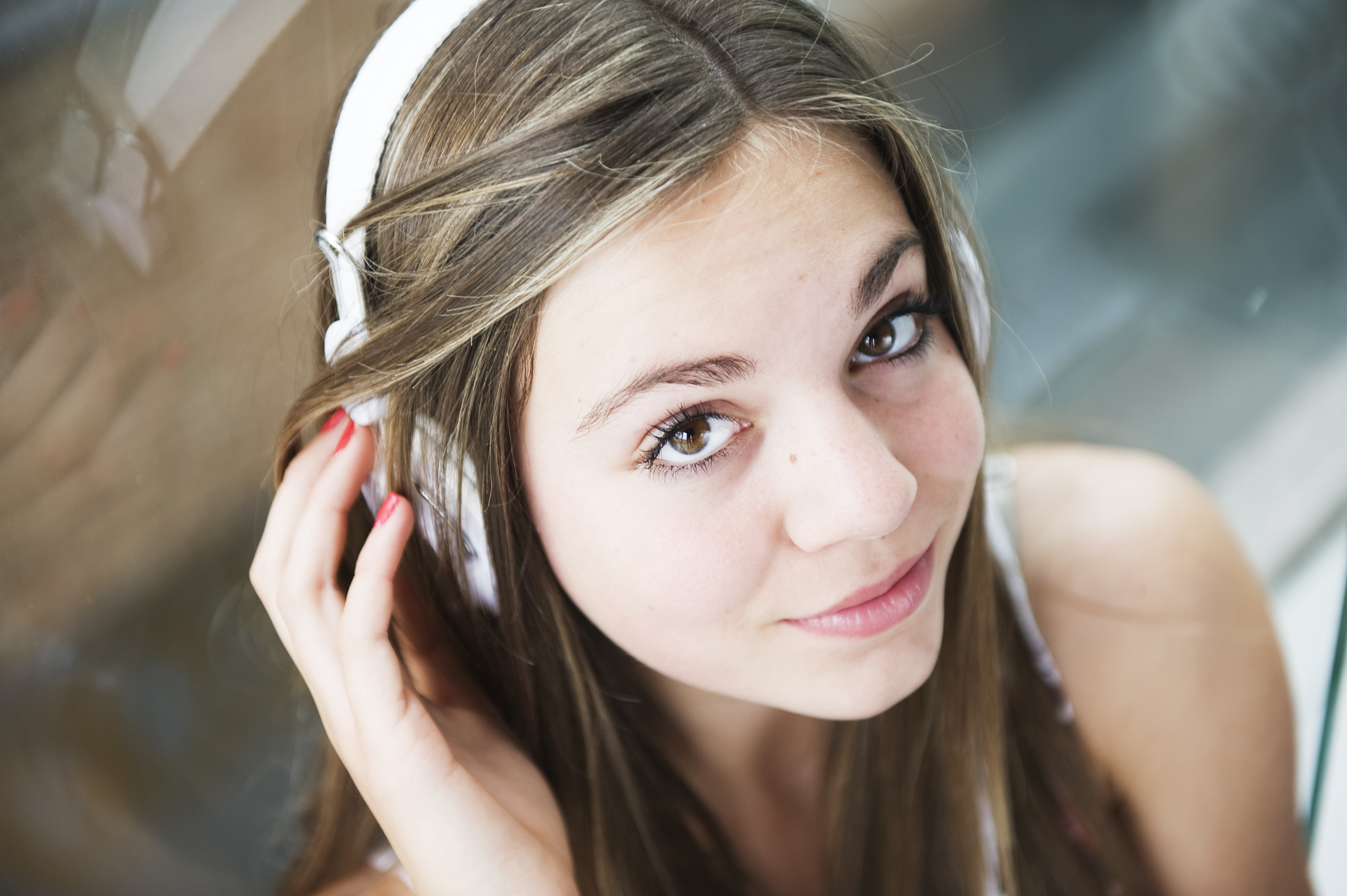
- Laura Omloop (2014)

Background information
- Also known as: Laura
- Born: Laura Omloop; 18 May 1999 (age 27)
- Origin: Berlaar, Belgium
- Genres: Dance-pop, bubblegum pop, Europop
- Occupation: Singer-songwriter
- Instruments: Vocals, piano, guitar
- Years active: 2009–present

Laura Omloop (born 18 May 1999) is a Belgian pop singer who represented her country in the Junior Eurovision Song Contest 2009 in Kyiv, Ukraine, finishing in fourth place. Omloop sang the song "Zo verliefd", which contains yodeling. This was Belgium's best result in the Junior Eurovision Song Contest.

In June 2010, Omloop released the single, "Stapelgek op jou", along with an album titled Verliefd.

== Discography ==
=== Singles ===
- "Zo verliefd" (2009)
- "Stapelgek op jou" (2010)
- "Zo zonder jou" (2015)

=== Albums ===
- Verliefd (2010)
- Wereld vol kleuren (2011)
- Klaar voor! (2012)
- Meer (2014)

Awards and achievements
Preceded by Oliver with "Shut Up"	Belgium in the Junior Eurovision Song Contest; 2009	Succeeded by Jill and Lauren with "Get Up"
