= Egor Zheshko =

Belarusian singer (born 1999)

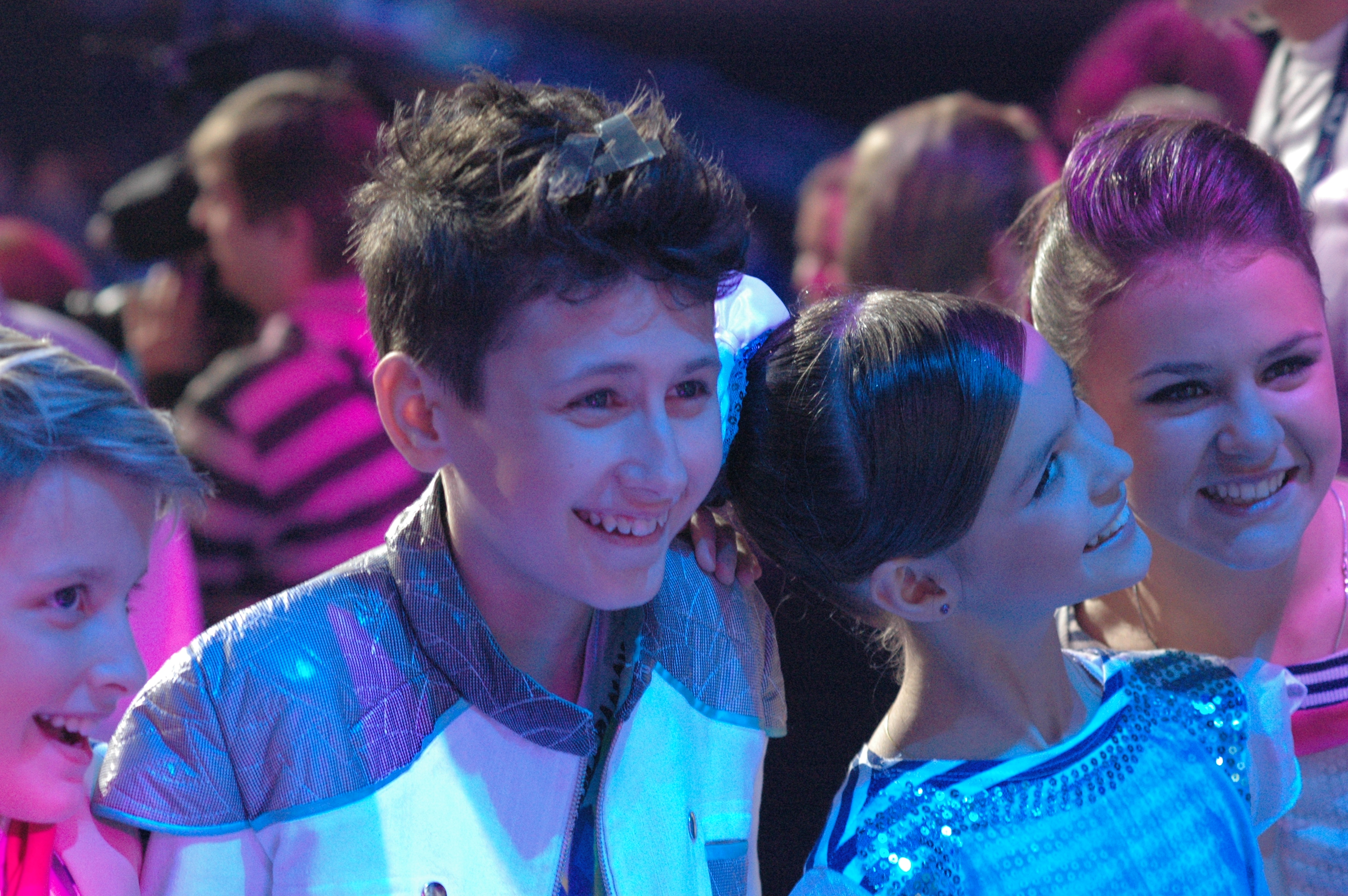
Egor Zheshko at the contest

Egor Zheshko (Belarusian: Ягор Жэшка; born 24 December 1999) is a Belarusian singer. On 1 December 2012, Zheshko represented Belarus at the Junior Eurovision Song Contest 2012 with his song "Ah More, More" (O Sea, Sea).

== Singles ==
Year	Title	English Translation	Album
2011	"Solnechniy Ostrov"	"Sunny island"	Non-album singles
2012	"Krik v Zefir"	Creek in ether	Non-album singles
2012	"Ah More, More"	Oh sea, sea	Non-album singles

Awards and achievements
Preceded by Lidiya Zablotskaya with Angely dobra	Belarus in the Junior Eurovision Song Contest; 2012	Succeeded by Ilya Volkov with Poy so Mnoy
