= Viktoria Petryk =

Ukrainian singer and songwriter (born 1997)

Viktoria Petryk Вікторія Петрик
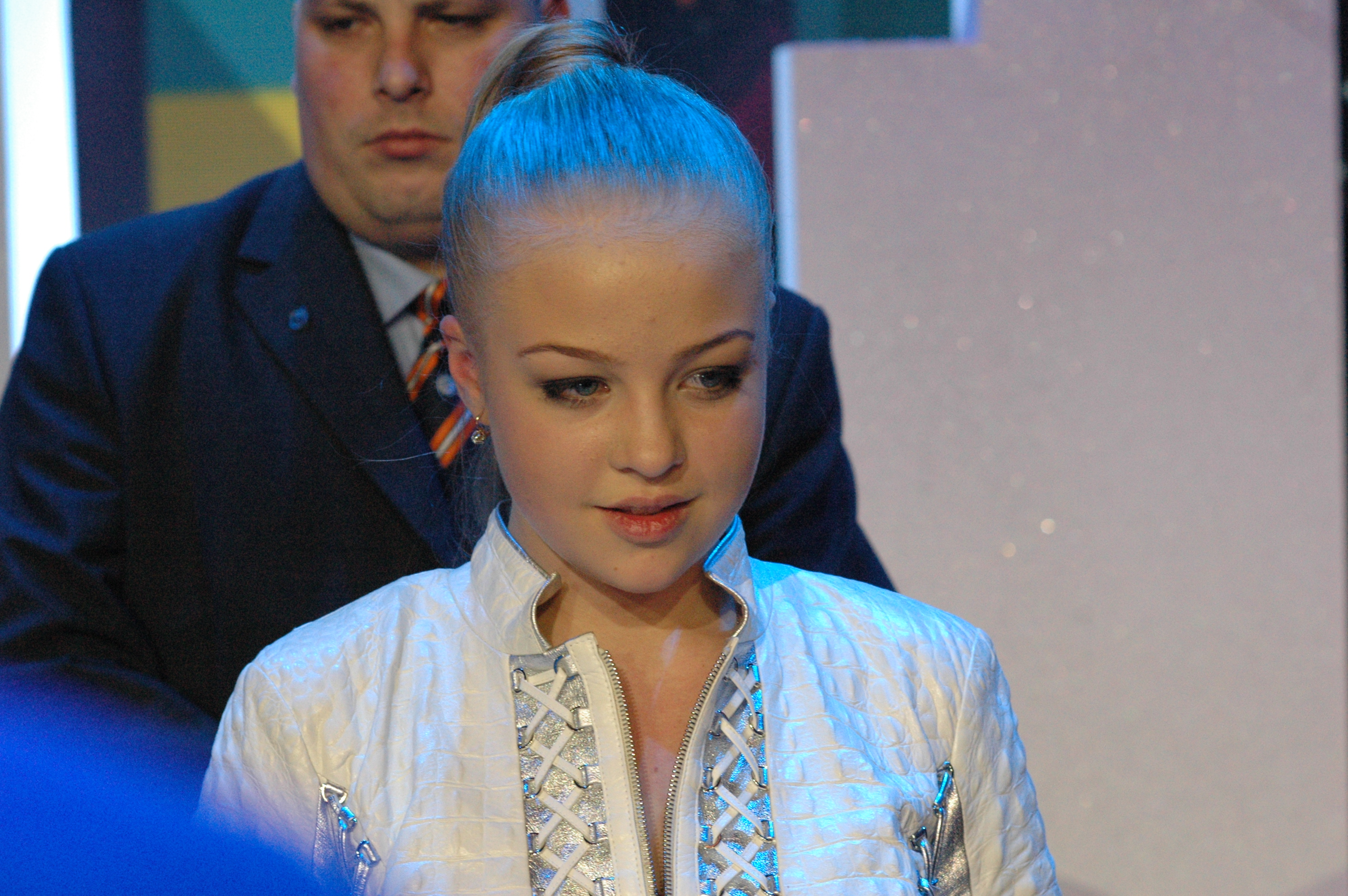
- Viktoria in 2012

Background information
- Born: Viktoria Ihorivna Petryk; 21 May 1997 (age 29); Nerubaiske, Odesa Oblast, Ukraine
- Genres: Pop
- Occupation: Singer
- Instrument: Vocals
- Years active: 2008–present
- Website: http://petryksisters.com/

Viktoria Ihorivna "Vika" Petryk (Ukrainian: Вікто́рія Іго́рівна "Віка" Пе́трик; born 21 May 1997) is a Ukrainian singer and songwriter who represented Ukraine at the Junior Eurovision Song Contest 2008, held in Limassol, Cyprus, with the song "Matrosy" ("Sailors"). She finished in second place.

She has been singing since she was four years old. Petryk was a finalist in the Ukrainian national selection to find the Ukrainian representative in the Eurovision Song Contest 2014 and came second in the national final with her song "Love Is Lord" behind only Mariya Yaremchuk. She participated in the Ukrainian national selection to find the Ukrainian representative in the Eurovision Song Contest 2016 with the song "Overload", coming 7th in the semifinal.

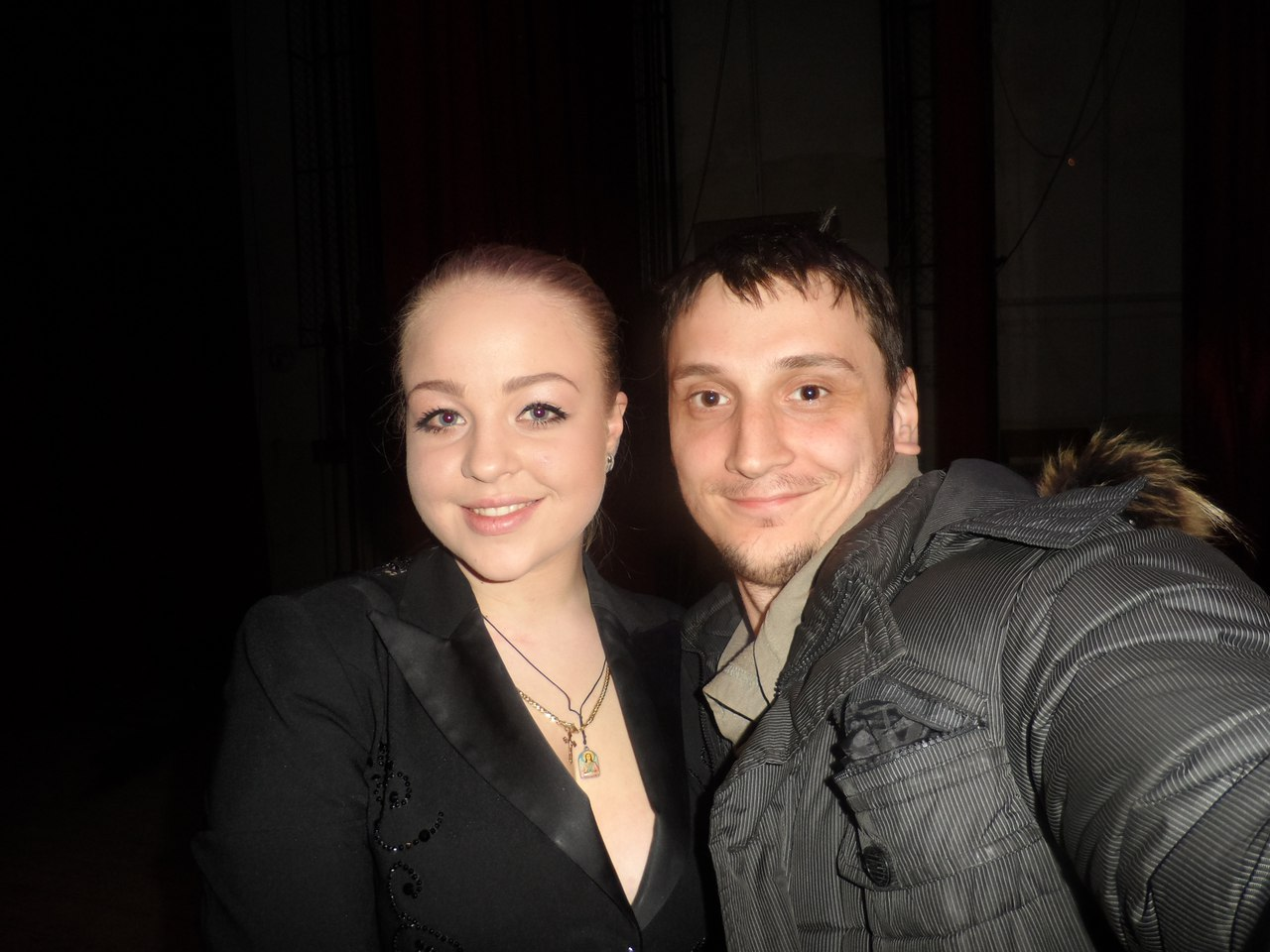
Petryk (left) in 2016

In 2012, her younger sister, Anastasiya won that year's Junior Eurovision Song Contest for Ukraine with the song "Nebo".

== Life and work ==
Viktoria Petryk was born on 21 May 1997 in the village of Nerubaiske, Odesa, Ukraine. She represented Ukraine at the Junior Eurovision Song Contest 2008, held in Limassol, Cyprus, with the song "Matrosy" ("Sailors"), finishing in second place. Petryk has entered many children’s singing competitions and won many awards and diplomas, the first being a Second Rank Diploma at the International Venok Chornomorya Art Festival in Odesa.

In 2010, at age 13, she was a contestant on the TV show Ukraine’s Got Talent 2 (Ukrayina maye talant) where she made it to the semi-final stage singing with her eight-year-old sister, Anastasiya Petryk. She also won the 13–15 years age group at the "New Wave Junior" international competition, where her sister, Anastasiya, won the younger 8-12 age group.

In 2014 Petryk competed in the Latvian festival "New Wave".

== Marriage ==
She married in December 2016 while she was pregnant with her son David (born March 2017).

== See also ==
- Ukraine in the Junior Eurovision Song Contest
- Junior Eurovision Song Contest 2008
- Ukraine in the Eurovision Song Contest 2014

Awards and achievements
Preceded by Ilona Halytska with "Urok hlamuru"	Ukraine in the Junior Eurovision Song Contest; 2008	Succeeded by Andranik Alexanyan with "Try topoli, try surmy"
