= Albania in the Junior Eurovision Song Contest =

- Junior Eurovision Song Contest
- Participating broadcaster: Radio Televizioni Shqiptar (RTSH)

Participation summary
- Appearances: 12
- First appearance: 2012
- Highest placement: 5th: 2015
- Participation history: 2012; 2013; 2014; 2015; 2016; 2017; 2018; 2019; 2020; 2021; 2022; 2023; 2024; 2025; 2026
- For the most recent participation see Albania in the Junior Eurovision Song Contest 2026

Albania has been represented at the Junior Eurovision Song Contest since 2012. The Albanian participating broadcaster in the contest is Radio Televizioni Shqiptar (RTSH).

Its first entry was in 2012 with the song "Kam një këngë vetëm për ju" by Igzidora Gjeta, which achieved a score of thirty-five points, finishing in twelfth place out of twelve participating entries. RTSH was subsequently absent in 2013 and 2014. It returned in 2015, with "Dambaje" by Mishela Rapo, achieving ninety-three points and finishing in fifth place out of seventeen participants; this remains the country's best score to date. RTSH subsequently competed every year until 2020, when it had its first absence in six years after withdrawing due to the COVID-19 pandemic. However, on 18 August 2021, RTSH announced that they would return to the contest in 2021, and has participated in every contest since.

== History ==
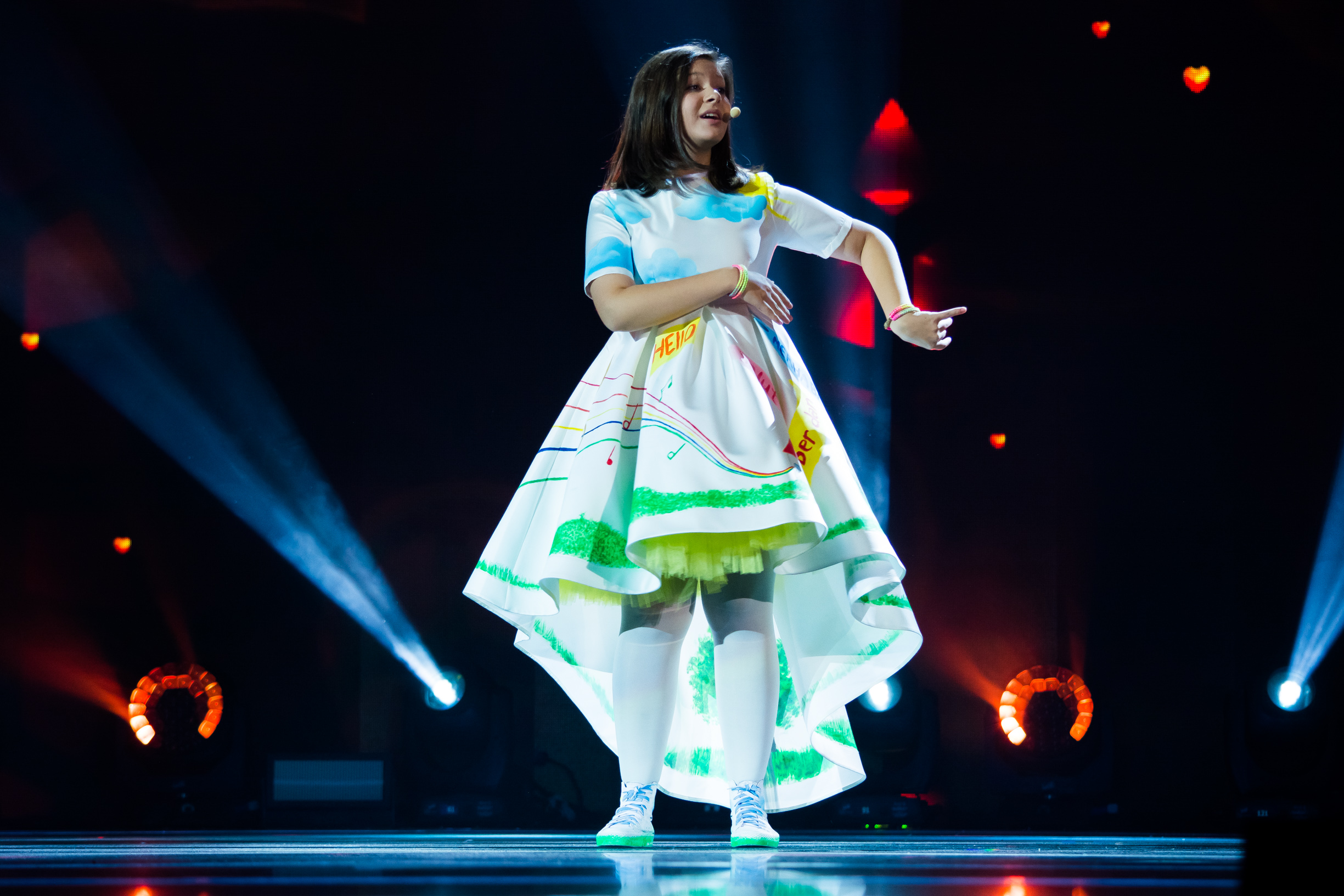
Mishela Rapo at the Junior Eurovision Song Contest 2015, in Sofia, Bulgaria

In 2005, Albanian broadcaster Radio Televizioni Shqiptar (RTSH) broadcast that year's contest in Hasselt. On 14 August 2012, RTSH announced that they would be making their Junior Eurovision debut at the 2012 contest in Amsterdam, Netherlands on 1 December 2012. The mechanism used at the time in order to select their representative was a national pre-selection show entitled Junior Fest Albania 2012. It consisted of a televised production in which the participants voted for each other, giving one, two, or three points to each other with no jury or public vote. Child-singer, Igzidora Gjeta, was the first participant to represent Albania with the song "Kam një këngë vetëm për ju", which finished in twelfth place achieving a score of thirty-five points. This was Albania's worst result in their contest history.

On 27 September 2013, RTSH announced that their withdrawal from the 2013 contest, with the EBU stating that the withdrawal was due to financial and organisational issues. Albania continued to be absent from the contest in 2014, and it was not until 13 March 2015 that RTSH announced their return to the competition. The national selection show which was organised in order to select the 2015 participant was entitled Festivali i Këngës për Femije, and was won by Mishela Rapo with the song "Dambaje". At the Junior Eurovision Song Contest 2015, Rapo finished in fifth place, achieving ninety-three points and their best result to date.

On 1 June 2016, Klesta Qehaja won the Festivali i Këngës për Femije with the song "Besoj", earning the right to represent Albania at the Junior Eurovision Song Contest 2016 in Valletta. She received thirty-eight points, therefore finishing thirteenth out of seventeen participating countries. Albania went on to appear at every Junior Eurovision Song Contest until 2020.

Following a brief withdrawal from the 2020 contest due to the COVID-19 pandemic, RTSH returned to competing in 2021, with Anna Gjebrea placing fourteenth out of nineteen with "Stand by You". On 16 July 2022, RTSH confirmed it would participate in the Junior Eurovision Song Contest 2022 in Yerevan, Armenia. The broadcaster organised Junior Fest to select the Albanian entry for the fifth time, resulting in the selection of Kejtlin Gjata with the song "Pakëz diell". Gjata placed twelfth at the contest with 94 points. On 5 July 2023, RTSH confirmed that the Albanian representative for the 2023 contest in Nice, France would be chosen via the national selection competition Junior Fest 2023. Bojken Lako was named as the creative director for the competition, which was to undergo changes as compared to previous years. Viola Gjyzeli was ultimately selected to be the Albanian representative with the song "Bota ime". At the contest, Albania achieved its second best result in history, placing eighth overall with 115 points and fifth with the professional juries. This also marked the first Albanian entry in the Junior Eurovision Song Contest to receive more than 100 points. In the 2024 contest, Albania was represented by Nikol Çabeli with her song “Vallëzoj". Çabeli secured another top 10 result for Albania, finishing in seventh position with 126 points. This marked Albania's second highest placing in the contest and became the second entry to surpass 100 points for the country. This record was surpassed further at the 2025 contest, in which Kroni Pula placed sixth with 145 points.

== Participation overview ==
Table key
◁	Last place
†	Upcoming event

Year	Artist	Song	Language	Place	Points
2012	Igzidora Gjeta	"Kam një këngë vetëm për ju"	Albanian	12 ◁	35
2015	Mishela Rapo	"Dambaje"	Albanian, English	5	93
2016	Klesta Qehaja	"Besoj"	Albanian, English	13	38
2017	Ana Kodra	"Don't Touch My Tree (Mos ma prekni pemën)"	Albanian, English	13	67
2018	Efi Gjika	"Barbie"	Albanian, English	17	44
2019	Isea Çili	"Mikja ime fëmijëri"	Albanian	17	36
2021	Anna Gjebrea	"Stand by You"	Albanian, English	14	84
2022	Kejtlin Gjata	"Pakëz diell"	Albanian	12	94
2023	Viola Gjyzeli	"Bota ime"	Albanian	8	115
2024	Nikol Çabeli	"Vallëzoj"	Albanian	7	126
2025	Kroni Pula	"Fruta perime"	Albanian	6	145
2026	Eslin Kurti	"Kërce me mua"	Albanian	15	62
2027	Confirmed intention to participate †				

== Commentators and spokespersons ==
The contests are broadcast online worldwide through the official Junior Eurovision Song Contest website junioreurovision.tv and YouTube. In 2015, the online broadcasts featured commentary in English by junioreurovision.tv editor Luke Fisher and 2011 Bulgarian Junior Eurovision Song Contest entrant Ivan Ivanov. The Albanian broadcaster, RTSH, sent their own commentator to each contest in order to provide commentary in the Albanian language. Spokespersons were also chosen by the national broadcaster in order to announce the awarding points from Albania. The table below list the details of each commentator and spokesperson since 2012.

Year	Commentator	Spokesperson	Ref.
2005	Unknown	Did not participate	
2006–2011	No broadcast	Did not participate	N/A
2012	Andri Xhahu	Keida Dervishi	
2013–2014	No broadcast	Did not participate	N/A
2015	Andri Xhahu	Majda Bejzade	
2016	Andri Xhahu	Juna Dizdari	
2017	Andri Xhahu	Sabjana Rizvanu	
2018	Andri Xhahu	Daniil Lazuko	
2019	Andri Xhahu	Efi Gjika	
2020	Unknown (Note: Delayed broadcast in a shortened format on 6 October 2022 at 07:00 CET)	Did not participate	
2021	Andri Xhahu	Alex	
2022	Andri Xhahu	Mariam Gvaladze	
2023	Andri Xhahu	Guilia Moulay	
2024	Andri Xhahu	Anna Gjebrea	
2025	Andri Xhahu	Nikol Çabeli	
2026	Andri Xhahu	Viola Gjyzeli	

== See also ==
- Albania in the Eurovision Song Contest
