= Belgium in the Junior Eurovision Song Contest =

- Junior Eurovision Song Contest
- Participating broadcaster: Radio-télévision belge de la Communauté française (RTBF; 2003–2005); Vlaamse Radio- en Televisieomroeporganisatie (VRT; 2005–2012)

Participation summary
- Appearances: 10
- First appearance: 2003
- Last appearance: 2012
- Highest placement: 4th: 2009
- Host: 2005
- Participation history: 2003; 2004; 2005; 2006; 2007; 2008; 2009; 2010; 2011; 2012; 2013 – 2026
- For the most recent participation see Belgium in the Junior Eurovision Song Contest 2012

Belgium has been represented in every Junior Eurovision Song Contest before withdrawing in 2013. The Belgian participating broadcaster in the contest was Radio-télévision belge de la Communauté française (RTBF) between 2003 and 2005, and Vlaamse Radio- en Televisieomroeporganisatie (VRT) between 2006 and 2012. Their best result was in 2009, when "Zo verliefd" by Laura Omloop came 4th. Their worst result was in 2007, with "Anders" by Trust coming 15th.

== History ==
Belgium are one of the sixteen countries to have made their debut at the inaugural 2003 contest, which took place on 15 November 2003 at the Forum in Copenhagen, Denmark.

=== National selection ===
Two broadcasters were once responsible for the Belgium entry at Junior Eurovision - as for the Eurovision Song Contest, both Flemish broadcaster Vlaamse Radio- en Televisieomroep (VRT) and Walloon broadcaster Radio télévision belge de la communauté française (RTBF) were responsible for organising the Belgian entry for Junior Eurovision. The two broadcasters shared responsibility, with VRT organising one year, and RTBF organising the following year. In 2003 VRT organised the Belgian entry, sending X!NK to Copenhagen with "De vriendschapsband", while in 2004, RTBF organised the Belgian entry, sending the Free Spirits to the contest in Lillehammer with "Accroche-toi".

2005 marked a change to the format, with both broadcasters organising one national final due to the 2005 contest being held in the Belgian city of Hasselt. Each broadcaster chose six songs to compete in one national final, with the final winner representing Belgium at the contest. The winner was Lindsay Daenen with "Mes rêves". 2006 returned to the previous format, with VRT organising the entry. Following this RTBF decided to withdraw from Junior Eurovision due to a lack of interest for the contest in Wallonia and in RTBF. This gave VRT total control of Belgium's Junior Eurovision entry.

Although VRT is a Dutch broadcaster, they have been known to include some French songs in their national finals, for example, in 2008. However, since 2006 all Belgian entries have been in Dutch. In 2010, Belgium sent a duo for the first time since their debut. Belgium was also the first country who confirmed to participate in Junior Eurovision Song Contest 2011 and 2012.

=== Withdrawal ===
On 26 March 2013, VRT announced that Belgium will withdraw from the contest in 2013 in order to launch a new show for young performs in Belgium. However, they held a national final called Wie wordt Junior?, which was won by then 14-year-old Pieter Vreys. On 20 December 2013, Belgium's Flemish TV channel Ketnet announced that they are no longer interested in Junior Eurovision and decided not to make a comeback. On 31 December 2023, VRT stated that it had not yet made a decision as to a return to the contest in 2024, but that it would consider the possibility in the following months. However, Belgium eventually opted against participation in the 2024 contest.

== Participation overview ==
Year	Artist	Song	Language	Place	Points
2003	X!NK	"De vriendschapsband"	Dutch	6	83
2004	Free Spirits	"Accroche-toi"	French	10	37
2005	Lindsay	"Mes rêves"	French	10	63
2006	Thor!	"Een tocht door het donker"	Dutch	7	71
2007	Trust	"Anders"	Dutch	15	19
2008	Oliver	"Shut Up"	Dutch (Note: Even though the song is in Dutch, the title is in English.)	11	45
2009	Laura	"Zo verliefd (Yodelo)"	Dutch	4	113
2010	Jill and Lauren	"Get Up!"	Dutch, English	7	61
2011	Femke	"Een kusje meer"	Dutch (Note: Contains one phrase in French)	7	64
2012	Fabian	"Abracadabra"	Dutch	5	72

== Commentators and spokespersons ==
The contests are broadcast online worldwide through the official Junior Eurovision Song Contest website junioreurovision.tv and YouTube. In 2015, the online broadcasts featured commentary in English by junioreurovision.tv editor Luke Fisher and 2011 Bulgarian Junior Eurovision Song Contest entrant Ivan Ivanov. The Belgian broadcasters, VRT and RTBF, send their own commentator to each contest in order to provide commentary in Dutch and French. Spokespersons were also chosen by the national broadcaster in order to announce the awarding points from Belgium. The table below list the details of each commentator and spokesperson since 2003.

Year	Flemish commentator	Walloon commentator	Spokesperson	Ref.
2003	Ilse Van Hoecke and Bart Peeters	Corinne Boulangier	Judith Bussé	
2004	Ilse Van Hoecke and Marcel Vanthilt	Jean-Louis Lahaye	Alexander Schönfelder	
2005	Ilse Van Hoecke and André Vermeulen	Jean-Louis Lahaye	Max Colombie	
2006	Ilse Van Hoecke and Jelle Cleymans	No broadcast	Sander Cliquet	
2007	Kristien Maes and Ben Roelants	No broadcast	Bab Buelens	
2008	Kristien Maes and Ben Roelants	No broadcast	Chloé Ditlefsen	
2009	Kristien Maes and Ben Roelants	No broadcast	Oliver Symons	
2010	Kristien Maes and Tom De Cock	No broadcast	Laura Omloop	
2011	Kristien Maes and Tom De Cock	No broadcast	Jill Van Vooren & Lauren De Ruyck	
2012	Astrid Demeure and Tom De Cock	No broadcast	Femke Verschueren	
2013–2026	No broadcast	No broadcast	Did not participate	

== Hostings ==
Year	Location	Venue	Presenters
2005	Hasselt	Ethias Arena	Maureen Louys and Marcel Vanthilt

=== Gallery ===
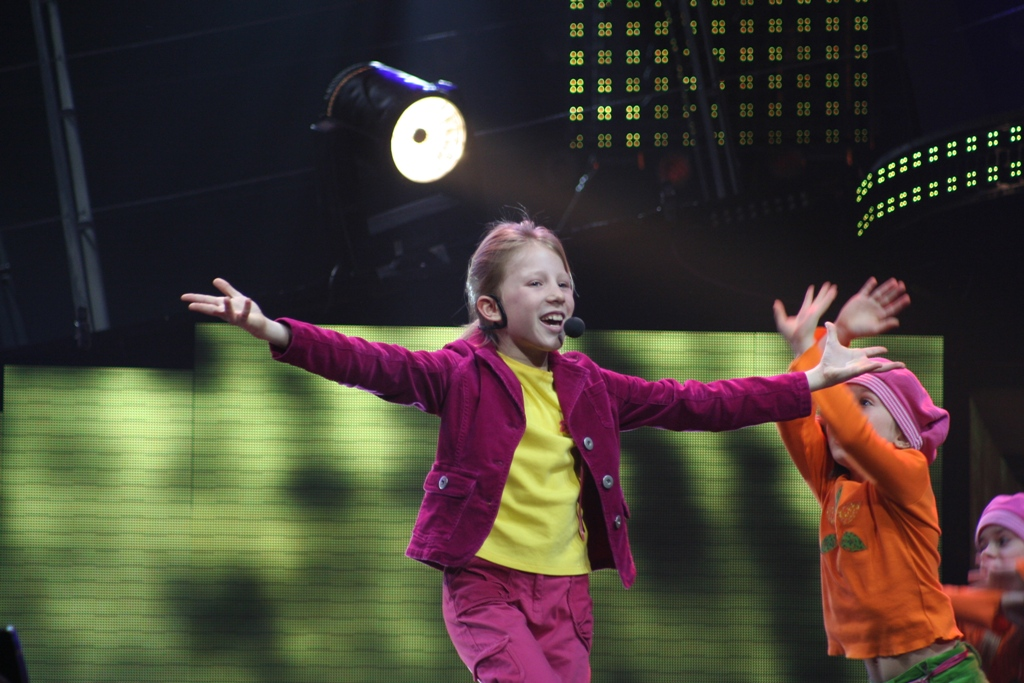
Lindsay represented Belgium at the 2005 contest held in Hasselt

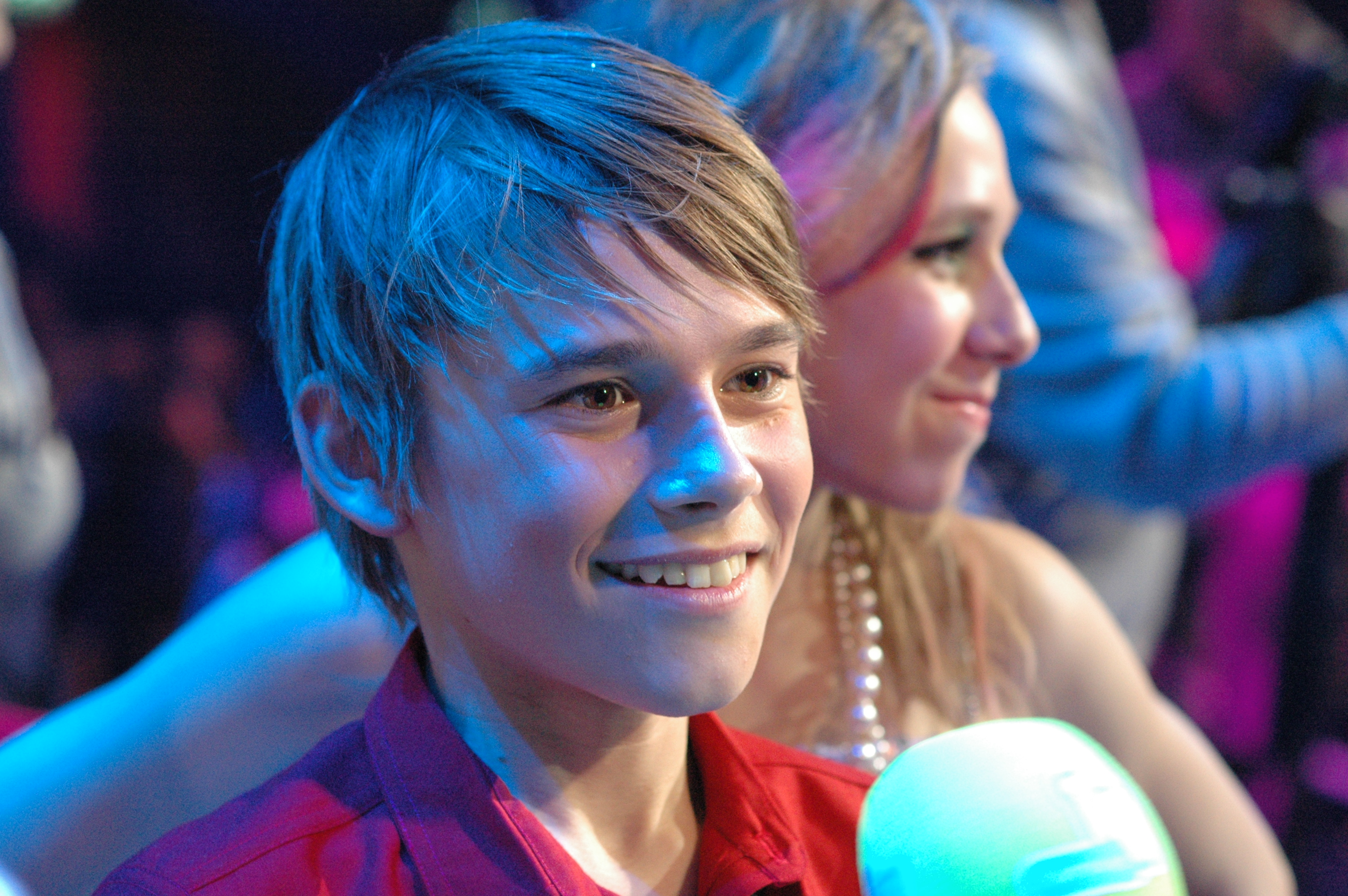
Fabian represented Belgium at the 2012 contest held in Amsterdam

== See also ==
- Belgium in the Eurovision Song Contest – Senior version of the Junior Eurovision Song Contest.
