= Sweden in the Junior Eurovision Song Contest =

- Junior Eurovision Song Contest
- Participating broadcaster: Sveriges Television (SVT; 2003–2005, 2010–2014) Formerly: TV4 (2006–2007, 2009)

Participation summary
- Appearances: 11
- First appearance: 2003
- Last appearance: 2014
- Highest placement: 3rd: 2006
- Participation history: 2003; 2004; 2005; 2006; 2007; 2008; 2009; 2010; 2011; 2012; 2013; 2014; 2015 – 2026

Related articles
- Lilla Melodifestivalen
- For the most recent participation see Sweden in the Junior Eurovision Song Contest 2014

Sweden has been represented at the Junior Eurovision Song Contest eleven times since its inception in 2003. Two Swedish broadcasters have participated in the contest – from 2003 to 2005, Sveriges Television (SVT) participated before withdrawing with other Nordic broadcasters. From 2006 to 2009, commercial broadcaster TV4 was the one participating.

TV4 withdrew from the 2008 contest after two entries due to other plans being made during the time of the contest, however they returned to the contest in 2009. On 29 June 2015, it was announced that SVT would withdraw for one year. However, as of 2026, Sweden is yet to return to the contest.

== History ==
Sweden are one of the sixteen countries to have made their debut at the inaugural Junior Eurovision Song Contest 2003, which took place on 15 November 2003 at the Forum in Copenhagen, Denmark.

Much like it did for the Eurovision, Sveriges Television managed the national selection for the Junior Eurovision from 2003 to 2005. SVT used a spin-off of Melodifestivalen, Lilla Melodifestivalen, which debuted in 2002 to select an entry for MGP Nordic, a then one-off junior song contest between Sweden and 2 other Nordic countries (which was temporarily put on hiatus when the JESC was established), to select its entry. However, after the 2005 contest, SVT, along with Norway's NRK and Denmark's DR, jointly pulled out of the JESC due to concerns about the treatment of the participants in the contest, and eventually reviving MGP Nordic afterwards. Many of the Swedish participants have been girls except 2011, 2013, and the spokespersons from 2003 to 2009.

After SVT pulled out, commercial broadcaster TV4 decided to take over organizing the Swedish delegation for the JESC. TV4 would organize its own competition to select its entry for the JESC, while in parallel, SVT's contest would still be active, but with its winner being sent to MGP Nordic instead. In the 2006 contest, the first under TV4's control, Sweden would achieve their best result in the JESC, finishing in 3rd place with Molly Sandén's song "Det finaste någon kan få". In 2007 Sandéns younger sister Frida Sandén won the right to represent Sweden in the Junior Eurovision 2007. Before going to Rotterdam Frida had hopes built to score as high as her elder sister but only managed to get 8th place with 83 points. TV4 withdrew from the 2008 contest due to concerns about its viewership, and its plans for the 2008 season. However, TV4 confirmed that it would return for the 2009 edition.

On 9 April 2010, TV4 decided to withdraw again from Junior Eurovision in Minsk. However, the European Broadcasting Union confirmed on 28 July 2010 that Sweden would participate in the contest, after SVT decided to return to the contest. On 24 January 2015, SVT announced the cancellation of Lilla Melodifestivalen as the national selection for the Junior Eurovision Song Contest, and instead plans to come up with a new contest. No details about this have been unveiled. On 29 June 2015, it was announced that SVT, the Swedish national broadcaster, would withdraw for one year and thus not compete for Sweden in the forthcoming contest in Bulgaria. TV4 was not prepared for a withdrawal and therefore ruled out participating.

In December 2021, it was reported that SVT sent a delegation to observe that year's contest in Paris although this was not verified. Representatives from Norway's NRK and Iceland's RÚV were confirmed to be in attendance. In May 2023, the EBU talked about how they can work to remove pressure on the participants from Junior Eurovision for the first time since 2005 in hopes that the Nordic broadcasters, including SVT, would approve. Later that year in October, the EBU launched a child safety and protection protocol that aims to remove pressure, in hopes of bringing back the Nordic countries in 2024 and beyond. Despite this, on 5 January 2024, SVT confirmed that Sweden would not return in 2024.

== Participation overview ==
Table key
3	Third place

Year	Artist	Song	Language	Place	Points
2003	The Honeypies	"Stoppa mig"	Swedish	15	12
2004	Limelights	"Varför jag?"	Swedish	15	8
2005	M+	"Gränslös kärlek"	Swedish	15	22
2006	Molly Sandén	"Det finaste någon kan få"	Swedish	3	116
2007	Frida Sandén	"Nu eller aldrig"	Swedish	8	83
2009	Mimmi Sandén	"Du"	Swedish	6	68
2010	Josefine Ridell	"Allt jag vill ha"	Swedish	11	48
2011	Erik Rapp	"Faller"	Swedish	9	57
2012	Lova Sönnerbo	"Mitt mod"	Swedish	6	70
2013	Eliias	"Det är dit vi ska"	Swedish	9	46
2014	Julia Kedhammar	"Du är inte ensam"	Swedish, English	13	28

=== Photogallery ===
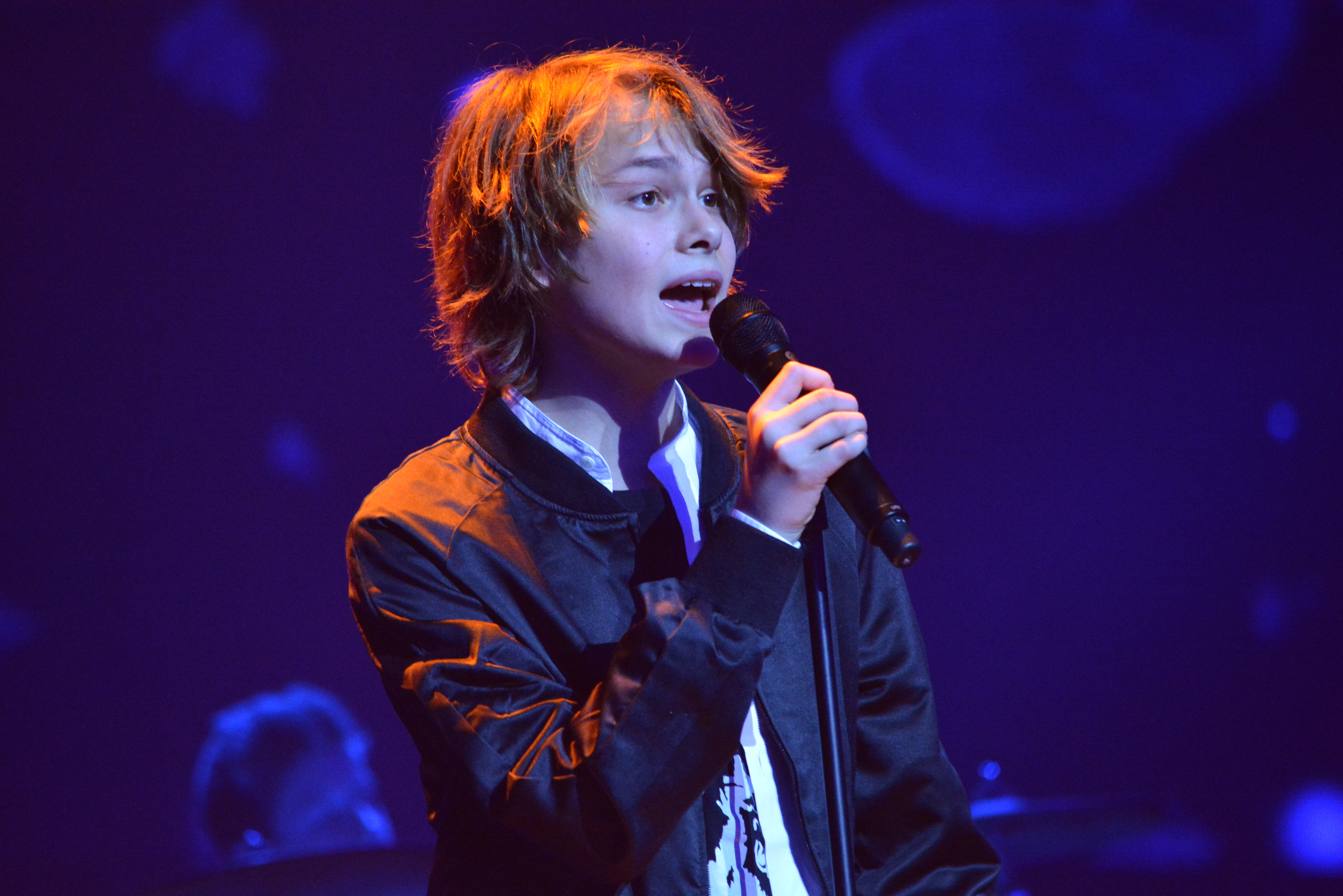
Eliias in Kyiv (2013)

== Commentators and spokespersons ==
The contests are broadcast online worldwide through the official Junior Eurovision Song Contest website junioreurovision.tv and YouTube. In 2015, the online broadcasts featured commentary in English by junioreurovision.tv editor Luke Fisher and 2011 Bulgarian Junior Eurovision Song Contest entrant Ivan Ivanov. The Swedish broadcaster sent their own commentator to each contest in order to provide commentary in the Swedish language. Spokespersons were also chosen by the national broadcaster in order to announce the awarding points from Sweden. The table below list the details of each commentator and spokesperson since 2003.

Year(s)	Channel	Commentator(s)	Spokesperson
2003	SVT1	Victoria Dyring	Siri Lindgren
2004	SVT1	Pekka Heino	Vännerna Queenie Marksdotter
2005	SVT1	Josefine Sundström	Halahen Zajden
2006	TV4	Adam Alsing	Amy Deasismont
2007	TV4	Adam Alsing	Molly Sandén
2008	No broadcast		Did not participate
2009	TV4 (aired the morning after)	Johanna Karlsson	Elise Mattison
2010	SVT24	Edward af Sillén and Malin Olsson	Robin Ridell
2011	SVT Barnkanalen	Edward af Sillén and Ylva Hällen	Ina-Jane von Herff
2012	SVT Barnkanalen	Edward af Sillén and Ylva Hällen	Leya Gullström
2013	SVT Barnkanalen	Edward af Sillén and Ylva Hällen	Lova Sönnerbo
2014	SVT Barnkanalen	Edward af Sillén and Ylva Hällen	Elias Elffors Elfström
2015–2026	No broadcast		Did not participate

== See also ==
- Sweden in the Eurovision Song Contest – Senior version of the Junior Eurovision Song Contest.
