= Macedonia in the Junior Eurovision Song Contest 2013 =

- Junior Eurovision Song Contest 2013
- Country: Macedonia
- Selection process: Internal selection
- Announcement date: Artist: 17 October 2013; Song: 7 November 2013

Competing entry
- Song: "Ohrid i muzika"
- Artist: Barbara Popović

Placement
- Final result: 12th, 19 points

Participation chronology

Macedonia was represented at the Junior Eurovision Song Contest 2013 in Kyiv, Ukraine. The Macedonian entry was selected through an internal selection. On 17 October 2013, it was revealed that Barbara Popović would represent Macedonia in the contest. It was announced on 30 October 2013 that her song would be called "Ohrid i muzika."

== Internal selection ==
On 26 September, it was reported that the Macedonian broadcaster MRT decided to select their 2013 artist internally. On 17 October 2013, MRT revealed that 13-year-old Barbara Popović would represent Macedonia. The title of the song was revealed to be "Ohrid i muzika" on 30 October 2013.

The song was presented to the public on 7 November 2013.

== At Junior Eurovision ==
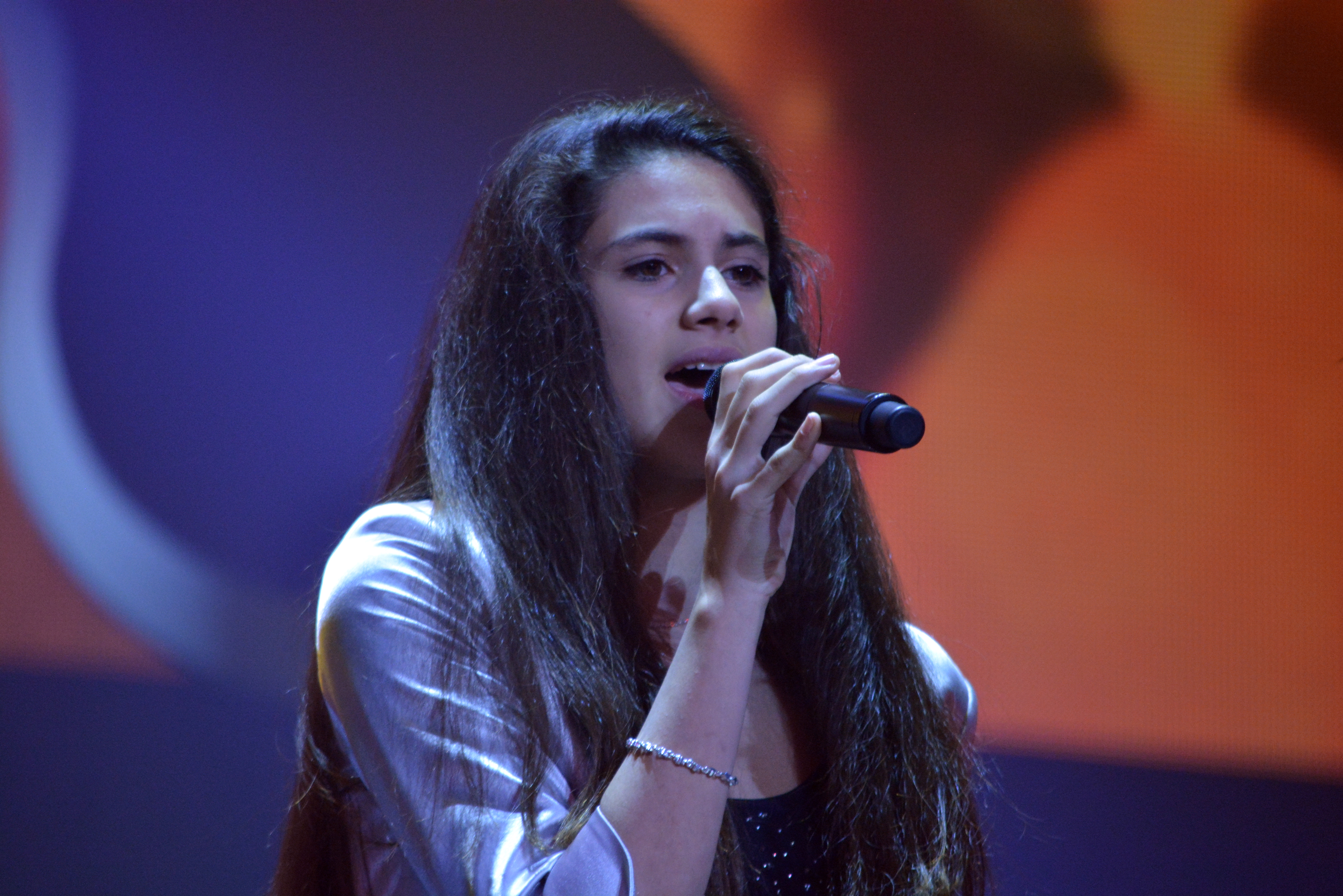
Barbara Popović at the second rehearsal in Kyiv.

During the allocation draw on 25 November 2013, Macedonia was drawn to perform 5th, following San Marino and preceding Ukraine. Macedonia placed 12th and last, scoring 19 points.

Barbara Popović was joined on stage by three dancers from the ballet studio "Eureka:" Ognen Angushev, Emilijana Jovkovska and Sara Kastratovic.

In Macedonia, the show was broadcast on MRT with commentary by Tina Teutovic and Spasija Veljanoska. Sofija Spasenoska was the Macedonian spokesperson who revealed the result of the Macedonian vote.

=== Voting ===
Points awarded to Macedonia
| Score | Country |
|---|---|
| 12 points (Note: All countries received one set of 12 points to ensure no country finished with nul points.) | |
| 10 points | |
| 8 points | |
| 7 points | |
| 6 points | |
| 5 points | |
| 4 points | |
| 3 points | |
| 2 points | Armenia |
| 1 point | Azerbaijan; Belarus; Malta; Netherlands; Sweden |

Points awarded by Macedonia
| Score | Country |
|---|---|
| 12 points | Malta |
| 10 points | Georgia |
| 8 points | Ukraine |
| 7 points | Belarus |
| 6 points | Russia |
| 5 points | Netherlands |
| 4 points | Armenia |
| 3 points | Moldova |
| 2 points | Azerbaijan |
| 1 point | Sweden |
