= Russia in the Junior Eurovision Song Contest 2013 =

- Junior Eurovision Song Contest 2013
- Country: Russia
- Selection process: National final
- Selection date: 2 June 2013

Competing entry
- Song: "Dream On"
- Artist: Dayana Kirillova

Placement
- Final result: 4th, 106 points

Participation chronology

Russia was represented at the Junior Eurovision Song Contest 2013 in Kyiv, Ukraine. The Russian entry was selected through a national final, organised by Russian broadcaster All-Russia State Television and Radio Company (VGTRK). The final was held on 2 June 2013. Dayana Kirillova and her song "Mechtay" won the national final, getting 12.19% of votes.

== Before Junior Eurovision ==
=== National final ===
On 10 March 2013, VGTRK announced that a national final would be held to select Russia' entry for the Junior Eurovision Song Contest 2013. A submission period for interested artists was opened and lasted until 1 May 2013. A professional jury selected eighteen artists and songs from the applicants to proceed to the televised national final. The selected artists and songs competed at the national final which took place on 2 June 2013 at the State Kremlin Palace in Moscow, hosted by Dmitry Guberniev and Anastasiya Chernobrovina. The winner was determined by a 50/50 combination of jury voting and televoting. The members of the jury were Grigory Gladkov, Yulia Savicheva, Larisa Rubalskaya, Gennady Gokhstein and Alexander Igudin. In addition to the performances from the competitors, the show featured guest performances by Lerika, Buranovskiye Babushki and "Domisolka" theater.

Final – 2 June 2013
Draw	Artist	Song	Percentage	Place
1	Vanessa Bezrodnaya	"Dinamit" (Динамит)	2.59%	15
2	Ulyana Kuznetsova	"Devochka-prazdnik" (Девочка-праздник)	6.06%	7
3	Druzhnie sestryonki	"Utki poyut" (Утки поют)	4.90%	11
4	Dayana Kirillova	"Mechtay" (Мечтай)	12.19%	1
5	Anastasiya Egorkina	"Muzyka" (Музыка)	5.74%	9
6	Anastasiya Zuyeva	"Mechta" (Мечта)	3.40%	13
7	Kseniya Mulina	"Vyshe nulya" (Выше нуля)	3.73%	12
8	Elizaveta Puris	"Novy den" (Новый день)	10.22%	2
9	Arina Bagaryakova	"Hudozhnik" (Художник)	1.62%	18
10	Angelina Kolesnikova	"Ryzhaya" (Рыжая)	7.08%	5
11	4EVER	"Prosto drug" (Просто друг)	6.63%	6
12	Vyacheslav Kvasov	"Tantsuy pod lunoy" (Танцуй под луной)	1.91%	17
13	Valeriya Eroshenko	"Nebo v nochi" (Небо в ночи)	8.26%	4
14	Diana Soldysheva	"Polovinki" (Половинки)	5.60%	10
15	Larisa Grigoryeva	"Babochka" (Бабочка)	5.91%	8
16	Anna Muzafarova	"Na oblаkah" (На облаках)	2.99%	14
17	Sofiya Fisenko	"Luchshiye druzya" (Лучшие друзья)	9.20%	3
18	Alisa Sementina	"Raspahnyom my krylya" (Распахнём мы крылья)	1.98%	16

== At Junior Eurovision ==
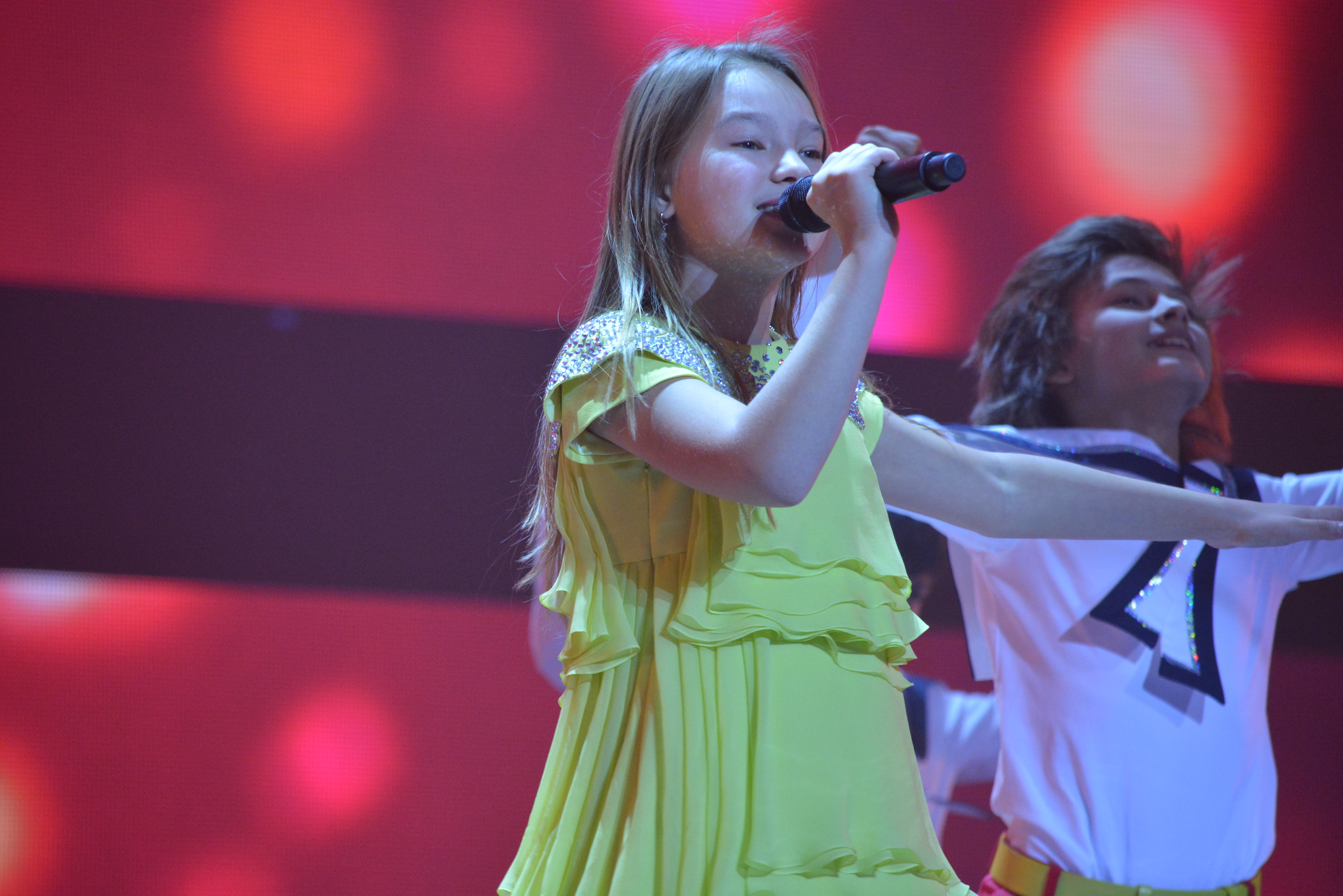
Dayana Kirillova at the first rehearsal in Kyiv.

During the allocation draw on 25 November 2013, Russia was drawn to close the show and perform 12th, following Malta. Russia placed 4th, scoring 106 points.

Dayana Kirillova was joined on stage by four boys from Alla Dukhova's dance troupe "Todes": Georgy, Yury, Ildar and Ilya.

In Russia, show were broadcast on Carousel with commentary by Alexander Gurevich. The Russian spokesperson revealing the result of the Russian vote was Mariya Bakhireva.

=== Voting ===
Points awarded to Russia
Score	Country
12 points (Note: All countries received one set of 12 points to ensure no country finished with nul points.)	Armenia; Azerbaijan; Sweden
10 points	Netherlands
8 points	Belarus; San Marino
7 points	Ukraine
6 points	Kids Jury; Macedonia
5 points	Georgia; Moldova
4 points	
3 points	Malta
2 points	
1 point	

Points awarded by Russia
Score	Country
12 points	Belarus
10 points	Malta
8 points	Ukraine
7 points	Azerbaijan
6 points	Georgia
5 points	Armenia
4 points	San Marino
3 points	Netherlands
2 points	Sweden
1 point	Moldova
