= Belarus in the Junior Eurovision Song Contest 2013 =

- Junior Eurovision Song Contest 2013
- Country: Belarus
- Selection process: National Final; 50% Jury; 50% Televoting
- Selection date: 4 October 2013

Competing entry
- Song: "Poy so mnoy"
- Artist: Ilya Volkov

Placement
- Final result: 3rd, 108 points

Participation chronology

Belarus was represented at the Junior Eurovision Song Contest 2013 in Kyiv, Ukraine. The Belarusian entry was selected through a national final, organised by Belarusian broadcaster Belarusian Television and Radio Company (BTRC). The final was held on 4 October 2013. Ilya Volkov and his song "Poy so mnoy" won the national final, scoring 18 points.

== Before Junior Eurovision ==
=== National final ===
On 19 March 2013, BTRC announced that a national final would be held to select Belarus' entry for the Junior Eurovision Song Contest 2013.

==== Competing entries ====
A submission period for interested artists was opened and lasted until 10 June 2013. After the deadline passed, 53 applications were received by the broadcaster. A professional jury selected ten artists and songs from the applicants to proceed to the televised national final.

==== Final ====
The final took place on 4 October 2013 at the Studio 600 in Minsk, hosted by Teo, Belarus' 2014 Eurovision contestant, and Alyona Lanskaya, Belarus' 2013 Eurovision contestant. The winner was determined by a 50/50 combination of votes from a jury made up of music professionals and a public vote.

The members of the jury were Irina Dorofeeva, Elena Atrashkevich, Lyudmila Borodina, Gennadiy Markevich, Nadezhda Vasilchenko, Olga Vorobyova, Tatyana Yakusheva, Tatyana Parhamovich and Eduard Zaritsky.

Final – 4 October 2013
Draw	Artist	Song	Language	Jury	Televote		Total	Place
1	Ruslan Aslanov	"Zvyozdy zovut"	Russian	5	2,603	6	11	7
2	Angelina Pipper	"My tantsuyem dzhaz"	Russian	1	5,558	12	13	4
3	Kseniya Tereshonok	"Pod parusom mechty"	Russian	4	2,576	5	9	8
4	Danaya Sharshavitskaya	"Prostoy motiv"	Russian	2	627	1	3	10
5	Igor Muravkin	"Sontsa svetsits usim!"	Belarusian	12	1,383	3	15	3
6	Yulia Mozhilovskaya	"Mechty"	Russian	3	2,827	8	11	5
7	Vladlen Ivanov	"Belye oblaka"	Russian	7	2,390	4	11	6
8	Ilya Volkov	"Poy so mnoy"	Russian	8	3,294	10	18	1
9	Nadezhda Misyakova	"Delovaya"	Russian	6	1,074	2	8	9
10	Anna Zaitseva	"My pomnim"	Russian	10	2,776	7	17	2

== At Junior Eurovision ==
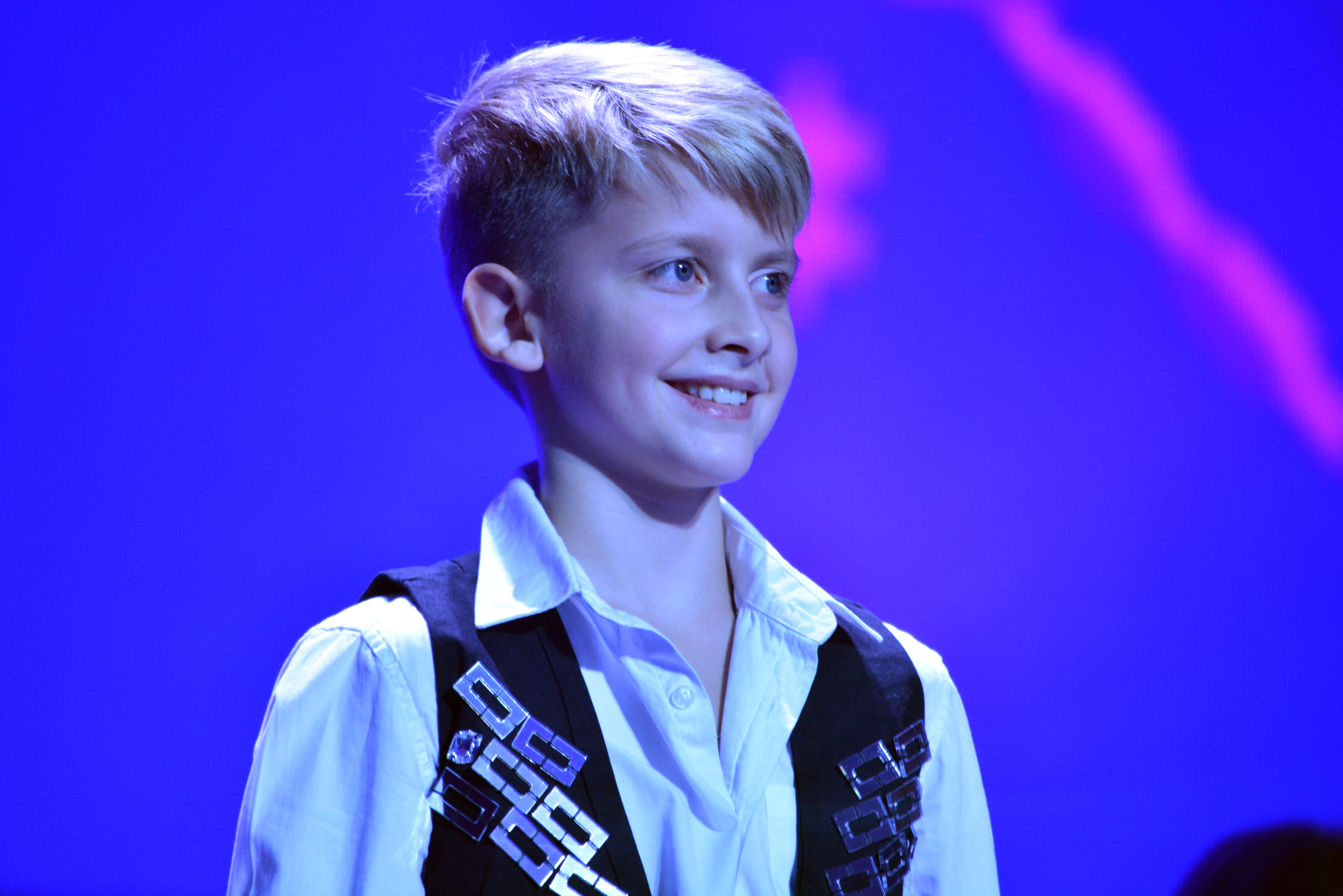
Ilya Volkov at the second dress rehearsal in Kyiv.

During the allocation draw on 25 November 2013, Belarus was drawn to perform 7th, following Ukraine and preceding Moldova. Belarus placed 3rd, scoring 108 points.

Ilya Volkov were joined on stage by dance group "Maxi Briz": Leyla Tabatadze, Iolanta Verbitskaya, Milena Volskaya, Katya Artemyeva, Dinara Geydarova.

In Belarus, show were broadcast on BTRC with commentary by Anatoliy Lipetskiy. The Belarusian spokesperson revealing the result of the Belarusian vote was Sasha Tkach.

=== Voting ===
Points awarded to Belarus
Score	Country
12 points (Note: All countries received one set of 12 points to ensure no country finished with nul points.)	Russia
10 points	Kids Jury; Malta; Moldova
8 points	Georgia; Netherlands; Ukraine
7 points	Macedonia
6 points	Armenia; Azerbaijan; San Marino
5 points	Sweden
4 points	
3 points	
2 points	
1 point	

Points awarded by Belarus
Score	Country
12 points	Ukraine
10 points	Malta
8 points	Russia
7 points	Georgia
6 points	Netherlands
5 points	Sweden
4 points	Moldova
3 points	San Marino
2 points	Armenia
1 point	Macedonia
