= Ukraine in the Junior Eurovision Song Contest 2013 =

- Junior Eurovision Song Contest 2013
- Country: Ukraine
- Selection process: National Final
- Selection date: 2 August 2013

Competing entry
- Song: "We Are One"
- Artist: Sofia Tarasova

Placement
- Final result: 2nd, 121 points

Participation chronology

Ukraine was represented at the Junior Eurovision Song Contest 2013 in Kyiv, Ukraine. On 2 August 2013 a national selection was held, out of which Sofia Tarasova and her song "We Are One" were later declared the winner and represented Ukraine.

== Before Junior Eurovision ==
=== National final ===
The final took place on 2 August 2013, which saw twenty competing acts participating in a televised production where the winner was determined by a 50/50 combination of both public telephone vote and the votes of jury members made up of music professionals. After a four-way tie for the first place, Sofia Tarasova was selected to represent Ukraine with the song "We Are One".

Draw	Artist	Song	Jury	Televote	Total	Place
1	Sofia Kutsenko	"Lastivka"	13	13	16	18
2	Erik Saharyan	"Ti kohay"	14	2	16	17
3	Valeriya Simulik	"Tviy noviy den"	11	16	17	16
4	Angelina Logvinenko	"U gorah"	12	4	16	19
5	Radiosimya	"Sontse, more y ostrovi"	12	5	17	15
6	Ivanna Orlyuk	"Chekayu"	14	16	30	6
7	Kirillo Sokolov	"Divchinka-Schastya"	12	18	30	7
8	Yana Gurylyova	"Vitre"	12	14	26	9
9	Bon Appetit	"Tehas"	13	8	21	11
10	Hrystina Tkachuk	"Mama"	15	6	21	10
11	Kapriz-Juniors	"Pisnya poyednaye nas"	12	7	19	14
12	Andriy Boyko	"Lyubov u kozhnomu"	19	9	28	8
13	Dmitro Ludanniy	"Zasinay"	17	3	20	12
14	Co.Mix	"Chicago"	15	10	15	20
15	Inessa Gritsaenko	"Znayu"	18	12	30	5
16	Polina Andreyeva	"Tvoya zemlya"	16	15	31	2
17	Sofia Kutsenko	"Rozpovid"	11	20	31	4
18	Alim Khakimov	"Prosti slova"	12	19	31	3
19	Sofia Tarasova	"We Are One"	20	11	31	1
20	Anna Vagabova	"Happy Life"	12	17	19	13

== At Junior Eurovision ==
=== Voting ===
The voting during the final consisted of 50 percent public televoting and 50 percent from a jury deliberation. The jury consisted of five music industry professionals who were citizens of the country they represent, with their names published before the contest to ensure transparency. This jury was asked to judge each contestant based on: vocal capacity; the stage performance; the song's composition and originality; and the overall impression by the act. In addition, no member of a national jury could be related in any way to any of the competing acts in such a way that they cannot vote impartially and independently. The individual rankings of each jury member were released one month after the final.

During the allocation draw on 25 November 2013, Ukraine was drawn to perform 6th, following Macedonia and preceding Belarus. Ukraine placed 2nd, scoring 121 points.

=== Voting ===
Points awarded to Ukraine
Score	Country
12 points (Note: All countries received one set of 12 points to ensure no country finished with nul points.)	Belarus; Malta; San Marino
10 points	Azerbaijan; Sweden
8 points	Armenia; Kids Jury; Macedonia; Russia
7 points	Georgia; Moldova; Netherlands
6 points	
5 points	
4 points	
3 points	
2 points	
1 point	

Points awarded by Ukraine
Score	Country
12 points	Malta
10 points	Azerbaijan
8 points	Belarus
7 points	Russia
6 points	Georgia
5 points	Armenia
4 points	Netherlands
3 points	Moldova
2 points	Sweden
1 point	San Marino
