= Georgia in the Junior Eurovision Song Contest 2013 =

- Junior Eurovision Song Contest 2013
- Country: Georgia
- Selection process: Internal Selection
- Selection date: September 2013

Competing entry
- Song: "Give Me Your Smile"
- Artist: The Smile Shop

Placement
- Final result: 5th, 91 points

Participation chronology

Georgia was represented at the Junior Eurovision Song Contest 2013 which took place on 30 November 2013, in Kyiv, Ukraine. Georgian Public Broadcaster (GPB) was responsible for organising their entry for the contest. The Smile Shop was internally selected to represent Georgia with the song "Give Me Your Smile". Georgia placed 5th with 91 points.

== Background ==
Prior to the 2013 Contest, Georgia had participated in the Junior Eurovision Song Contest six times since its debut in 2007. They have never missed an edition of the contest, and have won twice at the 2008, and 2011 contests.

== Before Junior Eurovision ==
The Georgian broadcaster announced on 10 June 2013, that they would be participating at the contest to be held in Kyiv, Ukraine. Their artist and song were selected through an internal selection. On 8 October 2013, The Smile Shop was selected to represent Georgia with their song for the contest, "Give Me Your Smile".

== At Junior Eurovision ==
During the opening ceremony and the running order draw which took place on 25 November 2013, Georgia received a 'wildcard', enabling them to choose their running order position. They chose to run 9th on 30 November 2015, following Moldova and preceding the Netherlands.

=== Final ===
The Smile Shop performed in three pairs in old-fashioned attire amidst a backdrop of colourful floating smiling faces.

=== Voting ===
Points awarded to Georgia
Score	Country
12 points (Note: All countries received one set of 12 points to ensure no country finished with nul points.)	
10 points	Macedonia; San Marino
8 points	Azerbaijan; Moldova
7 points	Armenia; Belarus; Kids Jury
6 points	Russia; Ukraine
5 points	Malta; Netherlands
4 points	
3 points	
2 points	
1 point	

Points awarded by Georgia
Score	Country
12 points	Armenia
10 points	Azerbaijan
8 points	Belarus
7 points	Ukraine
6 points	Malta
5 points	Russia
4 points	Moldova
3 points	San Marino
2 points	Netherlands
1 point	Sweden
