= Moldova in the Junior Eurovision Song Contest 2013 =

- Junior Eurovision Song Contest 2013
- Country: Moldova
- Selection process: Selecția Națională 2013
- Selection date: 20 October 2013

Competing entry
- Song: "Cum să fim"
- Artist: Rafael Bobeica

Placement
- Final result: 11th, 41 points

Participation chronology

Moldova was represented by Rafael Bobeica in the Junior Eurovision Song Contest 2013 with the song "Cum să fim".

== Before Junior Eurovision ==
=== Selecția Națională 2013 ===
5 entries were submitted to TRM, which all were chosen to compete in the national final. After the list was released, Tatiana Ţîgîrlaş, one of the participants, withdrew from the competition.

A non-televised national final took place on 20 October 2013 at the TRM Studio 2. Four songs competed and the winner was selected by the votes of an expert jury.

Draw	Artist	Song	Points	Place
1	Rafael Bobeica	"Cum să fim"	62	1
2	Daria Boboc	"Lasă-mă, că eu am de învăţat"	47	3
3	Rozalinda Buldumea	"Bombonica"	47	3
~~4~~	Tatiana Ţîgîrlaş	"Visul meu"	—	—
5	Andreea Braga	"Euromelody"	60	2

Detailed Jury Votes
Draw	Song	I. Brătescu	C. Pintilie	C. Gîrlă	I. Filip	R. Cheptine	A. Gorgos	I. Cobîleanschii	Total
1	"Cum să fim"	10	10	8	9	8	9	8	62
2	"Lasă-mă, că eu am de învăţat"	7	8	6	8	6	8	4	47
3	"Bombonica"	8	7	7	7	7	6	5	47
4	"Visul meu"	—	—	—	—	—	—	—	—
5	"Euromelody"	9	9	9	10	9	9	7	60

== At Junior Eurovision ==
The voting during the final consisted of 50 percent public televoting and 50 percent from a jury deliberation. The jury consisted of five music industry professionals who were citizens of the country they represent, with their names published before the contest to ensure transparency. This jury was asked to judge each contestant based on: vocal capacity; the stage performance; the song's composition and originality; and the overall impression by the act. In addition, no member of a national jury could be related in any way to any of the competing acts in such a way that they cannot vote impartially and independently. The individual rankings of each jury member were released one month after the final.

During the allocation draw on 25 November 2013, Moldova was drawn to perform 8th, following Belarus and preceding Georgia. Moldova placed 11th, scoring 41 points.

=== Voting ===
Points awarded to Moldova
Score	Country
12 points (Note: All countries received one set of 12 points to ensure no country finished with nul points.)	
10 points	
8 points	
7 points	
6 points	
5 points	
4 points	Belarus; Georgia; Malta
3 points	Azerbaijan; Macedonia; San Marino; Sweden; Ukraine
2 points	
1 point	Armenia; Russia

Points awarded by Moldova
Score	Country
12 points	Malta
10 points	Belarus
8 points	Georgia
7 points	Ukraine
6 points	Sweden
5 points	Russia
4 points	Armenia
3 points	Azerbaijan
2 points	San Marino
1 point	Netherlands
