= Netherlands in the Junior Eurovision Song Contest 2013 =

2013 Junior Eurovision participation

- Junior Eurovision Song Contest 2013
- Country: Netherlands
- Selection process: Junior Songfestival 2013; 33% Jury; 33% Kids Jury; 33% Televoting
- Selection date: Semi-finals: 14 September 2013; 21 September 2013; Final: 28 September 2013

Competing entry
- Song: "Double Me"
- Artist: Mylène and Rosanne

Placement
- Final result: 8th, 59 points

Participation chronology

The Netherlands selected their Junior Eurovision Song Contest 2013 entry through Junior Songfestival, a national selection consisting of eight songs. The winners of final which took place on 28 September 2013 were Mylène and Rosanne with the song "Double Me", achieving a total of 33 points.

== Before Junior Eurovision ==
=== Junior Songfestival 2013 ===
The songs were split into two semi-finals which took place on the 14 and 21 September 2013. From each semi-final two entries qualified for the final based on the decision of adult and child juries as well as televoting. The fifth entry in the final was chosen by online voting (web wildcard).

==== Competing entries ====
Artist	Song	Songwriter(s)
Sarah and Julia	"Live Life"	Julia Nauta, Sarah Nauta, Eric Van Tijn, Jochem Fluitsma, Kirsten Schneider
Giorgio	"Whatever"	Giorgio Sanches, Brahim Fouradi, Mohamed Fouradi
Mathilde	"Wondergirl"	Mathilde Emanuel, Christiaan Hof, Holger Schwedt
Loeki	"Gewoon in Love"	Loeki Jeuken, Nando Eweg
Kim	"Ik ben verliefd"	Kim Regasa, Christiaan Hof
Roan	"Welkom in mijn dromen"	Roan Pronk, Tjeerd Van Zanen
Dali	"Mijn eigen lied"	Dali Philippo, Ed Struijlaart
Mylène and Rosanne	"Double Me"	Mylene Waalewijn, Rosanne Waalewijn, Tjeerd Oosterhuis

Table key
Participants who qualified to the final via jury and televoting.
Participants who qualified to the final via wildcard

==== Semi-final 1 ====
Semi-final 1 – 14 September 2013
Draw	Artist	Song	Kids Jury	Jury	Televote	Total	Place
1	Sarah and Julia	"Live Life"	12	12	12	36	1
2	Giorgio	"Whatever"	9	10	8	27	4
3	Mathilde	"Wondergirl"	10	8	9	27	3
4	Loeki	"Gewoon in Love"	8	9	10	27	2

==== Semi-final 2 ====
Semi-final 2 – 21 September 2013
Draw	Artist	Song	Kids Jury	Jury	Televote	Total	Place
1	Mylène and Rosanne	"Double Me"	10	9	12	31	2
2	Kim	"Ik ben verliefd"	12	12	10	34	1
3	Roan	"Welkom in mijn dromen"	8	8	9	25	4
4	Dali	"Mijn eigen lied"	9	10	8	27	3

==== Final ====
Final – 28 September 2013
Draw	Artist	Song	Kids Jury	Jury	Televote	Total	Place
1	Loeki	"Gewoon in Love"	7	8	7	22	5
2	Kim	"Ik ben verliefd"	10	12	9	31	2
3	Sarah and Julia	"Live Life"	9	10	10	29	3
4	Mathilde	"Wondergirl"	8	7	8	23	4
5	Mylène and Rosanne	"Double Me"	12	9	12	33	1

== At Junior Eurovision ==
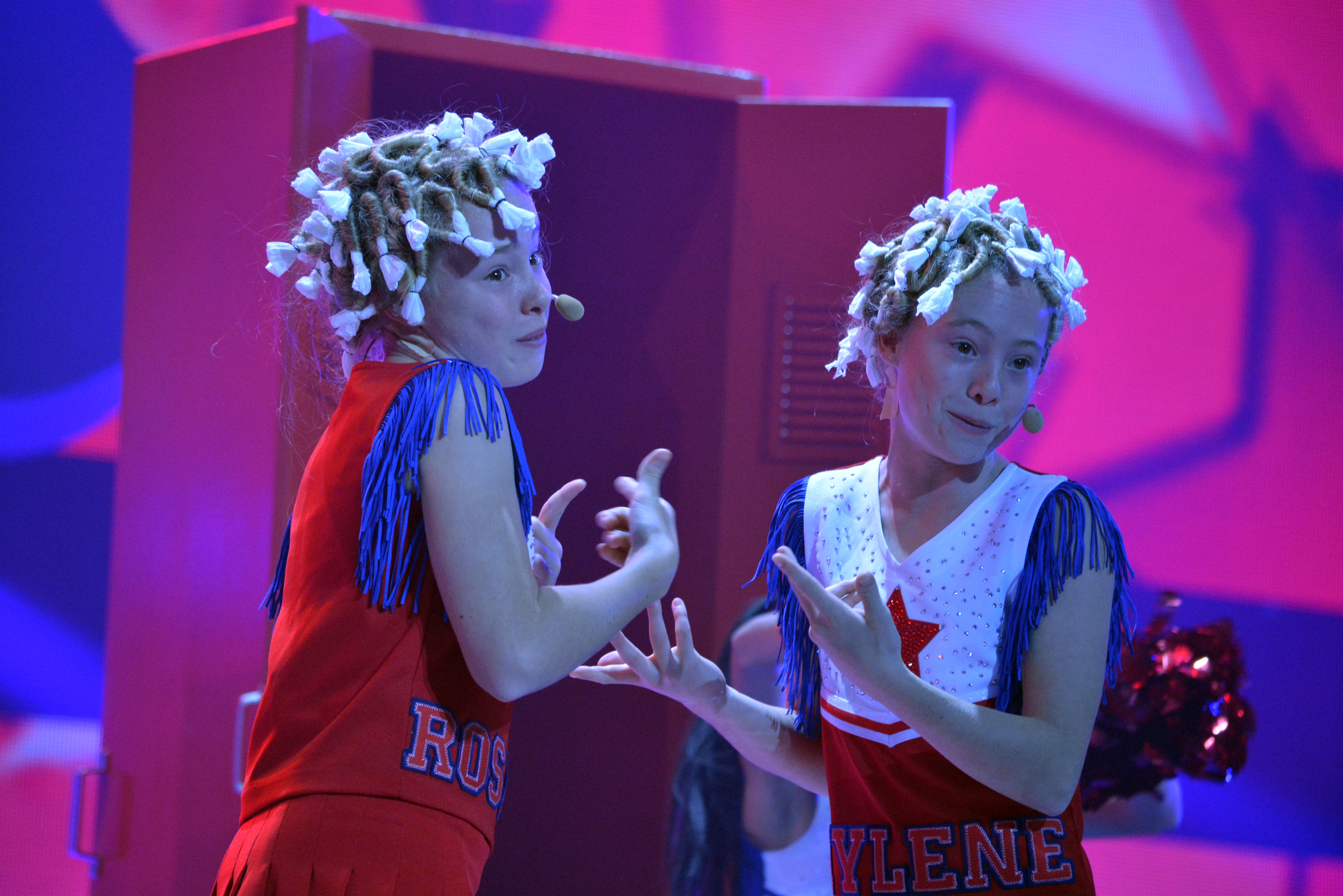
Mylène and Rosanne at Junior Eurovision Song Contest 2013, Kyiv

During the running order draw, which took place on 25 November 2013 in Kyiv, Ukraine, The Netherlands were drawn to perform tenth, following Georgia and preceding Malta.

=== Voting ===
Points awarded to the Netherlands
Score	Country
12 points (Note: All countries received one set of 12 points to ensure no country finished with nul points.)	
10 points	
8 points	
7 points	Malta
6 points	Belarus; Sweden
5 points	Armenia; Azerbaijan; Macedonia
4 points	Ukraine
3 points	Russia
2 points	Georgia; Kids Jury
1 point	Moldova; San Marino

Points awarded by the Netherlands
Score	Country
12 points	Malta
10 points	Russia
8 points	Belarus
7 points	Ukraine
6 points	Armenia
5 points	Georgia
4 points	Sweden
3 points	Azerbaijan
2 points	San Marino
1 point	Macedonia
