= Armenia in the Junior Eurovision Song Contest 2013 =

- Junior Eurovision Song Contest 2013
- Participating broadcaster: Public Television of Armenia (AMPTV)
- Country: Armenia
- Selection process: Mankakan Evratesil 2013
- Selection date: 27 September 2013

Competing entry
- Song: "Choco Factory"
- Artist: Monika
- Songwriters: Emma Asatryan; Monika Avanesyan

Placement
- Final result: 6th, 69 points

Participation chronology

Armenia was represented at the Junior Eurovision Song Contest 2013 with the song "Choco Factory", written by Emma Asatryan and Monika Avanesyan, and performed by Monika herself. The Armenian participating broadcaster, the Public Television of Armenia (AMPTV), selected its entry for the contest through a national final.

== Before Junior Eurovision ==
=== Mankakan Evratesil 2013 ===
The Public Television of Armenia (AMPTV) opened the submission window for the national final from 1 July until 1 September 2013. From the submission window, 82 entries were received and 12 of them were selected to compete in the final. The finalists and the songs were released on 18 September 2013.

The final was held on 27 September 2013 at 19:30 CET and broadcast on Armenia 1. The results were decided by 50% jury and 50% televoting. The jury consisted of Ara Gevorgyan, Ara Torosyan, Naira Gyurjinyan and Syuzan Margaryan.

Key: Winner Second place Third place

Final – 27 September 2013
R/O	Artist	Song	Place
1	Michael Simonyan	"Otar mi vairum" ("Օտար մի վարում")	—N/a
2	Milena Ghazaryan	"Antsanot ashkarh" ("Անցանոտ աշկարհ")	—N/a
3	Mary Vardanyan	"Ergn im ays" ("Էրգն իմ այս")	—N/a
4	Roza Kostandyan	"Gitem" ("Գիտեմ")	—N/a
5	Karen Oughuryan	"Ynkerner enq" ("Ընկերներ էնք")	—N/a
6	David and Erna	"Lusavorakan" ("Լուսավորական")	2
7	Karen Ohanyan	"Share and Like"	—N/a
8	Gayane Ghazaryan	"We Are Young"	—N/a
9	Happy Day	"Happy Day"	3
10	Petros Ghazaryan	"Du-du" ("Դու֊դու")	—N/a
11	Karapet Karapetyan	"Miracles"	—N/a
12	Monika Avanesyan	"Choco fabrika" ("Չոկո ֆաբրիկա")	1

== At Junior Eurovision ==
At the running order draw on 25 November 2013, Armenia were drawn to perform third on 30 November 2013, following Azerbaijan and preceding San Marino.

=== Voting ===
Points awarded to Armenia
Score	Country
12 points (Note: All countries received one set of 12 points to ensure no country finished with nul points.)	Georgia
10 points	
8 points	Malta
7 points	
6 points	Netherlands
5 points	Russia; Ukraine
4 points	Macedonia; Malta; San Marino; Sweden
3 points	Kids Jury
2 points	
1 point	

Points awarded by Armenia
Score	Country
12 points	Russia
10 points	Malta
8 points	Ukraine
7 points	Georgia
6 points	Belarus
5 points	Netherlands
4 points	San Marino
3 points	Sweden
2 points	Macedonia
1 point	Moldova
