= Azerbaijan in the Junior Eurovision Song Contest 2013 =

- Junior Eurovision Song Contest 2013
- Country: Azerbaijan
- Selection process: Internal selection
- Announcement date: Artist: 1 November 2013; Song: 5 November 2013

Competing entry
- Song: "Me and My Guitar"
- Artist: Rustam Karimov

Placement
- Final result: 7th, 66 points

Participation chronology

Azerbaijan was represented at the Junior Eurovision Song Contest 2013 in Kyiv, Ukraine. The Azerbaijani entry was selected through an internal selection. On 1 November 2013 it was revealed that Rustam Karimov would represent Azerbaijan in the contest. It was announced that his song would be called "Me and My Guitar".

== Before Junior Eurovision ==
On 9 October, it was reported that the Azerbaijani broadcaster İctimai Television decided to internally select their 2013 artist with auditions held in the Rashid Behbudov Second Music School in Baku. On 1 November 2013, İctimai revealed that 10-year-old Rustam Karimov would represent Azerbaijan. The title of the song was revealed to be "Me and My Guitar", and the song was presented to the public on 5 November 2013.

== At Junior Eurovision ==
During the allocation draw on 25 November 2013, Azerbaijan was drawn to perform 2nd, following Sweden and preceding Armenia. Azerbaijan placed 7th, scoring 66 points.

In Azerbaijan, show were broadcast on İctimai Television with commentary by Konul Arifziki. The Azerbaijani spokesperson revealing the result of the Azerbaijani vote was Lyaman Mirzalieva.

=== Voting ===
Points awarded to Azerbaijan
Score	Country
12 points (Note: All countries received one set of 12 points to ensure no country finished with nul points.)	
10 points	Georgia; Ukraine
8 points	
7 points	Russia; Sweden
6 points	Malta
5 points	
4 points	Kids Jury
3 points	Moldova; Netherlands
2 points	Macedonia; San Marino
1 point	

Points awarded by Azerbaijan
Score	Country
12 points	Russia
10 points	Ukraine
8 points	Georgia
7 points	Malta
6 points	Belarus
5 points	Netherlands
4 points	Sweden
3 points	Moldova
2 points	San Marino
1 point	Macedonia
