= Sweden in the Junior Eurovision Song Contest 2013 =

- Junior Eurovision Song Contest 2013
- Country: Sweden
- Selection process: Lilla Melodifestivalen 2013
- Selection date: 6 June 2013

Competing entry
- Song: "Det är dit vi ska"
- Artist: Eliias

Placement
- Final result: 9th, 46 points

Participation chronology

Sweden was represented at the Junior Eurovision Song Contest 2013 in Kyiv, Ukraine. The Swedish entry was selected through Lilla Melodifestivalen 2013 which consisted of eight songs. The final was held on 6 June 2013 at the Gröna Lund amusement park in Stockholm. Eliias and his song "Det är dit vi ska" was chosen as the winner.

== Before Junior Eurovision ==
=== Selection procedure ===
On 1 March 2013, SVT announced that a Lilla Melodifestivalen 2013 would be held to select Sweden's entry for the Junior Eurovision Song Contest 2013. A submission period for interested artists was opened and lasted until 27 March 2013. A professional jury selected eight artists and songs from the applicants to proceed to the Lilla Melodifestivalen 2013.

The selected artists and songs competed at the Lilla Melodifestivalen 2013 which took place on 6 June 2013 at the Gröna Lund amusement park in Stockholm, hosted by Behrang Miri and Kim Ohlsson. The members of the jury were Christer Björkman, Carolina Noren and Jan Lundqvist.

=== Final ===
Draw	Artist	Song
1	Mazen Awad	"Kämpa"
2	Mimi & Märta	"Var dej själv!"
3	Tilda Anvemyr	"För alltid"
4	Rami Style	"Nivå från topp till tå"
5	Vilhelm Buchaus	"För alltid och en dag"
6	Elias Elffors Elfström	"Det är dit vi ska"
7	Klara Sundin	"Jag är en ros"
8	Mathilda Lindström	"Lycka"

On 6 June 2013, Elias Elffors Elfström went on to win Lilla Melodifestivalen, the Swedish national selection for the Junior Eurovision Song Contest with his song "Det är dit vi ska". Five months later, he shot a music video for the song, and changed his stage name to Eliias. On 30 November 2013, Eliias went to represent his country at the 11th annual Junior Eurovision Song Contest. "Det är dit vi ska" placed 9th in a field of 12 songs, receiving 46 points.

== At Junior Eurovision ==
During the allocation draw on 25 November 2013, Sweden was drawn to open the show, performing 1st, preceding Azerbaijan. Sweden placed 9th, scoring 46 points.

The members of Swedish jury were Samuel Andersson, Gabriella Benno, Gustav Dahlander, Max Gullström, Ayla Kabaca and Marie Olofsson. The Swedish member of the children's international jury was Maia Ljusberg.

In Sweden, show were broadcast on SVT Barnkanalen with commentary by Ylva Hällen and Edward af Sillén. The Swedish spokesperson revealing the result of the Swedish vote was Lova Sönnerbo.

=== Voting ===
Points awarded to Sweden
Score	Country
12 points (Note: All countries received one set of 12 points to ensure no country finished with nul points.)	
10 points	
8 points	
7 points	
6 points	Moldova
5 points	Belarus; San Marino
4 points	Azerbaijan; Netherlands
3 points	Armenia
2 points	Russia; Ukraine
1 point	Georgia; Kids Jury; Macedonia

Points awarded by Sweden
Score	Country
12 points	Russia
10 points	Ukraine
8 points	Malta
7 points	Azerbaijan
6 points	Netherlands
5 points	Belarus
4 points	Armenia
3 points	Moldova
2 points	San Marino
1 point	Macedonia
