= Mylène and Rosanne =

Dutch singing duo

Mylène & Rosanne
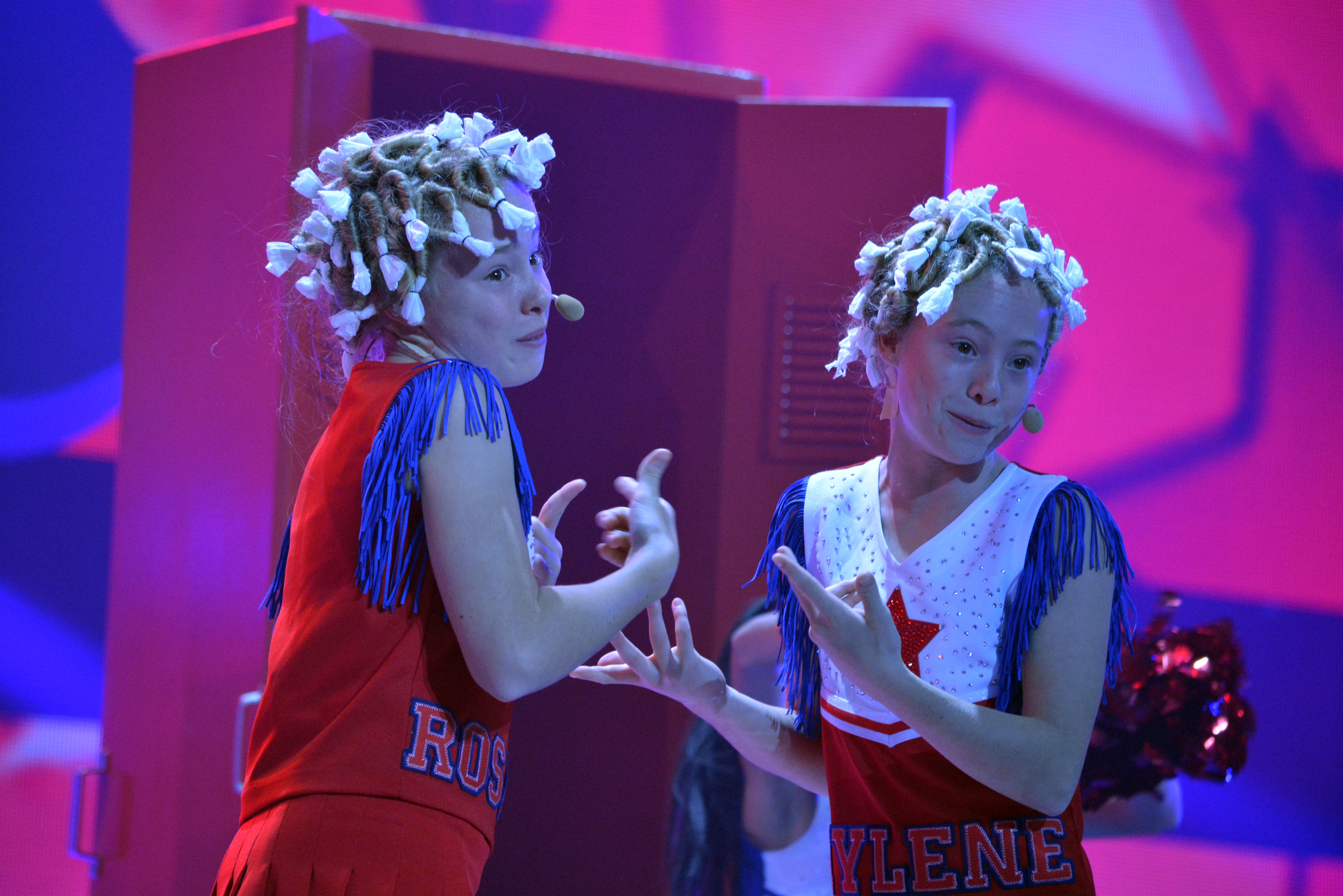

Background information
- Also known as: Mylѐne & Rosanne
- Born: Mylѐne & Rosanne Waalewijn; 12 February 2000 (age 26)
- Origin: Amsterdam, Netherlands
- Genre: Pop
- Years active: 2010–present
- Members: Mylène Waalewijn; Rosanne Waalewijn
- Website: www.mylenerosanne.nl

Mylène & Rosanne is a Dutch singing duo, consisting of the twin sisters Mylène and Rosanne Waalewijn (born 12 February 2000).

== Biography ==
The twins are known for their participation in Junior Songfestival 2013 with the song "Double Me". Mylène & Rosanne won the national finals 28 September 2013 and therefore were to represent the Netherlands in the Junior Eurovision Song Contest 2013 in Kyiv on 30 November 2013.

Before participating in the Junior Eurovision Song Contest, they took part in several musicals and they participated in 2010 and in 2011 in Kinderen voor Kinderen. In 2008–2010, Mylène played in the musical Joseph and The Amazing Technicolor Dreamcoat as Maria and Naomi, and in 2011 together with Rosanne in the children's ensemble of Droomvlucht de Musical. In 2012/2013, she played the role of Little Fiona in Shrek de musical. Rosanne had her first role together with Mylène in 2011–2012 in the musical Droomvlucht. After this in 2012–2013 season, a bigger role as the blind Nelly in Dik Trom followed.

Mylène and Rosanne were chosen to announce the Dutch votes at the Junior Eurovision Song Contest 2014 in Malta.

== Discography ==
=== Singles ===
Year	Title	English translation	Album
2013	"Double Me"	—	Non-album singles
2013	"We are the Future"	—	Non-album singles
2014	"Me & My Selfie"	—	Non-album singles
2015	"MooiBoy"	Pretty boy	Non-album singles
2016	"1,000 Mooie Wensen"	1,000 beautiful wishes	Non-album singles
2017	"Sister BFF"	—	Non-album singles
2018	"Summer Vibes"	—	Non-album singles
2020	"Twinty Twinty"		Non-album singles

Awards and achievements
Preceded by Femke with "Tik Tak Tik"	Netherlands in the Junior Eurovision Song Contest; 2013	Succeeded by Julia with "Around"
