= Junior Eurovision Song Contest 2013 =

International song competition for youth

- Be Creative

Date and venue
- Final: 30 November 2013
- Venue: Palace "Ukraine"; Kyiv, Ukraine

Organisation
- Organiser: European Broadcasting Union (EBU)
- Executive supervisor: Vladislav Yakovlev

Production
- Host broadcaster: National Television Company of Ukraine (NTU)
- Director: Sven Stojanovic
- Executive producer: Victoria Romanova
- Presenters: Timur Miroshnychenko, Zlata Ognevich

Participants
- Number of entries: 12
- Debuting countries: San Marino
- Returning countries: Macedonia; Malta
- Non-returning countries: Albania; Belgium; Israel
- Participation map: Competing countries Countries that participated in the past but not in 2013

Vote
- Voting system: Each country awards 12, 10, 8–1 points to their 10 favourite songs.
- Winning song: Malta "The Start"

The Junior Eurovision Song Contest 2013 was the 11th edition of the Junior Eurovision Song Contest, held on 30 November 2013 at the Palace "Ukraine" in Kyiv, Ukraine, and presented by Timur Miroshnychenko and Zlata Ognevich. It was organised by the European Broadcasting Union (EBU) and host broadcaster the National Television Company of Ukraine (NTU). It was the second time the contest was held in Kyiv, the first being the 2009 contest. It was also the second time in the history of the Junior Eurovision Song Contest that the event was hosted by the previous year's winning broadcaster, as well as the first time that the event was held in the same city twice. The venue for the contest was announced on 17 April 2013.

Broadcasters from a total of twelve countries participated, with Macedonia and Malta making a return, and Albania, Belgium and Israel choosing to withdraw. San Marino made their debut in the contest. Cyprus was originally the thirteenth country to take part but pulled out the last minute.

The winner was Malta with the song "The Start" by Gaia Cauchi. This was Malta's first Junior Eurovision victory as well as their first victory in any Eurovision competition. It also marked the first time in the history of the contest that a winning entry was sung entirely in English. This was also the first contest to introduce a new awards system: The winning country along with the second and third place countries each received a trophy. Sofia Tarasova, representing the host nation Ukraine, took second place and Ilya Volkov singing for Belarus took the third-place trophy.

== Location ==
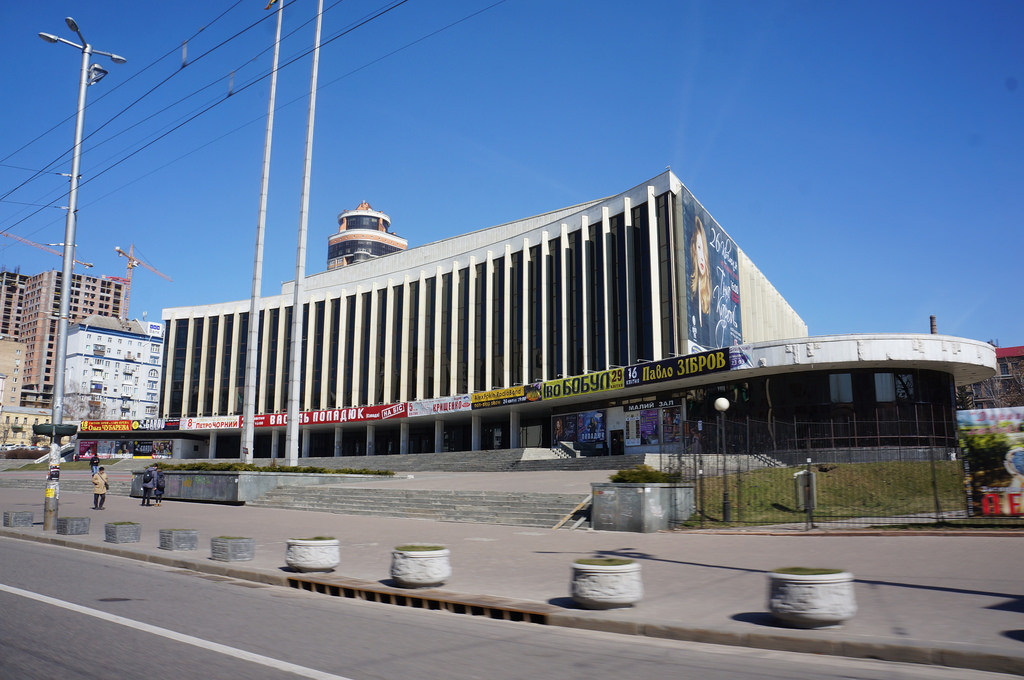
Palace "Ukraine", in Kyiv. Venue for the 2013 Junior Eurovision.

The European Broadcasting Union invited broadcasters to bid for the rights to host the contest. On 12 February 2013, the Ukrainian national broadcaster NTU and EBU announced that the 2013 contest would take place in Kyiv. Palace "Ukraine" was confirmed as the host venue on 17 April. The venue which is also known as the Ukrainian National Palace of Arts, better known as Palace "Ukraine" which is a venue administered by the State Directory of Affairs inside their public enterprises division and is one of the main venues for official events along with Palace of Sports in Kyiv, Ukraine, which hosted the 2009 contest.

It was opened in 1970 as the biggest centre of culture and arts. The building was designed by a group of architects P. Zhylytskyi, I. Vayner, under the directorship of the project's author the distinguished architect of Ukrainian SSR Yevhenia Marychenko. All of the architects were awarded Shevchenko National Prize (1971) for its design and construction. The building is trapezoidal, twenty eight meters tall and consists of over 300 rooms.

== Participants ==
Cover art of the official album

On 4 November 2013, it was confirmed that twelve countries would be taking part in the contest. Prior to that, in October, it was announced that the executive supervisor managed to maintain the participation of thirteen countries for the contest in Kyiv, Ukraine. The name of the thirteenth country was expected to be announced by the European Broadcasting Union on 29 October 2013. It was later confirmed on 1 November 2013 that Cyprus were going to be the thirteenth country but withdrew at the last minute.

This was the lowest number of entries since 2009, equalling the number of participants in 2012. San Marino made their debut, Macedonia returned after a one-year absence and Malta returned after a two-year absence. Albania and Israel withdrew after debuting in the 2012 edition, while Belgium withdrew for the first time since 2003.

Prior to the event, a digital compilation album featuring all the songs from the 2013 contest, along with karaoke versions, was put together by the European Broadcasting Union and released by Universal Music Group on 22 November 2013.

Participants of the Junior Eurovision Song Contest 2013
Country	Broadcaster	Artist	Song	Language	Songwriter(s)
Armenia	AMPTV	Monika	"Choco Factory"	Armenian, English	Emma Asatryan; Monika Avanesyan
Azerbaijan	İTV	Rustam Karimov	"Me and My Guitar"	Azerbaijani, English	Dmitry Saratsky
Belarus	BTRC	Ilya Volkov	"Poy so mnoy" (Пой со мной)	Russian	Valery Shmat; Ilya Volkov
Georgia	GPB	The Smile Shop	"Give Me Your Smile"	Georgian, English	Giorgi Kukhianidze; The Smile Shop
Macedonia	MRT	Barbara Popović	"Ohrid i muzika" (Охрид и музика)	Macedonian	Barbara Popović
Malta	PBS	Gaia Cauchi	"The Start"	English	Gillian Attard; Gaia Cauchi; Matt "Muxu" Mercieca; Elton Zarb
Moldova	TRM	Rafael Bobeica	"Cum să fim"	Romanian, English	Eugen Doibani
Netherlands	AVRO	Mylène and Rosanne	"Double Me"	Dutch, English	Tjeerd P. Oosterhuis; Mylène Waalewijn; Rosanne Waalewijn
Russia	VGTRK	Dayana Kirillova	"Dream On"	Russian	Dayana Kirillova
San Marino	SMRTV	Michele Perniola	"O-o-O Sole intorno a me"	Italian	Antonio Carozza; Massimiliano Messieri; Michele Perniola; Piero Romitelli
Sweden	SVT	Eliias	"Det är dit vi ska"	Swedish	Elias Elffors Elfström
Ukraine	NTU	Sofia Tarasova	"We Are One"	Ukrainian, English	Yevgeny Matyushenko; Michael Nekrasov; Sofia Tarasova

=== Returning artists ===
Even though the rules of Junior Eurovision at the time did not allow participation of returning artists, Ilya Volkov of Belarus was a dancer for Egor Zheshko in 2012.

== Format ==
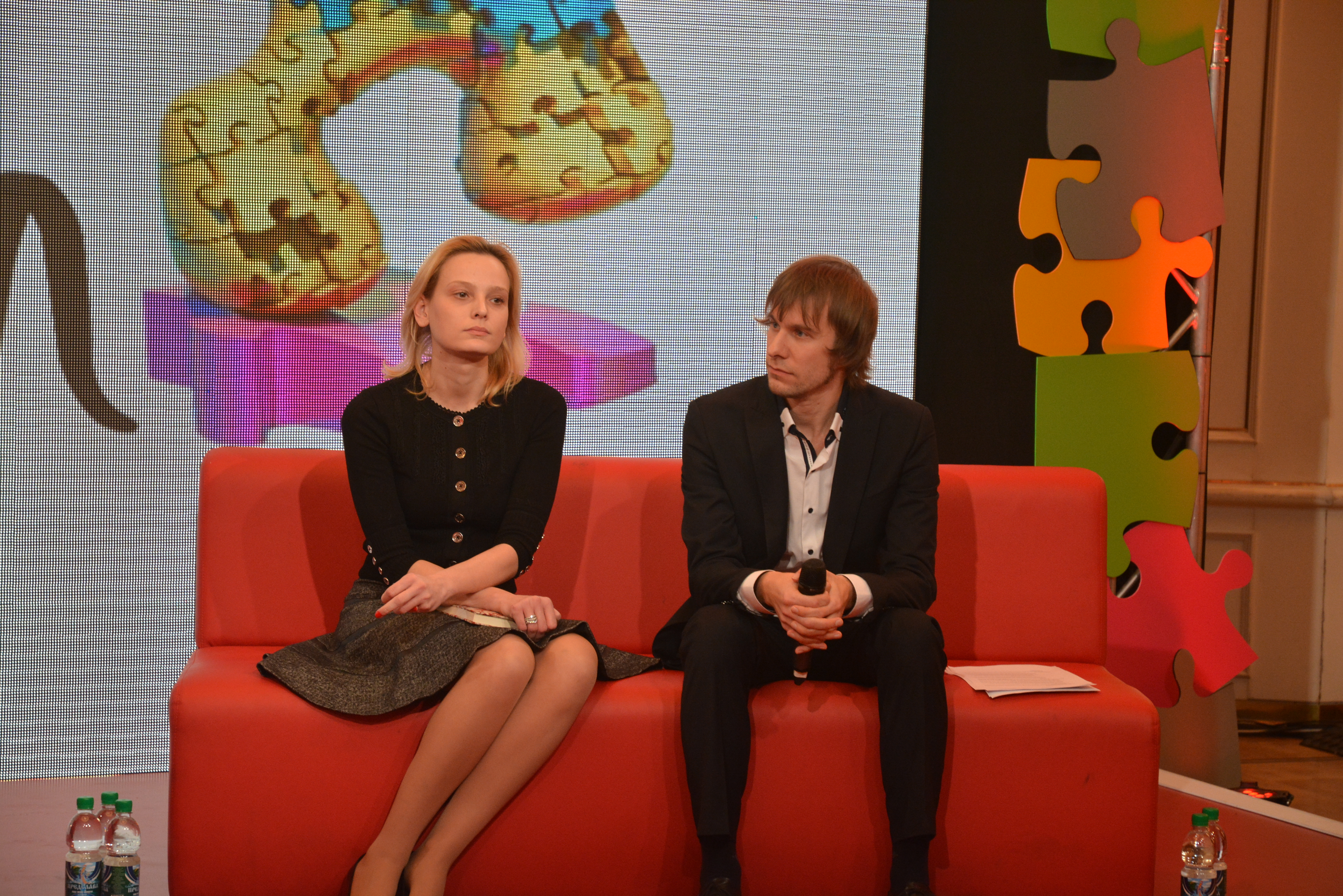
Victoria Romanova (executive producer), Vladislav Yakovlev (EBU Executive Supervisor)

The executive supervisor of the Junior Eurovision steering group, Vladislav Yakovlev, announced on 17 July 2013 that there would be some changes being introduced to the contest from 2013 onwards. The contest would no longer focus on just the winning entry, but would also award prizes to the top three entries in acknowledgement of the talents of the young performers.

It was also announced that the winner of Junior Eurovision 2013 would be at the Eurovision Song Contest 2014, however the role that they would play had not been revealed at that time.

The running order draw took place on 25 November 2013 during the contest's opening party.

=== Graphic design ===
Designer Elias Ledakis, who was responsible for the stage design of the Eurovision Song Contest 2006 in Athens, Greece, was announced on 7 October 2013 as also being the designer for the 2013 Junior Eurovision stage.

=== Radio broadcast ===
The official Junior Eurovision Twitter account revealed on 9 October that the contest was planned to be broadcast online and by national broadcasters, however the details were still being worked on. On 21 November 2013, it was revealed that 98.8 Castle FM in Scotland would be the only radio station broadcasting the ceremony in the United Kingdom. Radio Ukraine International would also be broadcasting the contest live.

=== Hosts ===
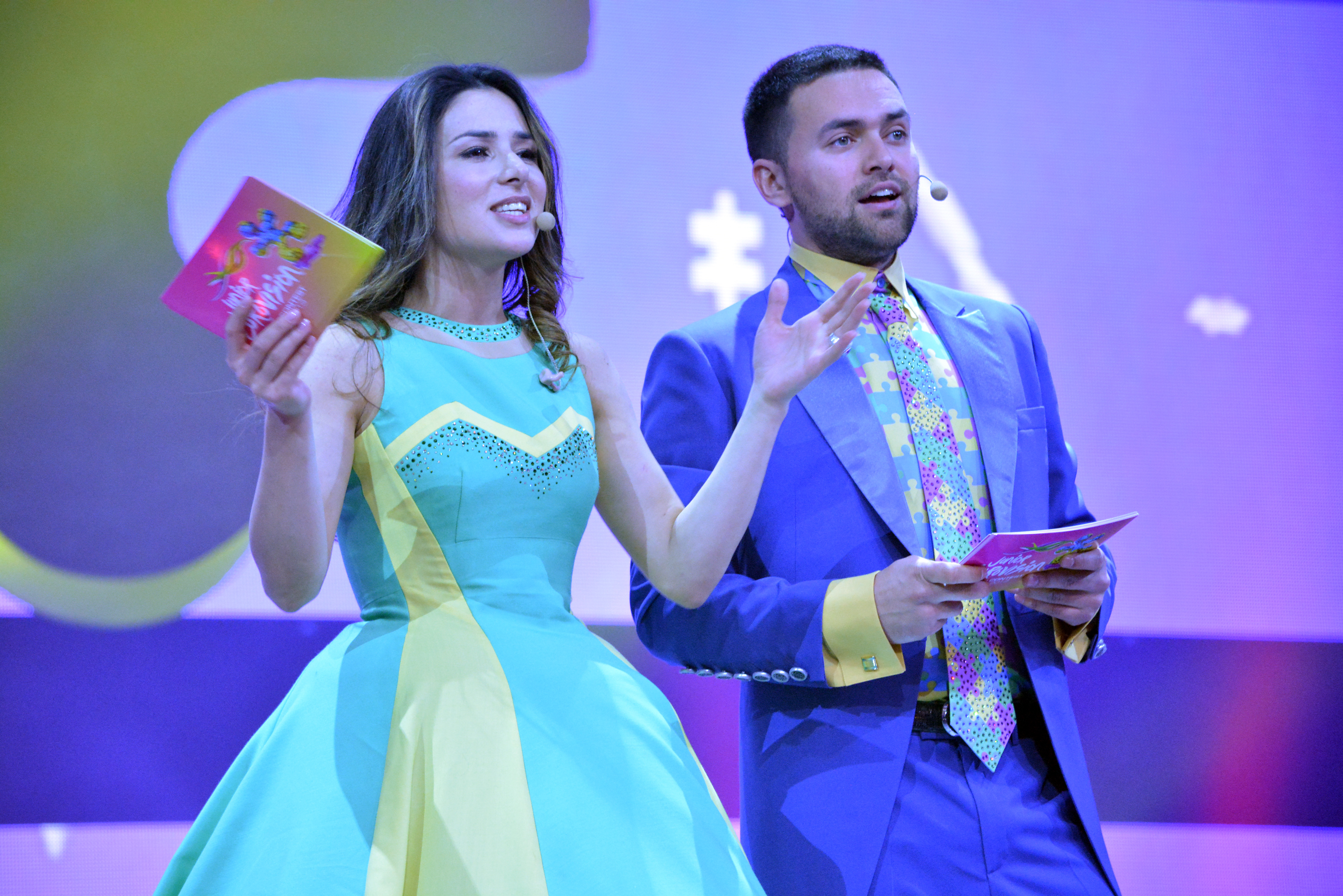
Presenters from left to right: Zlata Ognevich and Timur Miroshnychenko

On 30 September 2013, it was confirmed that Timur Miroshnychenko would host the contest alongside Zlata Ognevich.

== Contest overview ==
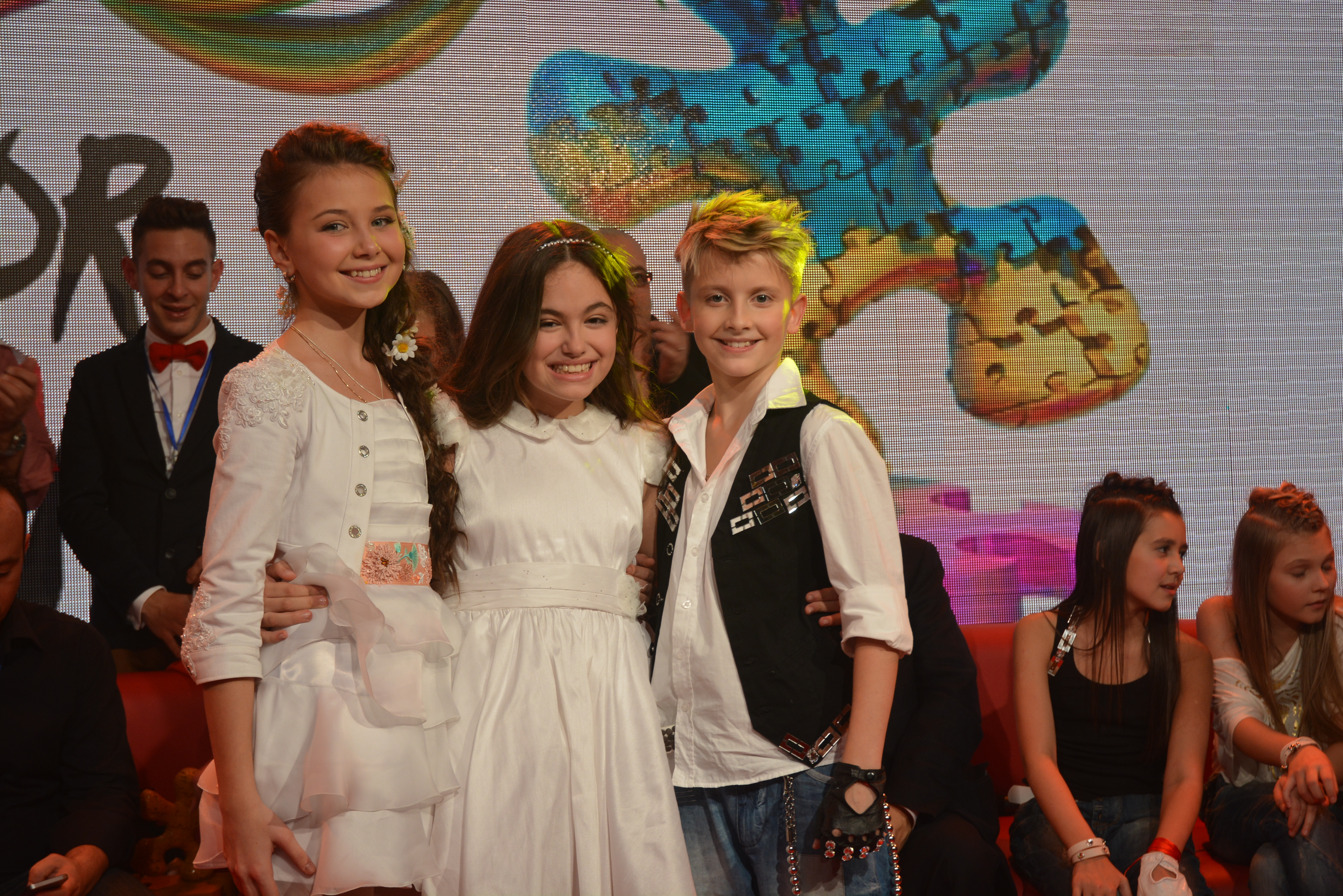
The top three of Junior Eurovision Song Contest 2013: Sofia Tarasova (Ukraine), Gaia Cauchi (Malta), and Ilya Volkov (Belarus)

The event took place on 30 November 2013 at 20:00 EET (19:00 CET). Twelve countries participated, with the running order published on 25 November 2013. All the countries competing were eligible to vote with the jury and televote, as well as a Kids Jury, eligible to vote. Malta won with 130 points, with Ukraine and Belarus completing the top three. San Marino, Moldova, and Macedonia occupied the bottom three positions.

The show began with two children, Andriy Boiko and Liza Kostiakina, doing a puzzle of this year’s logo, Puzzle Man. The opening number featured several fairytale scenes with dancers and musicians on the stage, with LED screens and movable parts and puzzle pieces floating above the stage also featured. The interval included Eurovision 2013 winner Emmelie de Forest performing "Only Teardrops", all participants performing the theme song "Be Creative", last year's winner Anastasiya Petryk and Zlata Ognevich also performed on stage. Some hours before the start of the contest Ruslana withdrew from performing at the event, motivated by the violent actions of the Ukrainian authorities against the pro-European Union protests that were happening near the contest's venue.

R/O	Country	Artist	Song	Points	Place
1	Sweden	Eliias	"Det är dit vi ska"	46	9
2	Azerbaijan	Rustam Karimov	"Me and My Guitar"	66	7
3	Armenia	Monika	"Choco Factory"	69	6
4	San Marino	Michele Perniola	"O-o-O Sole intorno a me"	42	10
5	Macedonia	Barbara Popović	"Ohrid i muzika"	19	12
6	Ukraine	Sofia Tarasova	"We Are One"	121	2
7	Belarus	Ilya Volkov	"Poy so mnoy"	108	3
8	Moldova	Rafael Bobeica	"Cum să fim"	41	11
9	Georgia	The Smile Shop	"Give Me Your Smile"	91	5
10	Netherlands	Mylène and Rosanne	"Double Me"	59	8
11	Malta	Gaia Cauchi	"The Start"	130	1
12	Russia	Dayana Kirillova	"Dream On"	106	4

=== Spokespersons ===
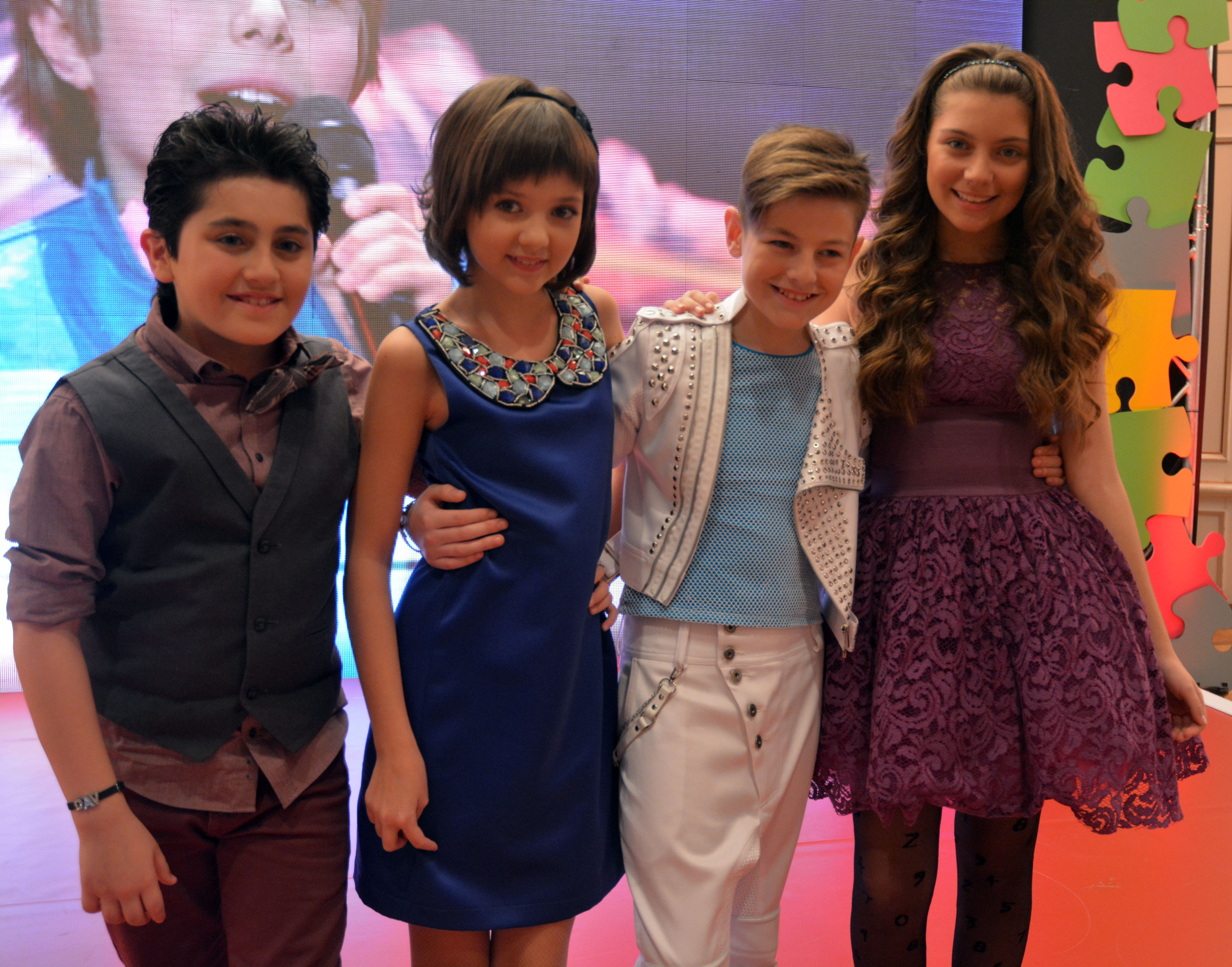
Some spokespersons from the 2013 edition: David Vardanyan (Armenia), Mariya Bakhireva (Russia), Denis Midone (Moldova), and Maxine Pace (Malta)

The order in which each country announced their votes was in the order of performance. The running order draw took place on 25 November 2013 during the contest's opening party. The spokespersons from all of the participating countries are shown below alongside their respective country.

1. Kids Jury – Anastasiya Petryk
2. Sweden – Lova Sönnerbo
3. Azerbaijan – Lyaman Mirzalieva
4. Armenia – David Vardanyan
5. San Marino – Giovanni
6. Macedonia – Sofija Spasenoska
7. Ukraine – Liza Arfush
8. Belarus – Sasha Tkach
9. Moldova – Denis Midone
10. Georgia – Elene Megrelishvili
11. Netherlands – Alessandro Wempe
12. Malta – Maxine Pace
13. Russia – Mariya Bakhireva

== Detailed voting results ==
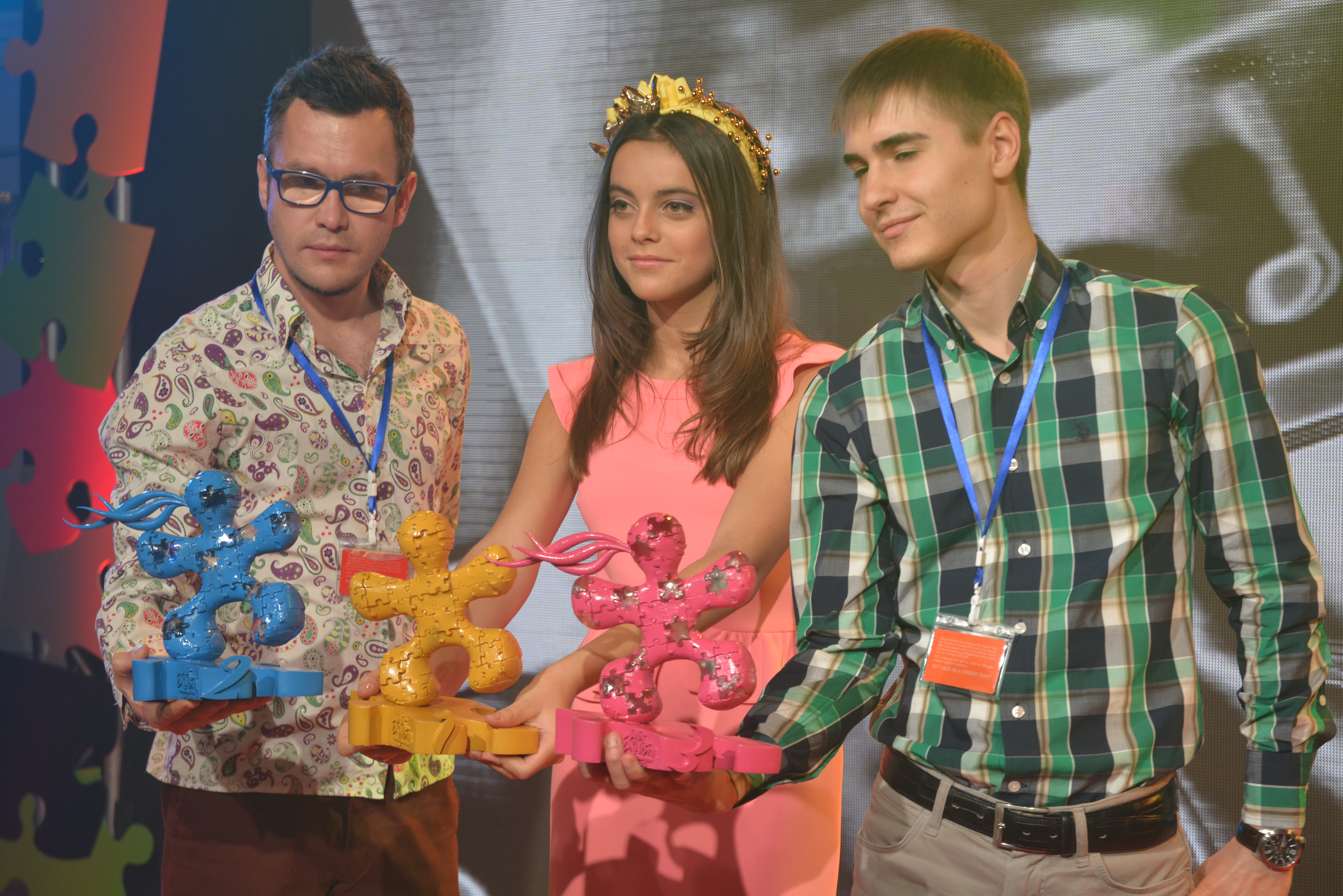
The trophies for the top three winners of the Junior Eurovision Song Contest 2013 with official mascot "Puzzle-Man"

Detailed voting results
		Total score	Kids Jury	Sweden	Azerbaijan	Armenia	San Marino	Macedonia	Ukraine	Belarus	Moldova	Georgia	Netherlands	Malta	Russia
Contestants	Sweden	46	1		4	3	5	1	2	5	6	1	4		2
Contestants	Azerbaijan	66	4	7			2	2	10		3	10	3	6	7
Contestants	Armenia	69	3	4			4	4	5	2	4	12	6	8	5
Contestants	San Marino	42	5	2	2	4			1	3	2	3	2	2	4
Contestants	Macedonia	19		1	1	2				1			1	1	
Contestants	Ukraine	121	8	10	10	8	12	8		12	7	7	7	12	8
Contestants	Belarus	108	10	5	6	6	6	7	8		10	8	8	10	12
Contestants	Moldova	41		3	3	1	3	3	3	4		4		4	1
Contestants	Georgia	91	7		8	7	10	10	6	7	8		5	5	6
Contestants	Netherlands	59	2	6	5	5	1	5	4	6	1	2		7	3
Contestants	Malta	130	12	8	7	10	7	12	12	10	12	6	12		10
Contestants	Russia	106	6	12	12	12	8	6	7	8	5	5	10	3	

=== 12 points ===
Below is a summary of all 12 points received. All countries were given 12 points at the start of voting to ensure that no country finished with nul points.

N.	Contestant	Nation(s) giving 12 points
5	Malta	Kids Jury, Macedonia, Moldova, Netherlands, Ukraine
3	Russia	Armenia, Azerbaijan, Sweden
3	Ukraine	Belarus, Malta, San Marino
1	Armenia	Georgia
1	Belarus	Russia

== Other countries ==
- Albania – On 27 September 2013 the head of the Albanian delegation, Kleart Duraj informed ESCkaz.com that Radio Televizioni Shqiptar (RTSH) had withdrawn after making the début in the Junior Eurovision Song Contest 2012 due to not finding a suitable act to represent the nation.
- Belgium – Despite originally confirming participation, Flemish broadcaster Vlaamse Radio- en Televisieomroeporganisatie (VRT), owner of children's channel Ketnet, announced it would not participate in the 2013 contest, and instead focus on creating a new talent show for young performers in Belgium. They did, however, proceed with their national final, retitled to Wie wordt Junior?, which was won by 14-year-old Pieter Vreys.
- Bulgaria – Bulgarian broadcaster Bulgarian National Television (BNT) announced that they would not return to the contest in 2013. However, they were currently planning to return in the future.
- Cyprus – Cypriot broadcaster Cyprus Broadcasting Corporation (CyBC) were in discussions with the EBU as to being the thirteenth country in Junior Eurovision, however after a board meeting an invitation to take part was declined.
- Israel – On 21 October 2013 it was announced by EscPlus that Israel would not be taking part in the 2013 contest.
- Latvia – An announcement was made by Latvian broadcaster Latvijas Televīzija (LTV) that they would not return to the 2013 contest.
- Portugal – Portuguese broadcaster Rádio e Televisão de Portugal (RTP) announced that they would not return to contest in 2013, due to the realisation of the Little Singers Gala in Figueira da Foz.
- Spain – Yago Fandiño, director of children's programs of TVE stated on 7 September 2013 that TVE and the EBU were negotiating its return. Fandiño explained that since the EBU has redesigned the format of the Junior Eurovision Song Contest, TVE would check if the initiatives make into a format more suitable for the younger audience. If so, the country would have probably returned to the competition.

== Broadcasts ==
Most countries sent commentators to Kyiv or commentated from their own country, to add insight to the participants and, if necessary, provide voting information. For the first time, the official Junior Eurovision website featured commentary online during the broadcast with commentary from the website's editor Luke Fisher and radio broadcaster Ewan Spence.

Broadcasters and commentators in participating countries
Country	Broadcaster(s)	Channel(s)	Commentator(s)	Ref.
Armenia	ARMTV	Armenia 1	Dalita and Vahe Khanamiryan	
Azerbaijan	İTV		Konul Arifgizi	
Belarus	BTRC	Belarus 1, Belarus 24	Anatoliy Lipetskiy	
Georgia	GPB	1TV	Natia Bunturi and Giorgi Grdzelishvili	
Macedonia	MRT	MRT 1	Tina Teutovic and Spasija Veljanoska	
Malta	PBS	TVM	Corazon Mizzi and Daniel Chircop	
Moldova	TRM	Moldova 1	Rusalina Rusu	
Netherlands	AVRO	Nederlands 3	Marcel Kuijer	
Russia	C1R, VGTRK	Carousel	Alexander Gurevich	
San Marino	SMRTV	San Marino RTV	Lia Fiorio and Gilberto Gattei	
Sweden	SVT	SVT Barnkanalen	Ylva Hällen and Edward af Sillén	
Ukraine	NTU	Pershyi	Tetyana Terekhova	
Ukraine	Radio Ukraine International	UR-1	Olena Zelinchenko, Valerij Kirichenko, Anastasia Jablonskaja	

Broadcasters and commentators in non-participating countries
Country	Broadcaster(s)	Channel(s)	Commentator(s)	Ref.
Australia	SBS	SBS Two (1 December 2013)	Andre Nookadu and Georgia McCarthy	
Greece	Dimosia Tileorasi	DT	Unknown	
Kosovo	RTK	RTK 1	Unknown	
United Kingdom	98.8 Castle FM		Ewan Spence and Luke Fisher	

== See also ==
- ABU TV Song Festival 2013
- Eurovision Song Contest 2013
- Eurovision Young Dancers 2013
- Turkvision Song Contest 2013
