= San Marino in the Junior Eurovision Song Contest 2013 =

- Junior Eurovision Song Contest 2013
- Country: San Marino
- Selection process: Internal Selection

Competing entry
- Song: "O-o-O Sole intorno a me"
- Artist: Michele Perniola

Placement
- Final result: 10th, 42 points

Participation chronology

San Marino debuted in the Junior Eurovision Song Contest in Kyiv, Ukraine. On 28 October 2013, it was revealed that they would debut in the Junior Eurovision Song Contest 2013. The country used their internal selection to select the artist and the song. Michele Perniola was selected as the representative for San Marino with the song "O-o-O Sole intorno a me".

== Internal selection ==
On 28 October 2013, it was revealed that the chosen representative for San Marino was Michele Perniola with the song "O-o-O Sole intorno a me".

== Song ==
=== O-o-O Sole intorno a me ===
His song "O-o-O Sole intorno a me" was composed by Antonello Carozza and Massimiliano Messieri, and the lyricists were Michele Perniola, Piero Romitelli, and Antonello Carozza.

== At Junior Eurovision ==
At the running order draw which took place on 25 November 2013, San Marino were drawn to perform fourth, following Armenia and preceding North Macedonia.

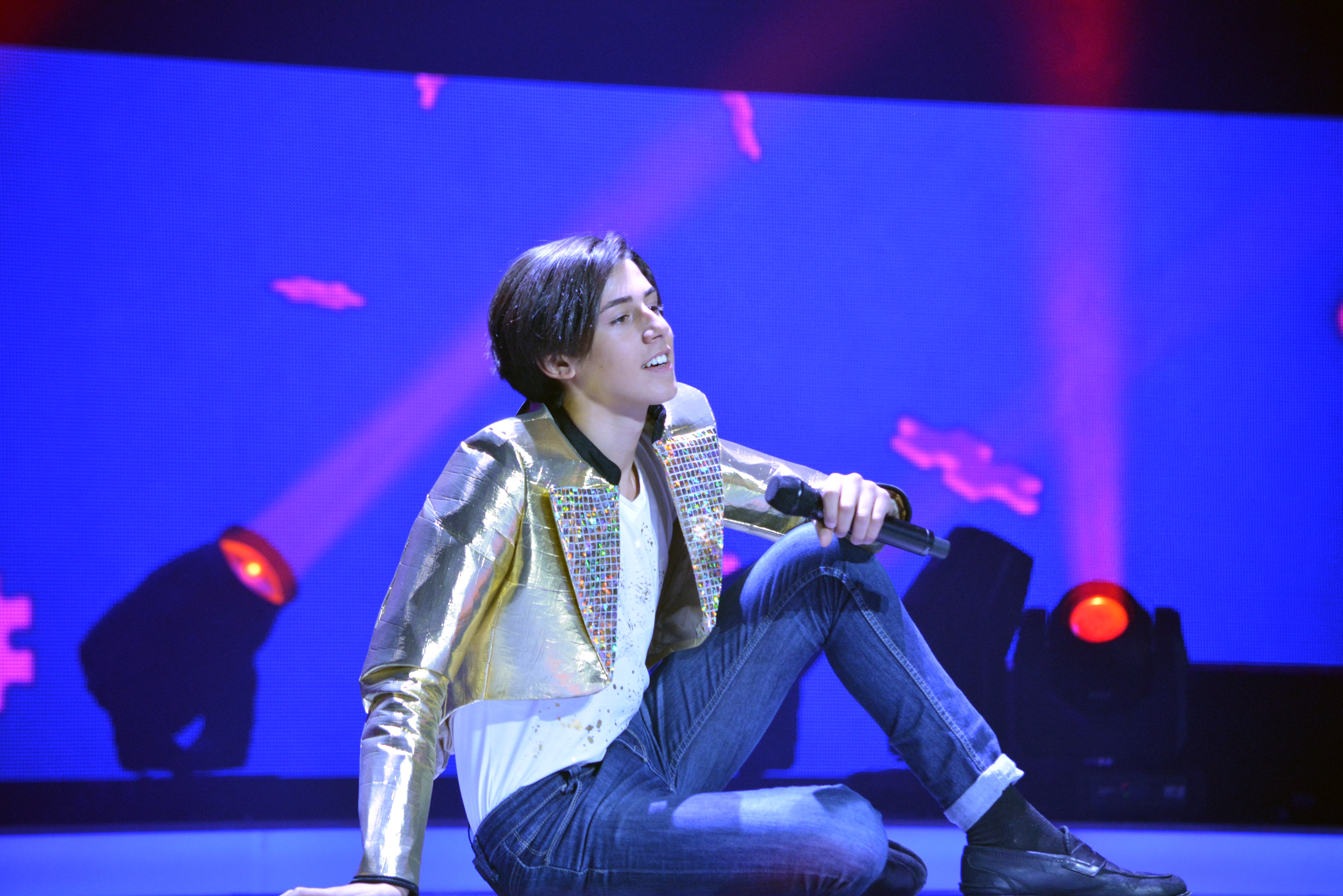
Michele Perniola at his second rehearsal

He finished in 10th out of 12 songs, receiving 42 points.

=== Voting ===
Points awarded to San Marino
Score	Country
12 points (Note: All countries received one set of 12 points to ensure no country finished with nul points.)	
10 points	
8 points	
7 points	
6 points	
5 points	
4 points	Armenia
3 points	Russia
2 points	Georgia
1 point	Azerbaijan

Points awarded by San Marino
Score	Country
12 points	Malta
10 points	Armenia
8 points	Russia
7 points	Georgia
6 points	Ukraine
5 points	Azerbaijan
4 points	Netherlands
3 points	Belarus
2 points	Moldova
1 point	Sweden
