= Dayana Kirillova =

Russian singer (born 2002)

Dayana Kirillova Дая́на Кири́ллова
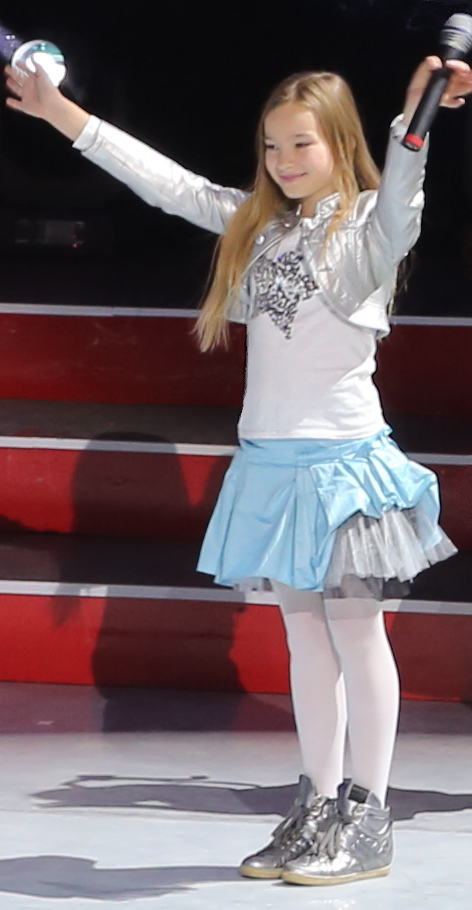
- Kirillova in 2013

Background information
- Born: 16 April 2002 (age 24); Kazan, Russia
- Genres: Pop
- Occupation: Singer
- Instrument: Vocals
- Years active: 2006–present
- Website: www.dayanakirillova.ru

Dayana Yurievna Kirillova (Russian: Дая́на Юрьевна Кири́ллова, IPA: [dɐˈjanə kʲɪˈrʲiləvə]; born 16 April 2002) is a Russian singer. She is a multiple laureate of Russian and international song contests, the Russian representative at the 2013 Slavianski Bazaar (children's competition), and the Russian representative at the 2013 Junior Eurovision which took place on 30 November in Kyiv.

== Biography ==
Dayana was born on 16 April 2002, in Kazan, Tatarstan, Russia where she still lives with her parents. She received her unusual name because her parents thought she was going to be a boy and had picked out the boy's name of Danil.

When Dayana was four, her grandmother brought her to an audition at a nearby recreational center. At the audition, the teachers said that Dayana was tone deaf and had no voice, but let her attend if she wanted. Ever since, for over six years as of 2013, Dayana has been studying in the vocal class of Eleanora Kalashnikova. At the age of four, Dayana already debuted on stage.

Dayana performs both solo and as a member of a vocal trio named Barbie Cocktail. Since 2012, Dayana attends a dance studio belonging to the Todes^{(ru)} network.

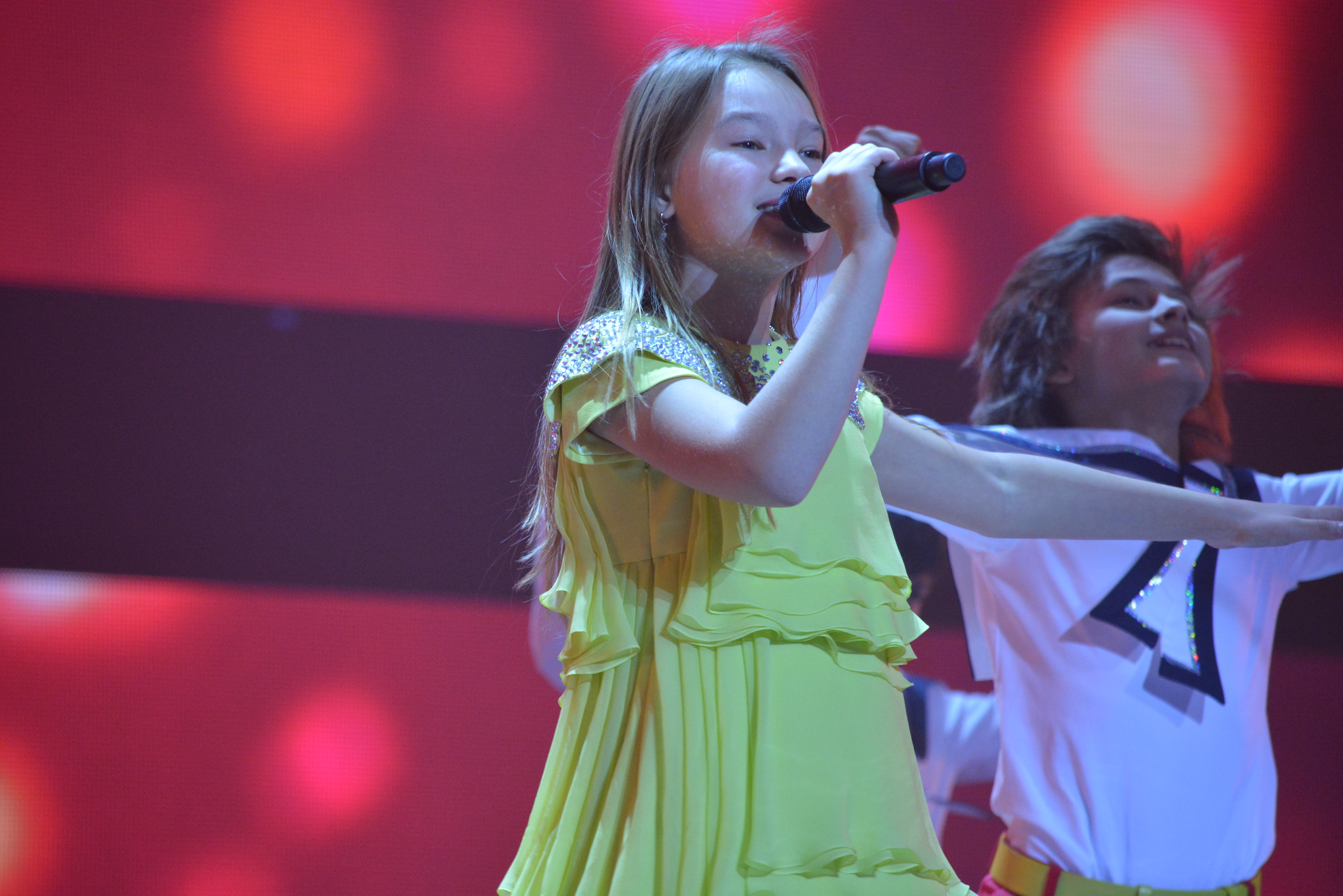
Dayana Kirillova at the dress rehearsal for the Junior Eurovision Song Contest 2013

In 2012, Dayana placed second in the Russian national final for that year's Junior Eurovision, missing the first place by two points. The next year, she won the selection with the song "Mechtay". She will represent her country at the Junior Eurovision Song Contest 2013 with the song "Dream On". Earlier in 2013 she was selected to represent Russia in the children's contest of the 2013 Slavianski Bazaar, on which she also missed out by one point in the final audition in 2012. At Slavianski Bazaar she shared third place with Galina Dubok from Ukraine.

== Performing style and repertoire ==
Dayana's teacher Eleanora Kalashnikova's praises her vocal range and stage ability. According to her, Dayana likes performing on stage, she comports herself on stage like "a grown-up" and performing in front of a large audience is a "sheer pleasure for her".

The singer's repertoire mostly consists of songs written specially for her by Eleonora Kalashnikova. As the teacher explains, "songs from cartoons don't suit her voice anymore", so she composes songs especially for Dayana.

Awards and achievements
Preceded by Lerika with "sensation"	Russia in the Junior Eurovision Song Contest; 2013	Succeeded by Alisa Kozhikina with "Dreamer"
