= Ilya Volkov =

Belarusian singer/dancer (born 2002)

Ilya Volkov Ілля Волкаў
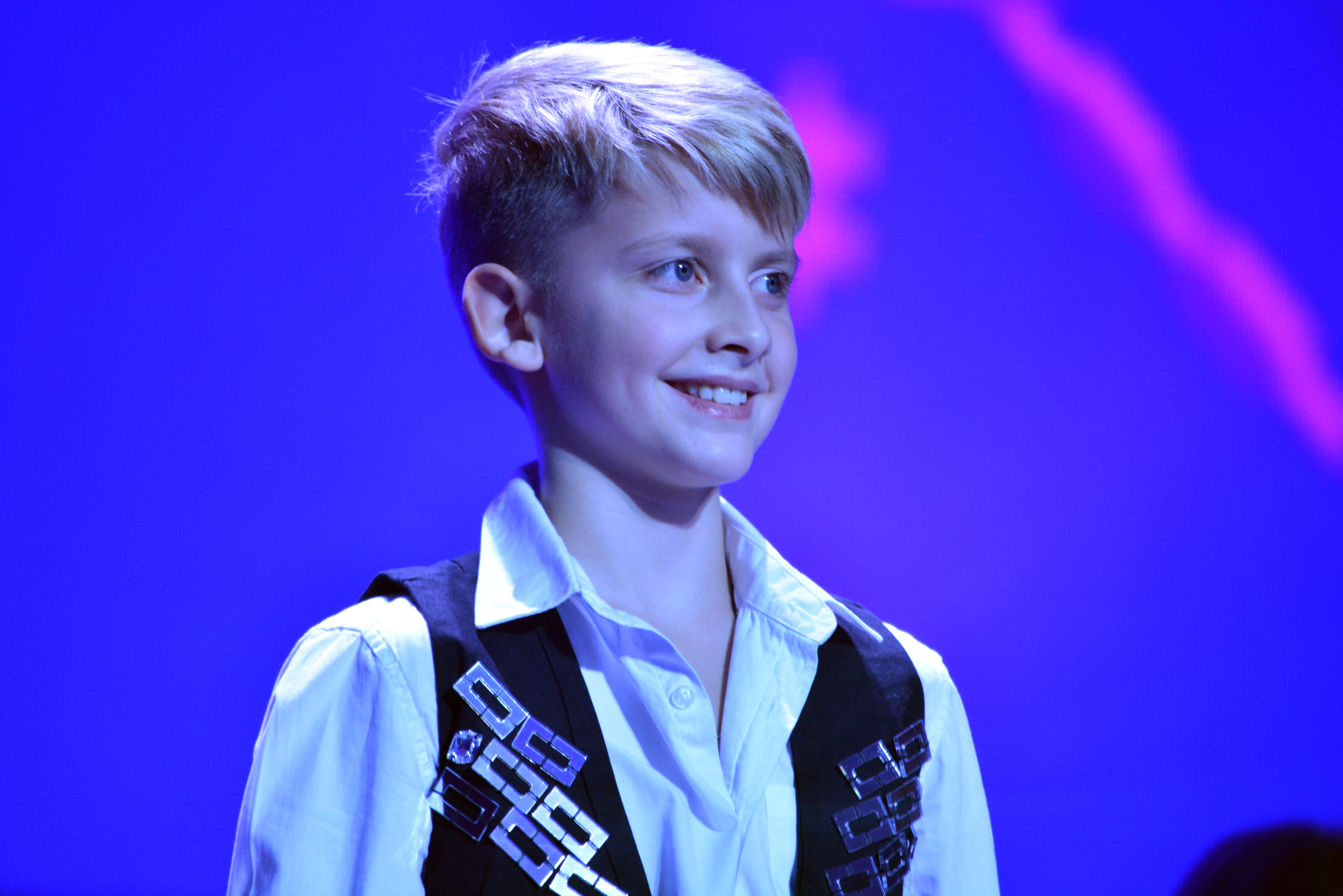
- Volkov in 2013

Background information
- Born: Ілля Волкаў; 19 April 2002 (age 24); Minsk, Belarus
- Origin: Belarus
- Genres: Pop, dance, Europop
- Occupations: Singer, songwriter, dancer
- Instruments: Vocals, piano
- Years active: 2008-present
- Website: www.ilyavolkov.hys.cz

Ilya Volkov (Russian: Илья Волков, Romanized: Ilya Volkov; Belarusian: Ілля Волкаў, Romanized: Illia Volkaŭ; born 19 April 2002) is a Belarusian teen singer and part-time dancer. He is best known for representing his country at the 11th annual Junior Eurovision Song Contest with his song Poy so Mnoy (Sing with me).

== Life and career ==
Ilya Volkov was born on 19 April 2002 in Minsk, the capital city of Belarus.

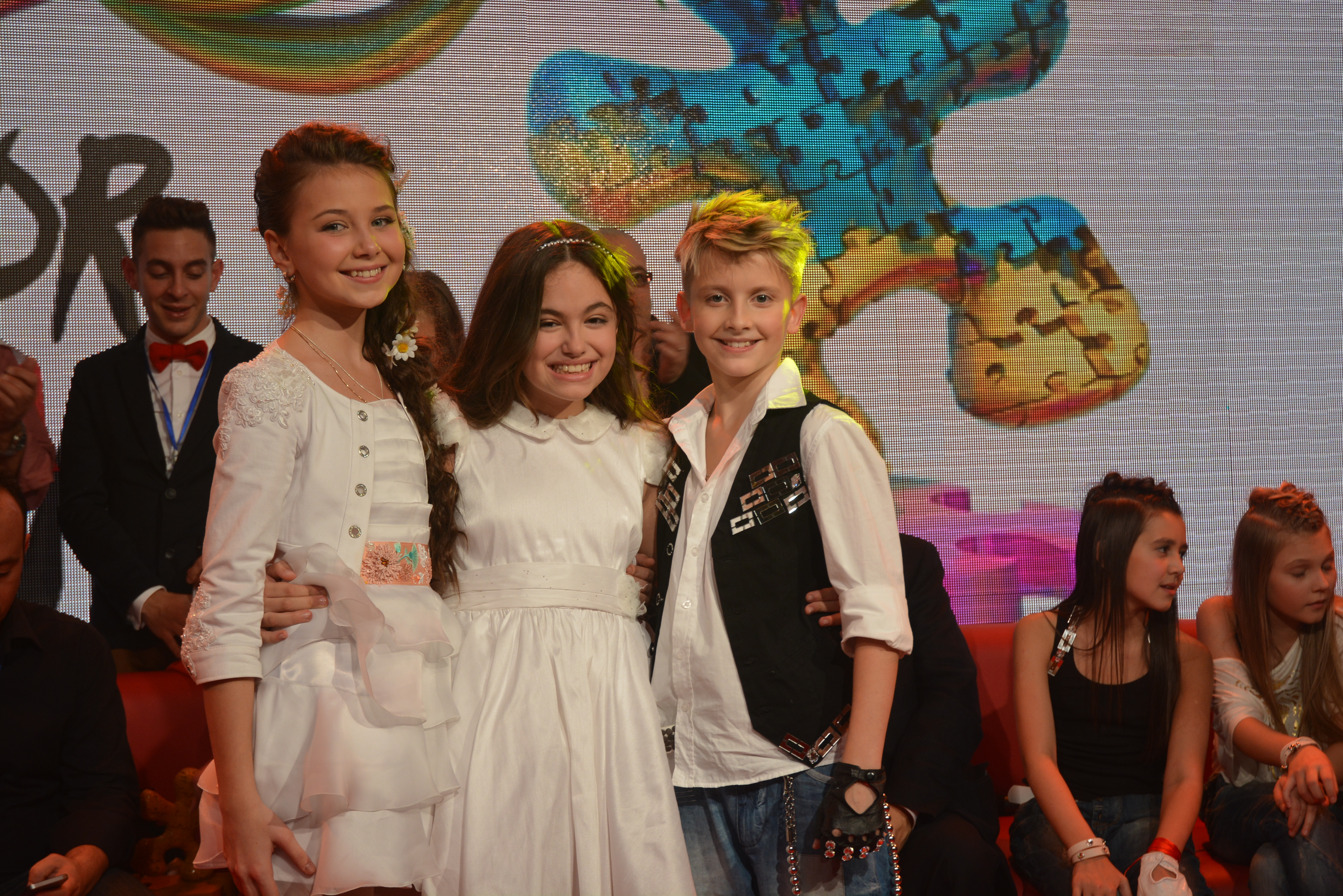
Ilya Volkov (right) with Gaia Cauchi (middle) and Sofia Tarasova (left) of the Junior Eurovision Song Contest 2013

== Junior Eurovision Song Contest 2013 ==
On 4 October 2013, Ilya Volkov went on to win the Belarusian selection for JESC with his song "Poy so Mnoy". A few weeks later, Volkov shot a video for the song. On 30 November 2013, he represented Belarus at the 11th Junior Eurovision Song Contest in Kyiv, Ukraine. "Poy so Mnoy" placed third in a field of 12 songs with 108 points, receiving 12 points from Russia.

== Discography ==
=== Singles ===
Year	Title	English translation	Album
2013	"Poy so Mnoy"	Sing with me	Non-album single(s)
2014	"With You"	—	Non-album single(s)

Awards and achievements
Preceded by Egor Zheshko with A More-More	Belarus in the Junior Eurovision Song Contest; 2013	Succeeded by Nadezhda Misyakova with Sokal
