= We Are One (Sofia Tarasova song) =

2013 song performed by Sofia Tarasova

Single by Sofia Tarasova
- Released: October 2013
- Recorded: Early September 2013
- Genre: Pop, electronic
- Length: 2:59
- Songwriter: Sofia Tarasova

Sofia Tarasova singles chronology
| "Zhityeviy pazl" (2012) | "We Are One" (2013) | "Zminyty vse" (2013) |

Junior Eurovision Song Contest 2013 entry
- Country: Ukraine
- Artist: Sofia Tarasova
- Languages: Ukrainian, English
- Composer: Sofia Tarasova
- Lyricist: Sofia Tarasova

Finals performance
- Final result: 2nd
- Final points: 121

Entry chronology
- ◄ "Nebo" (2012)
- "Pryyde vesna" (2014) ►

"We Are One" is a song by Ukrainian singer Sofia Tarasova. It represented Ukraine at the Junior Eurovision Song Contest 2013 hosted in Kyiv, Ukraine.

== Performances ==
=== National final ===
On 2 August 2013, Sofia Tarasova took part in the national selection for Ukraine. Tarasova performed 19th in a field of 20 candidates, and won the selection altogether. Despite only coming 11th in the jury voting, the judges agreed that she would represent the nation at the actual contest. For her performance in the selection, Tarasova had a headset microphone and was accompanied by a female backup singer.

=== Junior Eurovision 2013 ===
Tarasova's performance of "We Are One" was different than her performance from the national final. For Kyiv, Tarasova decided that there would be no backup performers with her, because she believed that it "would distract the viewers." Also, she decided to use a handheld microphone for that night. On 30 November 2013, Tarasova performed "We Are One" at the 11th annual Junior Eurovision Song Contest on home turf. Her song placed 2nd in a field of 12 songs, with 121 points.
