= Barbara Popović =

Macedonian singer (born 2000)

Barbara Popović Барбара Поповиќ
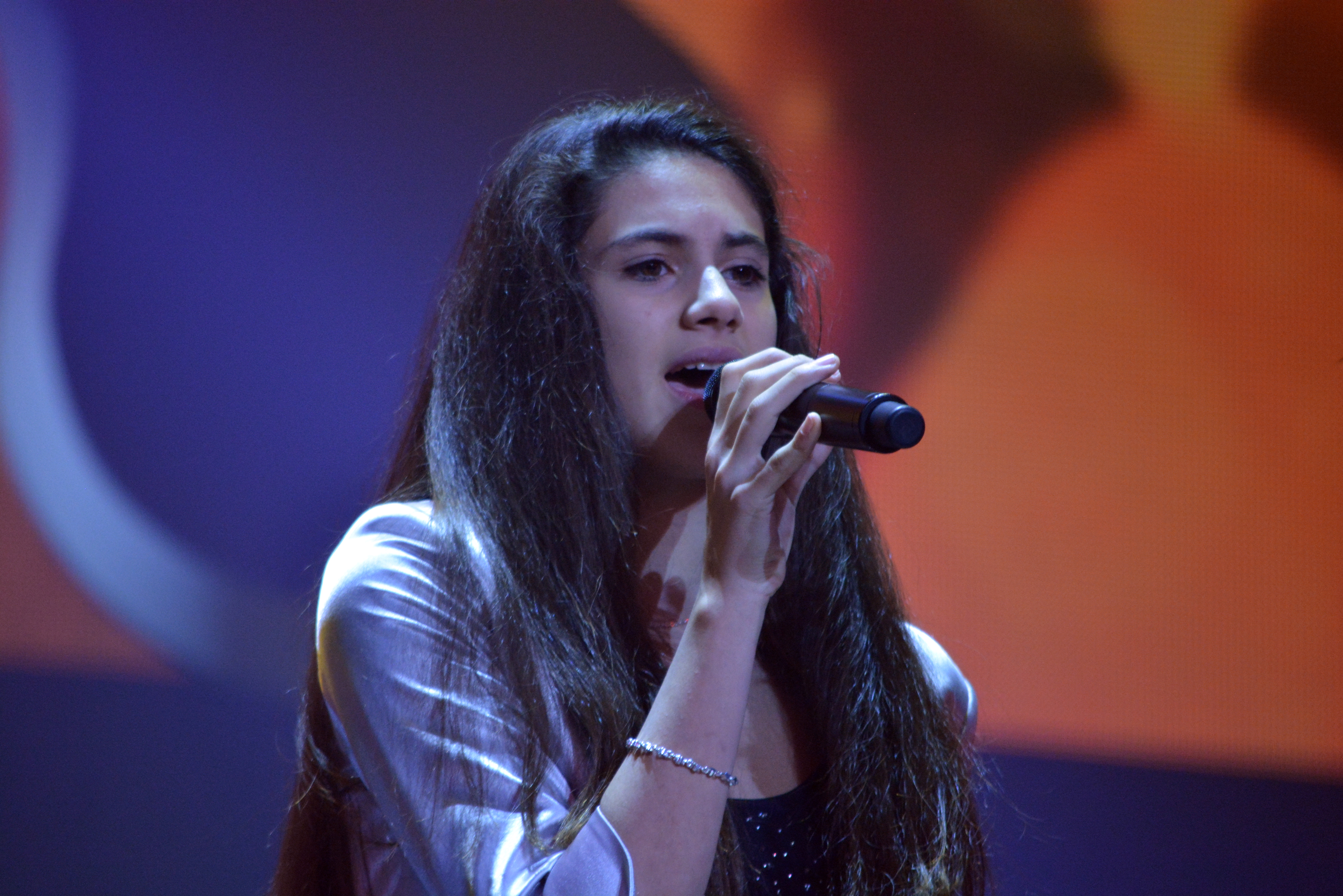
- Popović at the JESC 2013 rehearsal

Background information
- Born: 16 September 2000 (age 26); Skopje, Republic of Macedonia
- Genre: Pop
- Occupation: Singer
- Instrument: Vocals

Barbara Popović (Macedonian: Барбара Поповиќ, pronounced [ˈbarbara ˈpɔpɔvic]; born 16 September 2000), also known as simply Barbara, is a Macedonian singer. She is known for representing her country at the Junior Eurovision Song Contest 2013.

== Biography ==
Popović was born in Skopje, Republic of Macedonia (now North Macedonia) to Serbian parents, on 16 August 2000.

At the time she performed in the Junior Eurovision 2013 final, Popović was 13, but was already an experienced artist and famous in her country.

She was especially noted for her participation in the Macedonian children's music festival Super Zvezda ("Super Star"). She performed at the festival for the first time at the age of six, and continued yearly until she was ten. She had collaborated with many noted Macedonian artists, who composed for her, including Kaliopi, Jovan Jovanov, Darko Dimitrov, and Elena Risteska. Kaliopi was the one who wrote one of the songs she was most known for, "Bongiorno" ("Бонџорно").

Also, since the same age of six Popović had been studying piano in a music school, her piano teacher reportedly being "Macedonia’s most famous piano professor".

== Career ==
=== Junior Eurovision Song Contest 2013 ===
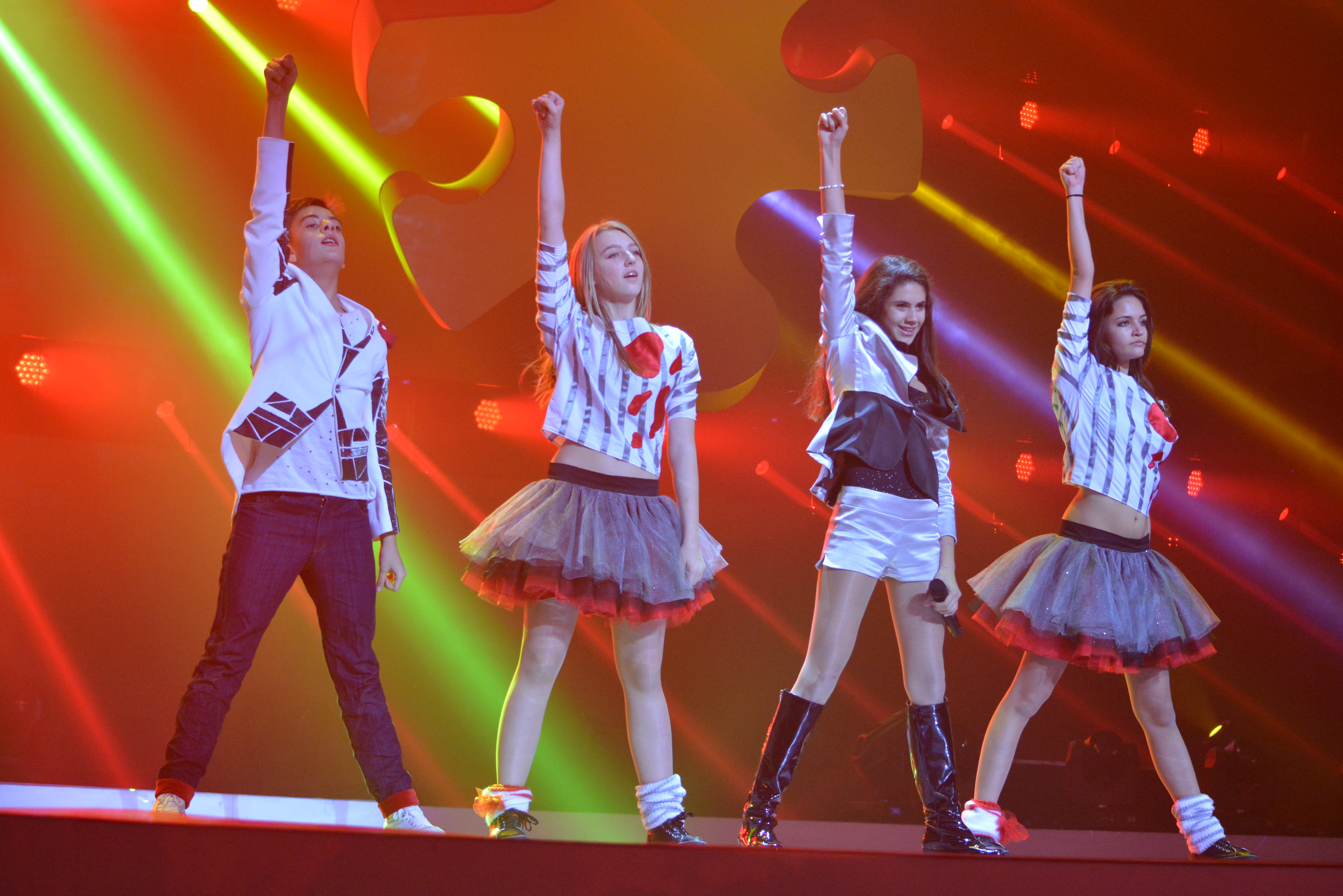
Popović and her team at rehearsal for the Junior Eurovision Song Contest 2013

In 2013, Macedonian Radio Television (MRT) decided to return to the Junior Eurovision after a two-year gap. Barbara Popović was chosen by the organizer, i.e. MRT, at an internal audition, there was no public selection process.

The song she performed at the Junior Eurovision contest was called "Ohrid i Muzika" ("Ohrid and Music"). It was written by Popović herself, with composer Kire Kostov helping with music and arrangement and Ognem Nedelkovski helping with lyrics. The song was inspired by an excursion trip to the ancient Macedonian town of Ohrid. As Popović revealed, the lyrics were dedicated to a boy from the Netherlands, and the song narrated the story of the "awakening of first love in her teenage heart". The lyrics went like this: "I speak not a single word of Dutch, but your eyes are so warm... In my homeland everybody sings and dances. Don't be silly, join us. Give me your hand, you will love this music more than love!... With this song I'm crossing borders in an instant."

On stage, Popović was accompanied by their dancers from the dance studio Eureka. One of them (the blond girl) was Sara Kastratović, 13-year-old daughter of Zoran and Indira Kastratović, coaches of the women's handball team Vardar SCBT, who did not even think to follow up her parents' profession and pursues her passion for hip hop.

According to Rede Spasovski, the chief of the Macedonian delegation, the initial reaction to Popović's rehearsals was positive.

Despite the positive expectations, in the final Macedonia placed last out of the 12 countries, with 19 points (12 of which are given to all participants at the start of the voting regardless of how well they did). Moldova, who took the penultimate place, received 41 points.

The result was dubbed "catastrophic". It was reported that Macedonian Radio Television (MRT) was "seriously considering" to withdraw from the contest in the future. The artistic director of the Macedonian Junior Eurovision team, Ljupcho Mirkovski, defended the internal decision to send Popović without holding a national selection, saying that Popović was musically talented, and attributed her bad performance to stage fright. "Internal selection may not be the best solution, but this year we 'joined the dance' a little bit too late, so there was no better solution that this. Barbara is a musical child and certainly could sing better, but stage fright has done its job. Not all children are immune to public performance," said he in an interview. He also stated that he didn not find it strange that the countries of the former Soviet Union didn't help Popović to place higher because in a song contest songs matter more than relationship between countries. As for the states of the former Yugoslavia, Macedonia was the only former Yugoslav republic competing that year.

=== 2018-2022: Comeback and releases ===
She returned to the stage at the 2018 Makfest festival, introducing a new song titled "Ne si ti kriv" ("It’s Not Your Fault").

In 2020, she released a new single titled "Mirisash", accompanied by a music video.

=== 2023: IDJ Show ===
In early September 2023, controversy surrounded Popović's rendition of the Italian national anthem before a Euro 2024 qualifying match between North Macedonia and Italy. Many Italians in attendance were displeased with the quality of Popović's performance, with the anthem being performed a cappella and with Macedonian supporters booing it from start to finish; many expressed their displeasure on social networks. This, combined with a disappointing result for Italy (1:1), led some Italians to dub the match a "game best forgotten". In late September — December 2023, Popović was a contestant on that year's season of a Balkan television music contest called IDJ Show, reaching the final and finishing second. According to the Macedonian media, she was to perform at the San Remo Festival in Italy. (Note: Sources)

== Notes ==
Awards and achievements
Preceded by Dorijan Dlaka with "Žimi ovoj frak"	North Macedonia in the Junior Eurovision Song Contest; 2013	Succeeded by Ivana Petkovska and Magdalena Aleksovska with "Pletenka - Braid of Love"
