= Malta in the Junior Eurovision Song Contest =

- Junior Eurovision Song Contest
- Participating broadcaster: Public Broadcasting Services (PBS)

Participation summary
- Appearances: 22
- First appearance: 2003
- Highest placement: 1st: 2013, 2015
- Host: 2014, 2016, 2026
- Participation history: 2003; 2004; 2005; 2006; 2007; 2008; 2009; 2010; 2011; 2012; 2013; 2014; 2015; 2016; 2017; 2018; 2019; 2020; 2021; 2022; 2023; 2024; 2025; 2026
- For the most recent participation see Malta in the Junior Eurovision Song Contest 2026

Malta has been represented at the Junior Eurovision Song Contest 22 times since debuting at the first contest in 2003. The Maltese participating broadcaster in the contest is Public Broadcasting Services (PBS). It organises a televised national final to select its entrant. PBS did not participate in 2011 and 2012, and selected the entrant internally instead of using a national final in 2013 and 2014. It has won the contest twice: in 2013 with "The Start" by Gaia Cauchi, and again in 2015 with "Not My Soul" by Destiny Chukunyere with 185 points. Following those wins, PBS hosted the contest in 2014, 2016 and 2026. It finished last three times; in 2005, 2019, and 2022.

== History ==
On 16 July 2011, PBS announced its withdrawal from the ninth edition of the Junior Eurovision Song Contest; the first time Malta was absent. Malta did not participate in 2011 and 2012, and decided to return in 2013. In 2013, PBS opted for an internal selection since the broadcaster decided to return to the contest at a rather late stage (25 September 2013). PBS chose Gaia Cauchi as the 2013 Maltese representative.

Because Malta has multiple official languages, entrants can sing in Maltese and English.

== Participation overview ==
Table key
1	First place
◁	Last place

Year	Artist	Song	Language	Place	Points
2003	Sarah Harrison	"Like a Star"	English	7	56
2004	Young Talent Team	"Power of a Song"	English	12	14
2005	Thea and Friends	"Make It Right!"	English	16 ◁	18
2006	Sophie Debattista	"Extra Cute"	English	11	48
2007	Cute	"Music"	English	12	37
2008	Daniel Testa	"Junior Swing"	English	4	100
2009	Francesca and Mikaela	"Double Trouble"	English	8	55
2010	Nicole Azzopardi	"Knock Knock!… Boom! Boom!"	English, Maltese	13	35
2013	Gaia Cauchi	"The Start"	English	1	130
2014	Federica Falzon	"Diamonds"	English	4	116
2015	Destiny Chukunyere	"Not My Soul"	English	1	185
2016	Christina Magrin	"Parachute"	English	6	191
2017	Gianluca Cilia	"Dawra tond"	English, Maltese	9	107
2018	Ela	"Marchin' On"	English	5	181
2019	Eliana Gomez Blanco	"We Are More"	English, Maltese	19 ◁	29
2020	Chanel Monseigneur	"Chasing Sunsets"	English	8	100
2021	Ike and Kaya	"My Home"	English	12	97
2022	Gaia Gambuzza	"Diamonds in the Skies"	English	16 ◁	43
2023	Yulan	"Stronger"	English	10	94
2024	Ramires Sciberras	"Stilla ċkejkna"	Maltese	5	153
2025	Eliza Borg	"I Believe"	English	11	92
2026	Beppe Caruana	"Blue Bird"	English	7	136

=== Photogallery ===
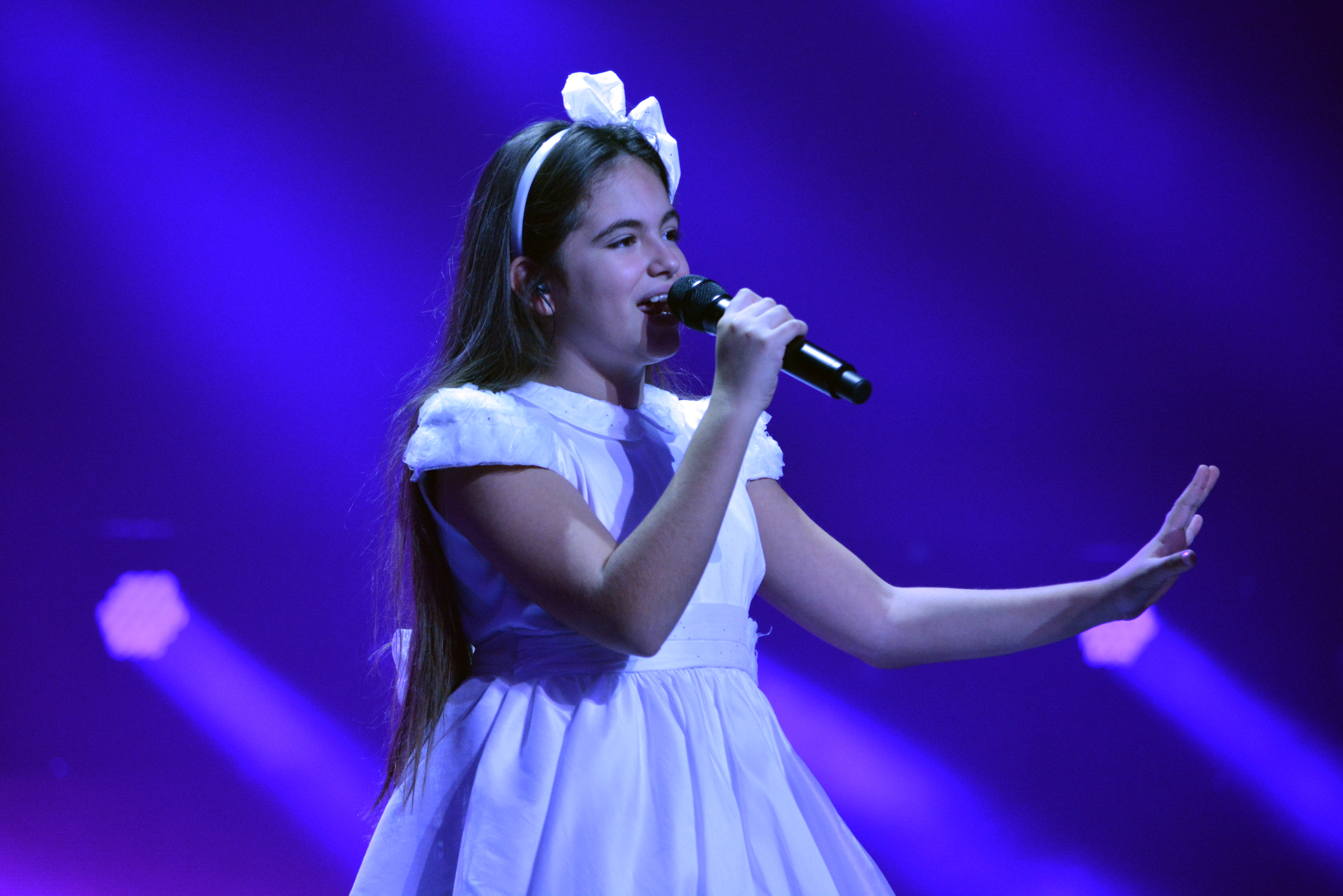
Gaia Cauchi in Kyiv (2013)

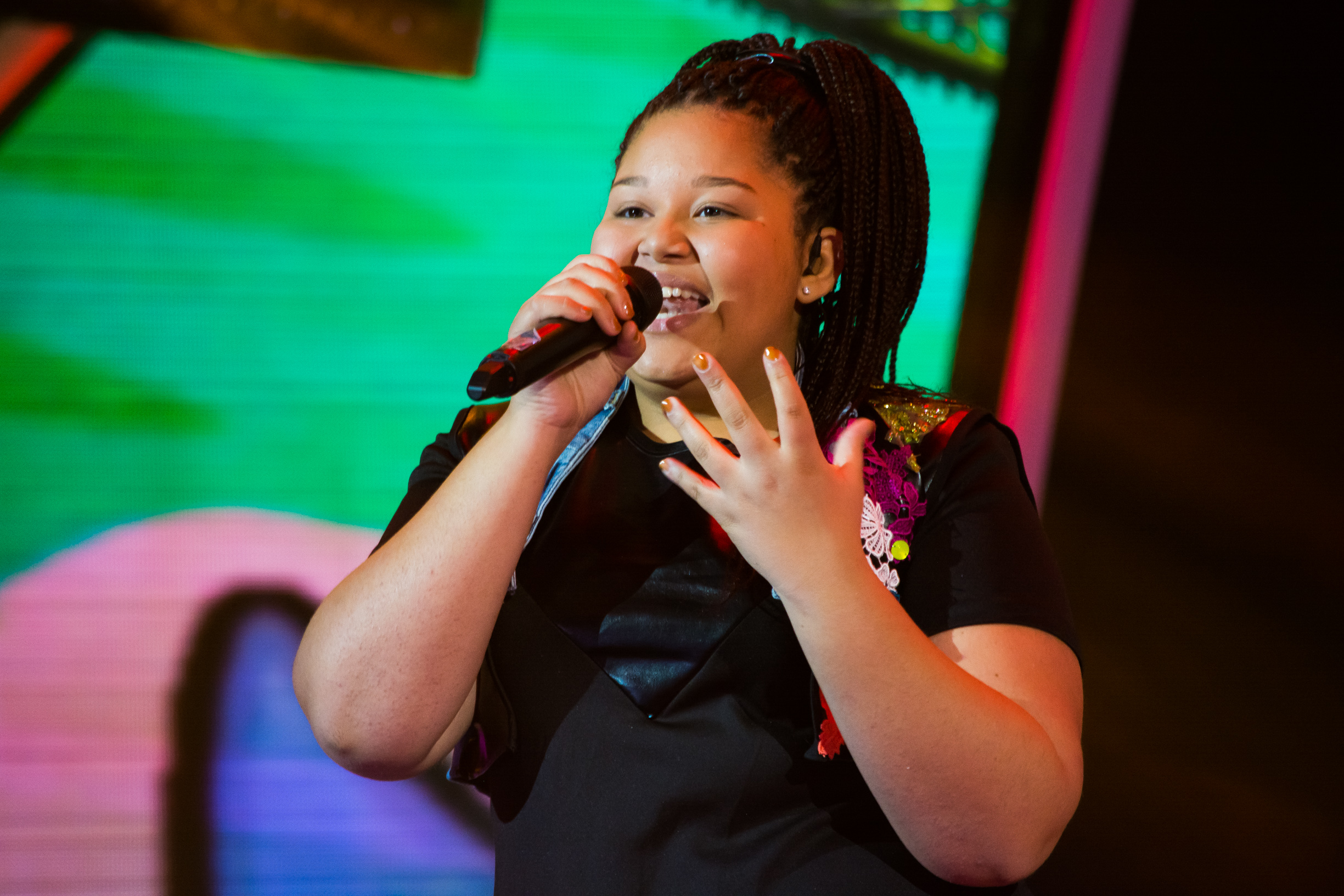
Destiny Chukunyere in Sofia (2015)

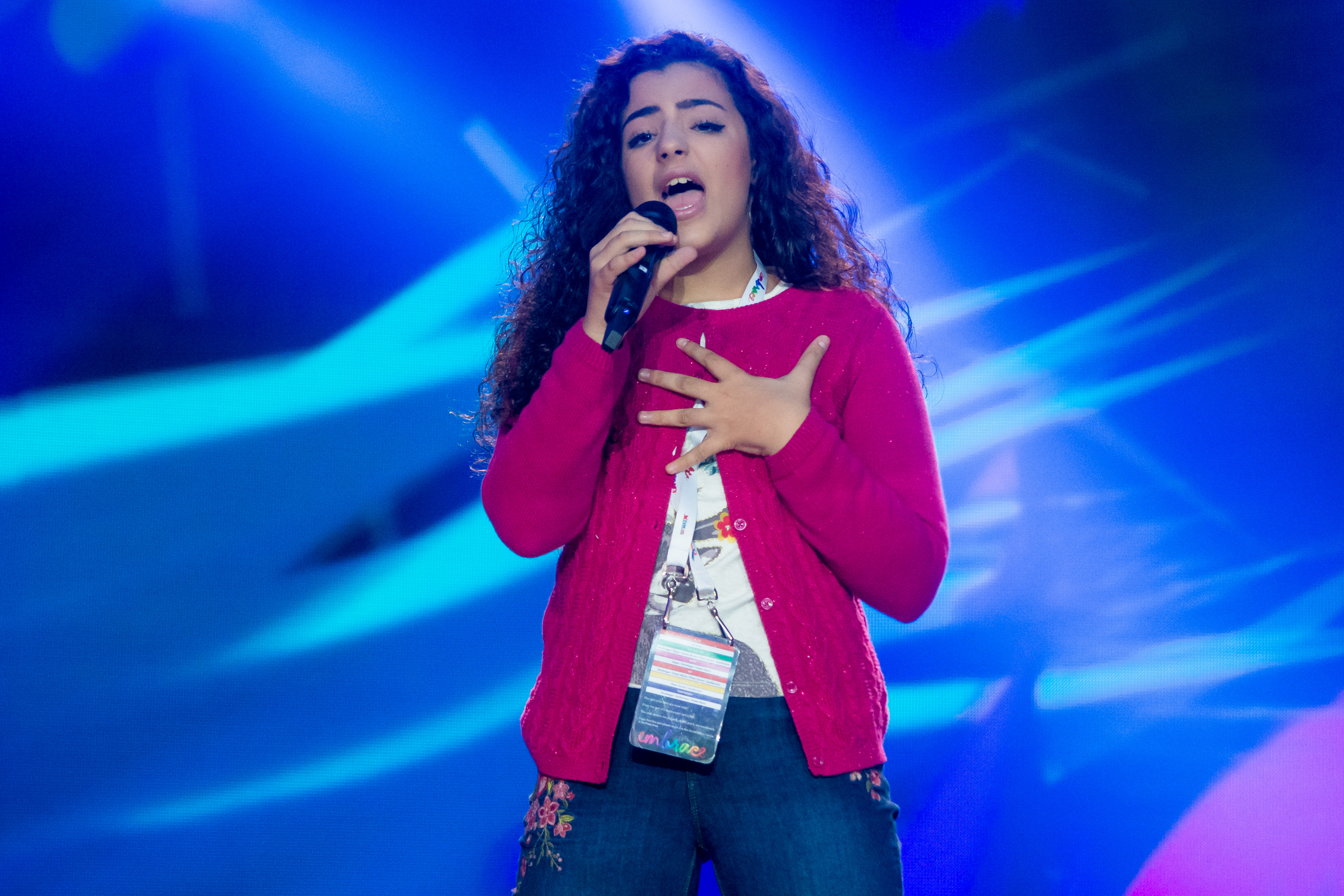
Christina Magrin in Valletta (2016)

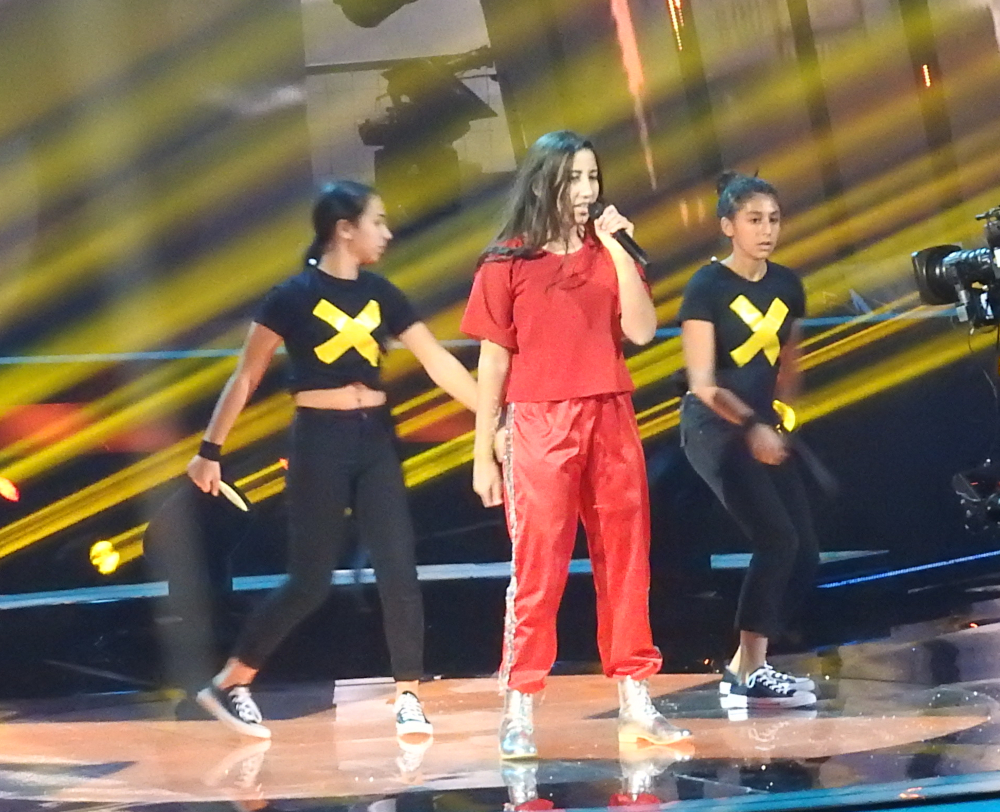
Ela Mangion in Minsk (2018)

== Awards ==
=== Winners of the press vote ===
Year	Song	Artist	Place	Points	Host city
2015	"Not My Soul"	Destiny Chukunyere	1	185	(Bulgaria) Sofia

== Commentators and spokespersons ==
Year	Commentator	Spokesperson
2003	Unknown	
2004	Valerie Vella	Thea Saliba
2005	Valerie Vella	Stephanie Bason
2006	Valerie Vella	Jack Curtis
2007	Valerie Vella	Sophie DeBattista
2008	Valerie Vella	Francesca Zarb
2009	Valerie Vella	Daniel Testa
2010	Eileen Montesin	Francesca Zarb
2011	No broadcast	Did not participate
2012	No broadcast	Did not participate
2013	Corazon Mizzi and Daniel Chircop	Maxine Pace
2014	Daniel Chircop	Julian Pulis
2015	Corazon Mizzi	Federica Falzon
2016	No commentary	Gaia Cauchi
2017	No commentary	Mariam Andghuladze
2018	No commentary	Milana Borodko
2019	No commentary	Paula
2020	No commentary	Leah Mifsud
2021	No commentary	Eden
2022	No commentary	Gaia Cauchi
2023	No commentary	Gaia Gambuzza
2024	No commentary	Yulan Law
2025	No commentary	Ramires Sciberras
2026	No commentary	Chanel Monseigneur

== Hostings ==
Year	Location	Venue	Presenter(s)	Ref.
2014	Marsa	Malta Shipbuilding	Moira Delia	
2016	Valletta	Mediterranean Conference Centre	Ben Camille and Valerie Vella	
2026	Ta' Qali	Malta Fairs & Conventions Centre	Gaia Cauchi, Destiny Chukunyere and Keane Cutajar	

== See also ==
- Malta in the Eurovision Song Contest – Senior version of the Junior Eurovision Song Contest.
