= Latvia in the Junior Eurovision Song Contest 2005 =

- Junior Eurovision Song Contest 2005
- Participating broadcaster: Latvijas Televīzija (LTV)
- Country: Latvia
- Selection process: National final
- Selection date: 17 September 2005

Competing entry
- Song: "Es esmu maza, jauka meitene"
- Artist: Kids4Rock
- Songwriters: Monta Beļinska; Daniēls Groza

Placement
- Final result: 11th, 50 points

Participation chronology

Latvia was represented at the Junior Eurovision Song Contest 2005 with the song "Es esmu maza, jauka meitene", written by Monta Beļinska and Daniēls Groza, and performed by Kids4Rock. The Latvian participating broadcaster, Latvijas Televīzija (LTV), organised a national final to select its entry for the contest.

== Before Junior Eurovision ==
=== National final ===
Latvijas Televīzija (LTV) opened a submission window for the national final from 1 May 2005 until 23 May 2005. 44 songs were submitted to LTV. Ten entries were selected for the national final, and the competing artists and songs were announced on 28 May 2005 on the show Surpu Turpu.

The running order for the final was revealed on 28 August 2005.

The final took place on 17 September 2005 at the Jūras vārti Theatre in Ventspils, hosted by Valters & Kazha. Ten entries competed and the song with the highest number of votes from the public, "Es esmu maza, jauka meitene" performed by Daniels Groza & Monta Beļinska, were declared the winners.

Final – 17 September 2005
R/O	Artist	Song	Televote	Place
1	Laura Grigorjeva	"Bam, Bam, Bam"	965	6
2	Kristiāna Stirāne	"Lielais baltais draugs"	2,183	2
3	Elīna Zariņa & Ieva Vilciņa	"Vēlies"	662	9
4	Ieva Sutugova	"Nāc līdz!"	1,000	5
5	Kristīna Brjazgunova	"Karnevāls"	835	7
6	Madara Grēgere	"Viss notiksies!"	759	8
7	Daniels Groza & Monta Beļinska	"Es esmu maza, jauka meitene"	2,331	1
8	Ilze Ozoliņa	"Nāciet visi man līdzi"	1,058	4
9	Sabīne Berezina	"Reiz kādā pilsētā"	1,946	3
10	Evita Gržibovska	"Lidojums sapnī'	552	10

== At Junior Eurovision ==
=== Voting ===
Points awarded to Latvia
Score	Country
12 points (Note: All countries received one set of 12 points to ensure no country finished with nul points.)	
10 points	
8 points	
7 points	
6 points	Belarus
5 points	Croatia; Russia; United Kingdom
4 points	
3 points	Greece; Malta; Spain
2 points	Macedonia; Serbia and Montenegro; Sweden
1 point	Norway; Romania

Points awarded by Latvia
Score	Country
12 points	Belarus
10 points	Russia
8 points	Norway
7 points	Belgium
6 points	Denmark
5 points	Spain
4 points	Macedonia
3 points	Romania
2 points	United Kingdom
1 point	Netherlands
