= List of countries in the Junior Eurovision Song Contest =

Participation since 2003: Entered at least once Never entered, although eligible to do so Entry intended, but later withdrew Competed as a part of another country, but never as a sovereign state (Note: Kosovo has never participated in the contest. However, at the time of the 2006 and 2007 contests, Kosovo was a province of Serbia, which itself was a constituent republic of participating country Serbia and Montenegro during the 2005 contest.)

Map showing each country's number of Junior Eurovision Song Contest wins

Broadcasters from forty-one countries have participated in the Junior Eurovision Song Contest since it started in 2003, with winning songs coming from twelve of those countries. The contest, organised by the European Broadcasting Union (EBU), is held annually between members of the union who participate representing their countries. Broadcasters submit songs to the event where they are performed live by the performer(s) aged 9 to 14 they had selected, and cast votes to determine the winning song of the competition.

Participation in the contest is primarily open to all broadcasters with active EBU membership, with only one entrant per country allowed in any given year. To become an active member of the EBU, a broadcaster has to be from a country which is covered by the European Broadcasting Area –that is not limited only to the continent of Europe–, or is a member state of the Council of Europe. Thus, eligibility is not determined by geographic inclusion within Europe, despite the "Euro" in "Eurovision", nor does it have a direct connection with the European Union. Several countries geographically outside the boundaries of Europe have been represented in the contest: Cyprus, Armenia, and Israel, in Western Asia, since 2003, 2007, and 2012 respectively; and Australia making a début in the 2015 contest. In addition, several transcontinental countries with only part of their territory in Europe have been represented: Russia, since 2005; Georgia, since 2007; Azerbaijan, since 2012; and Kazakhstan, which made its first appearance in the 2018 edition. Australia, where the contest has been broadcast since 2003, débuted as a participant in the 2015 edition, as its broadcaster is an EBU associate member and had received special approval from the contest's Reference Group.

The Netherlands is the only country to have entered the contest each year since 2003, while Switzerland have only entered on one occasion, in 2004. Broadcasters from three countries – Slovakia, Monaco, and Bosnia and Herzegovina – have announced their intention to enter the contest before withdrawing prior to the country's debut.

== Participants ==
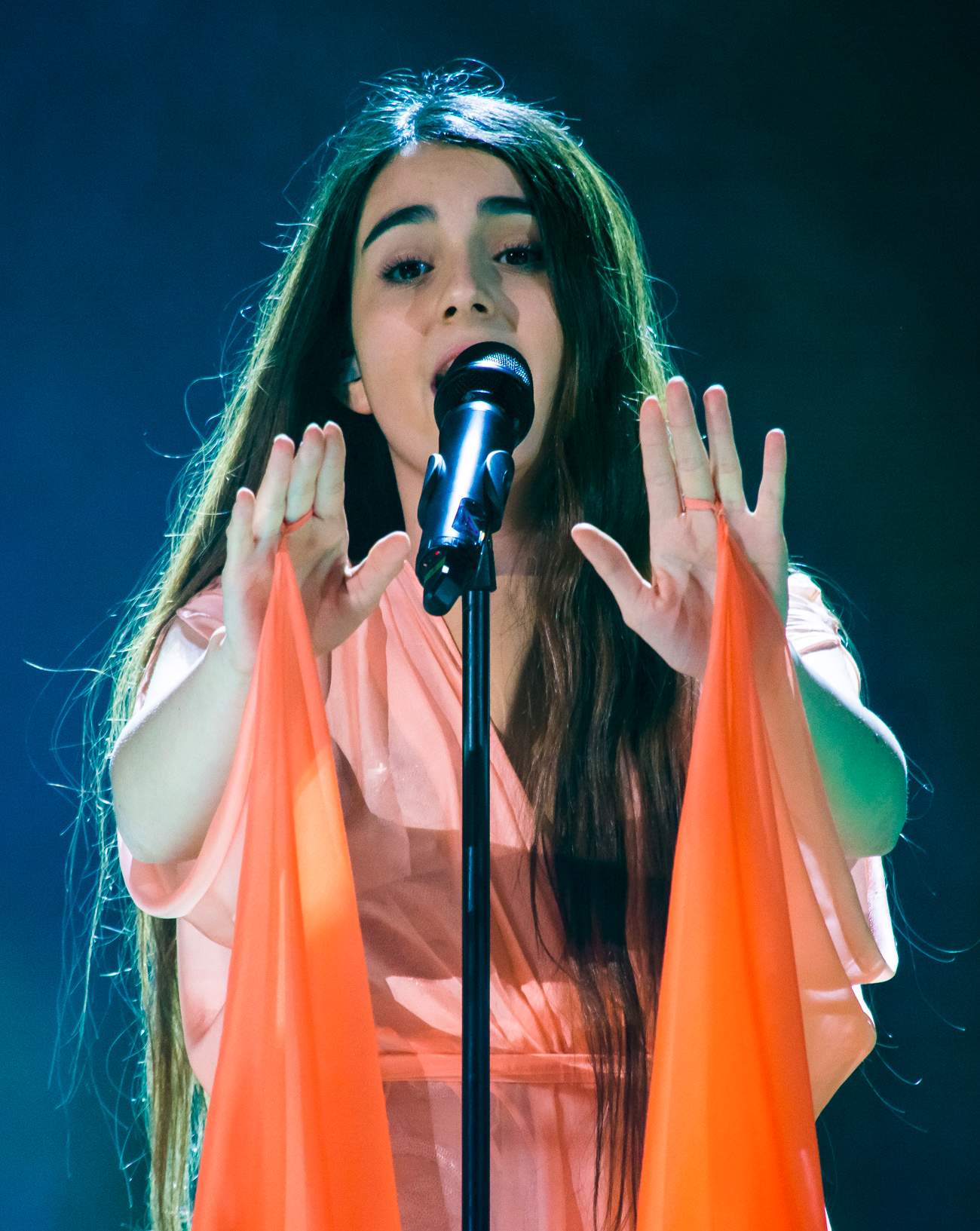
Anna Trincher, representing Ukraine in 2015.

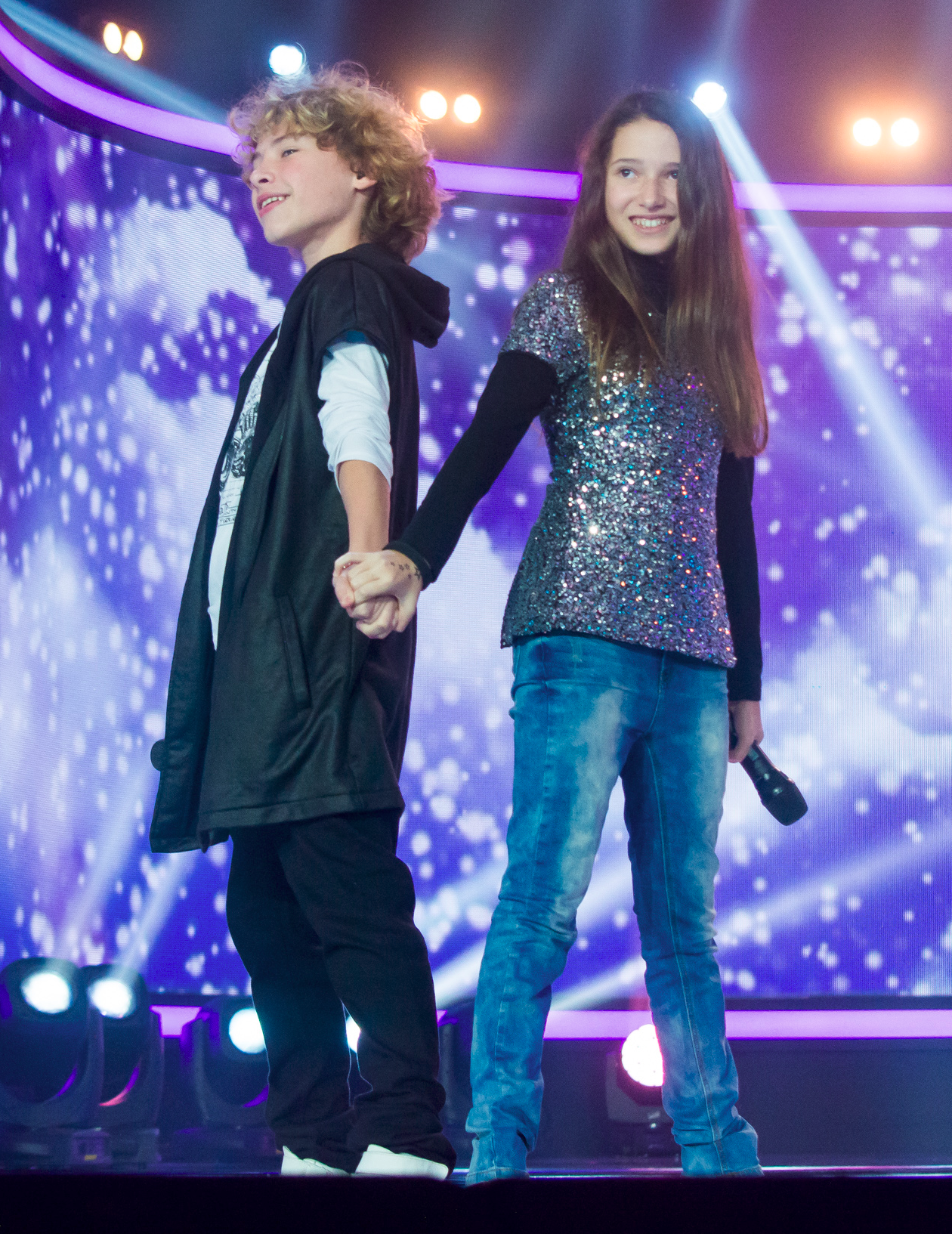
After a three-year hiatus, Israel was represented by Shir and Tim in 2016.

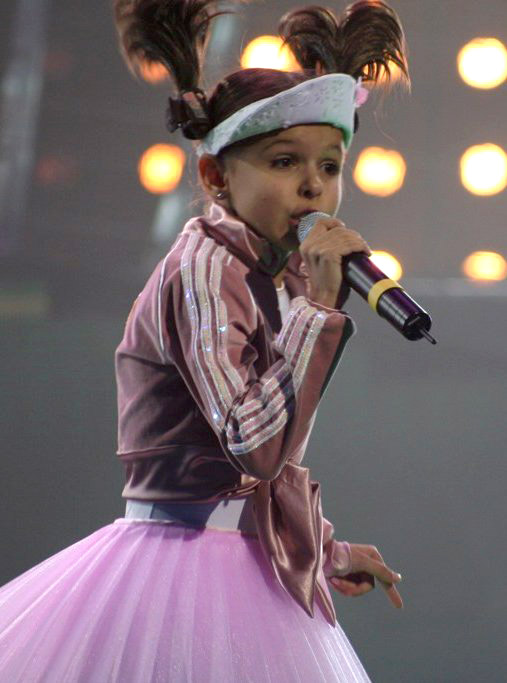
Ksenia Sitnik represented Belarus in 2005, winning the contest with the song "My vmeste".

The following table lists the countries with a broadcaster that have participated in the contest at least once. Shading indicates countries whose broadcaster have withdrawn from the contest.

Switzerland participated in the contest once, in 2004. France, who also took part that year, returned to the contest in 2018. Denmark, the host country of the first contest in 2003, has not been at the contest since 2005, along with Norway, who also participated in 2003. Poland withdrew after the 2004 contest, due to placing last in both 2003 and 2004, but returned in 2016. United Kingdom withdrew from the contest in 2005, but returned in 2022, and withdrawn again in 2024. Spain, instead, withdrew one year later and returned in 2019. Croatia, the first winner of the contest, returned to the contest in 2014 after seven years out of the contest. However, the country placed last and withdrew again.

Serbia and Montenegro participated once in 2005, but dissolved in 2006. Serbia competed independently from the 2006 contest onwards. Montenegro made their debut as an independent nation in 2014.

The original Scandinavian broadcasters left the contest in 2006 because they found the treatment of the contestants unethical, and revived the MGP Nordic competition, which had not been produced since the Junior Eurovision Song Contest began. Sweden, however, continued to participate with a new broadcaster, TV4. TV4 did not participate in 2008, but returned in 2009. SVT returned to the contest in 2010, after TV4 withdrew earlier that year. Sweden's most recent participation was in 2014.

Broadcasters of Belarus and Russia were expelled from the EBU in 2021 and 2022 respectively, preventing them from competing in future editions of the contest.

Table key
†	Inactive – countries which participated in the past but did not appear in the most recent contest, or will not appear in the upcoming contest
◇	Ineligible – countries whose broadcasters are no longer part of the EBU and are therefore ineligible to participate
‡	Former – countries which previously participated but no longer exist

Country	Broadcaster(s)	Debut year	Most recent entry	Entries	Wins	Most recent win
Albania	RTSH	2012	2026	12	0	—N/a
Armenia	AMPTV	2007	2026	19	3	2026
Australia †	ABC (Note: Between 2017 and 2019; previously represented by the Special Broadcasting Service (SBS) in 2015 and 2016)	2015	2019	5	0	—N/a
Azerbaijan †	İTV	2012	2025	5	0	—N/a
Belarus ◇	BTRC	2003	2020	18	2	2007
Belgium †	RTBF / VRT (Note: VRT and RTBF alternated responsibilities for the contest between 2003 and 2004, with joint responsibility in 2005. From 2006 until their withdrawal VRT was Belgium's sole representative.)	2003	2012	10	0	—N/a
Bulgaria †	BNT	2007	2021	7	0	—N/a
Croatia †	HRT	2003	2025	6	1	2003
Cyprus	CyBC	2003	2026	12	0	—N/a
Denmark †	DR	2003	2005	3	0	—N/a
Estonia †	ERR	2023	2024	2	0	—N/a
France	France Télévisions	2004	2026	10	4	2025
Georgia	GPB	2007	2026	20	4	2024
Germany †	Kika (Note: A joint-venture by ARD and ZDF)	2020	2024	4	0	—N/a
Greece †	ERT	2003	2008	6	0	—N/a
Ireland	TG4	2015	2026	11	0	—N/a
Israel †	IPBC (Note: In 2018; previously represented by the Israel Broadcasting Authority (IBA) in 2012 and 2016)	2012	2018	3	0	—N/a
Italy	RAI	2014	2026	12	1	2014
Kazakhstan †	Khabar Agency	2018	2022	5	0	—N/a
Latvia †	LTV (Note: Between 2003 and 2011; Latvian Public Service Media (LSM) is the current EBU member in the country since 2025, thus eligible to participate in the contest.)	2003	2011	5	0	—N/a
Lithuania †	LRT	2007	2011	4	0	—N/a
Malta	PBS	2003	2026	22	2	2015
Moldova †	TRM	2010	2013	4	0	—N/a
Montenegro	RTCG	2014	2026	4	0	—N/a
Netherlands	AVROTROS (Note: Since 2014; previously represented by Algemene Vereniging Radio Omroep (AVRO) between 2003 and 2013)	2003	2026	24	1	2009
North Macedonia (Note: Until 2018 participated as F.Y.R. Macedonia)	MRT	2003	2026	21	0	—N/a
Norway †	NRK	2003	2005	3	0	—N/a
Poland	TVP	2003	2026	13	2	2019
Portugal	RTP	2006	2026	11	0	—N/a
Romania †	TVR	2003	2009	7	0	—N/a
Russia ◇	RTR	2005	2021	17	2	2017
San Marino	SMRTV	2013	2026	6	0	—N/a
Serbia †	RTS	2006	2022	14	0	—N/a
Serbia and Montenegro ‡	UJRT	2005		1	0	—N/a
Slovenia †	RTVSLO	2014	2015	2	0	—N/a
Spain	RTVE (Note: Since 2019; previously represented by Televisión Española (TVE) between 2003 and 2006)	2003	2026	12	1	2004
Sweden †	SVT (Note: Represented by TV4 in 2006, 2007 and 2009)	2003	2014	11	0	—N/a
Switzerland †	SRG SSR	2004		1	0	—N/a
Ukraine	Suspilne	2006	2026	21	1	2012
United Kingdom †	BBC (Note: Since 2022; previously represented by ITV between 2003 and 2005)	2003	2023	5	0	—N/a
Wales †	S4C	2018	2019	2	0	—N/a

=== Other EBU members ===
The following countries have broadcasters eligible to participate in the contest, but have never done so. The Hungarian broadcaster also sent representatives to the 2013 Belarusian national final.

- Algeria – ENTV, ENRS, TDA
- Andorra – RTVA
- Austria – ORF
- Bosnia and Herzegovina – BHRT
- Canada – CBC/Radio-Canada
- Czech Republic – ČRo, ČT
- Egypt – ERTU
- Finland – Yle
- Hungary – MTVA
- Iceland – RÚV
- Jordan – JRTV
- Kosovo – RTK
- Lebanon – TL
- Libya – LNC
- Luxembourg – RTL, ERSL
- Monaco – MMD, TVMonaco
- Morocco – SNRT
- Scotland – BBC Alba, STV
- Slovakia – STVR
- Tunisia – TT, RT (RTT)
- Turkey – TRT
- Vatican City – RV

== Participating countries by decade ==
Participants in the Junior Eurovision Song Contest, coloured by decade of debut

The tables list the participating countries in each decade since the first Junior Eurovision Song Contest was held in 2003.

Sixteen countries participated in the first contest. Since then, the number of entries has fluctuated, peaking at twenty in 2018 and dropping to a low of twelve in 2012, 2013 and 2020.

Line graph showing the number of countries participating in each Junior Eurovision Song Contest. View source data.

Table key
#	Debutant	The country made its debut during the decade.
1	Winner	The country won the contest.
2	Second place	The country was ranked second.
3	Third place	The country was ranked third.
X	Remaining places	The country placed from fourth to second last.
◁	Last place	The country was ranked last.
W/D	Withdrawn or disqualified	The country was to participate in the contest, but was disqualified or withdrew.
U	Upcoming	The country has confirmed participation for the next contest, however, the contest has yet to take place.
	No entry	The country did not enter the contest.

=== 2000s ===
2003–2009
Country	2003	2004	2005	2006	2007	2008	2009
Armenia #					2	X	2
Azerbaijan						W	
Belarus #	X	X	1	2	1	X	X
Belgium #	X	X	X	X	X	X	X
Bosnia and Herzegovina					W	W	
Bulgaria #					X	◁	
Croatia #	1	3	X	X			
Cyprus #	X	X	D	X	X	X	X
Denmark #	X	X	X				
France #		X					
Georgia #			W		X	1	X
Germany	W	W					
Greece #	X	X	X	X	◁	X	
Israel		W				W	
Latvia #	X	◁	X				
Lithuania #			W		X	3	
Macedonia #	X	X	X	◁	X	X	X
Malta #	X	X	◁	X	X	X	X
Netherlands #	X	X	X	X	X	X	1
Norway #	X	X	3				
Poland #	◁	◁					
Portugal #				X	X		
Romania #	X	X	X	X	X	X	◁
Russia #			X	1	X	X	2
Serbia #				X	3	X	X
Serbia and Montenegro #			X				
Slovakia	W						
Spain #	2	1	2	X	W		
Sweden #	X	X	X	3	X		X
Switzerland #		X					
Ukraine #			W	X	X	2	X
United Kingdom #	3	2	X				

=== 2010s ===
2010–2019
Country	2010	2011	2012	2013	2014	2015	2016	2017	2018	2019
Albania #			◁			Х	Х	X	X	X
Armenia	1	Х	3	Х	3	2	2	X	X	X
Australia #						Х	Х	3	3	X
Azerbaijan #			Х	Х					X	
Belarus	Х	3	Х	3	Х	Х	Х	X	X	X
Belgium	Х	Х	Х							
Bulgaria		Х			2	Х	Х			
Croatia					◁					
Cyprus					Х		Х	◁		
France									2	X
Georgia	Х	1	2	Х	Х	Х	1	2	X	X
Ireland #						Х	Х	X	X	X
Israel #			Х				Х		X	
Italy #					1	Х	3	X	X	X
Kazakhstan #									X	2
Latvia	Х	◁								
Lithuania	Х	Х								
Malta	Х			1	Х	1	Х	X	X	◁
Moldova #	Х	Х	Х	Х						
Montenegro #					Х	Х				
Netherlands	Х	2	Х	Х	Х	Х	Х	X	X	X
North Macedonia	Х	Х		◁		◁	Х	X	X	X
Poland							Х	Х	1	1
Portugal								X	X	X
Russia	2	Х	Х	Х	Х	Х	Х	1	X	X
San Marino #		W		Х	Х	Х				
Serbia	3				Х	Х	◁	X	X	X
Slovenia #					Х	3				
Spain										3
Sweden	Х	Х	Х	Х	Х					
Ukraine	◁	Х	1	2	Х	Х	Х	X	X	X
Wales #									◁	X

=== 2020s ===
2020–2027
Country	2020	2021	2022	2023	2024	2025	2026	2027
Albania		Х	X	X	X	X	X	U
Armenia	W	1	2	3	X	X	1	
Azerbaijan		Х				X		
Belarus	X							
Bulgaria		Х						
Croatia						X		
Cyprus					X	X	X	
Estonia #				X	X			
France	1	3	1	1	X	1	3	
Georgia	X	X	3	X	1	3	X	
Germany #	◁	X		X	X			
Ireland		X	X	◁	X	◁	X	
Italy		X	X	X	X	X	X	
Kazakhstan	2	X	X					
Malta	X	X	◁	X	X	X	X	
Montenegro						X	X	
Netherlands	X	◁	X	X	X	X	X	U
North Macedonia		X	X	X	X	X	◁	U
Poland	X	2	X	X	X	X	X	U
Portugal		X	X	X	2	X	X	
Russia	X	X						
San Marino					◁	X	X	
Serbia	X	X	X					
Spain	3	X	X	2	X	X	2	U
Ukraine	X	X	X	X	3	2	X	
United Kingdom		X	X					

== Other countries ==
There have been a few unsuccessful attempts to participate in the Junior Eurovision Song Contest. For broadcasters to participate, they must be a member of the EBU and register their intention to compete before the deadline specified in the rules of that year's event. Each participating broadcaster pays a fee towards the organisation of the contest. Should a country withdraw from the contest after the deadline, they will still need to pay these fees, and may also incur a fine or temporary ban.

=== Bosnia and Herzegovina ===
Bosnia and Herzegovina was one of the nineteen countries which applied to enter the Junior Eurovision Song Contest 2007. As there was a maximum number of eighteen countries permitted to perform, Georgia, the nineteenth country to apply, was unable to participate. However, on 21 June 2007, it was announced that Bosnia and Herzegovina had withdrawn from the contest, enabling Georgia to enter the contest. Once again in 2008, Bosnia and Herzegovina applied to make its debut at the contest along with Azerbaijan and Israel, but all three countries withdrew before the contest took place. While the latter two debuted in 2012, as of 2026, Bosnia and Herzegovina is still yet to participate in the Junior Eurovision Song Contest, and has not taken part in the adult contest since 2016. It also remains only ex-Yugoslav country that has not participated in the contest yet.

Prior to 2007, Bosnia and Herzegovina had broadcast the Junior Eurovision Song Contest twice: it provided a delayed broadcast of 2004 contest, and broadcast the 2006 contest live. The contest was also broadcast live in Bosnia and Herzegovina in 2007, 2008 and 2009. In 2010 and 2011, BHRT organised a delayed broadcast of the contest.

=== Monaco ===
Monegasque broadcaster TMC expressed an interest in participating in the Junior Eurovision Song Contest 2005, however, plans did not come to fruition due to scheduling problems and harsh citizenship laws and thus they did not participate. They had stated an interest again to take part in Junior Eurovision Song Contest 2006, however at the end they did not take part in the contest.

=== Slovakia ===
On 21 November 2002, Slovenská televízia (STV) was drawn as one of the participants in the Junior Eurovision Song Contest 2003, representing Slovakia. However, they later announced that they would withdraw from the contest.

On 7 June 2019, according to Eurovision blog Eurofestivales, press spokesperson Erika Rusnáková for Slovak broadcaster Radio and Television of Slovakia (RTVS) stated that they were evaluating and supervising the possibility of debuting at the 2019 contest. However, on 10 June 2019, RTVS confirmed that they would not debut in the 2019 contest.

In April 2021, the Slovak broadcaster Radio and Television of Slovakia (RTVS) confirmed that they had "not closed the door to the Junior Eurovision Song Contest 2021", signifying that they may possibly make their debut. However, Slovakia later announced that they would not debut in the 2021 contest in Paris.

== Broadcast in non-participating countries ==
The contest has been broadcast in several countries that do not compete.

Country	Broadcaster(s)	Year(s)
Andorra	Ràdio i Televisió d'Andorra (RTVA)	2006
Argentina	Radio WU	2014
Bosnia and Herzegovina	BHT 1	2004
Bosnia and Herzegovina	BHT 1	2006–2011
Finland	Finnish Broadcasting Company (Yle)	2003
Iceland	Ríkisútvarpið (RÚV)	2003, 2021
Kosovo	Radio Television of Kosovo (RTK)	2003, 2013, 2026
Luxembourg	RTL Lëtzebuerg	2024, 2025
New Zealand	World FM	2014–2016
Singapore	Music Radio	2014–2016
United States	KCGW-LP	2014, 2016
United States	KLZY	2016
United States	KMJY	2016
United States	WCGD	2016
United States	WUSB	2015
United States	WXDR-LP	2014

== See also ==
- List of countries in the Eurovision Song Contest
- List of countries in Eurovision Young Musicians
- List of countries in Eurovision Young Dancers
- List of countries in the Eurovision Dance Contest
- List of countries in Eurovision Choir
