= Netherlands in the Junior Eurovision Song Contest 2005 =

- Junior Eurovision Song Contest 2005
- Participating broadcaster: Algemene Vereniging Radio Omroep (AVRO)
- Country: Netherlands
- Selection process: Junior Songfestival 2005
- Selection date: 24 September 2005

Competing entry
- Song: "Stupid"
- Artist: Tess
- Songwriter: Tess Gaerthé

Placement
- Final result: 7th, 82 points

Participation chronology

The Netherlands was represented at the Junior Eurovision Song Contest 2005 with the song "Stupid", written and performed by Tess Gaerthé. The Dutch participating broadcaster, Algemene Vereniging Radio Omroep (AVRO), selected its entry for the contest through a national selection called Junior Songfestival 2005.

== Before Junior Eurovision ==
=== Junior Songfestival 2005 ===
The submission window for Junior Songfestival 2005 was open from 1 January 2005 until 1 April 2005. By the deadline, AVRO received almost 2000 submissions. Out of the submissions, 40 acts were selected to perform in auditions in Hilversum at 5 and 6 May 2005. A six-member jury selected the participants.

Originally, Stephanie with the song “De wereld om je heen” was a participant of Junior Songfestival 2005, but she withdrew and was replaced by Cleo with the song “Ik lijk zo op een jongen”. On 1 September 2005, 30 second fragments of the competing songs were released. The common song of Junior Songfestival 2005 was “Alles wat je wilt”.

Junior Songfestival 2005 was hosted at the Central Studios in Utrecht and was hosted by Tooske Ragas. The adult jury consisted of Kim-Lian van der Meij, Manuela Kemp, René Froger and Sander Lantinga.

==== Format ====
Junior Songfestival 2005 consisted of two semi-finals and one final. All of the results were decided by 1/3 Kids jury, 1/3 Adult jury and 1/3 televoting. Each semi-final had 5 participants and 2 best-scoring acts qualified for the final. From the acts that didn’t qualify, a jury would select one more participant to the final. The final had 5 participants.

==== Semi-Finals ====
The Semi-Finals were held at 10 and 17 September 2005 at 19:55 CET and was broadcast on Nederland 2.

Semi Final 1 – 10 September 2005
R/O	Artist	Song	Kids jury	Adult jury	Televoting	Total	Place	Result
1	Angelo	"Slapeloze nachten"	7	8	7	22	4	Wildcard
2	Tjindjara	"Blijf jezelf"	10	10	8	28	2	Qualified
3	De Smilies	"Als je lacht"	6	7	10	23	3	—N/a
4	Mitchell	"Jij bent alles voor mij"	8	6	6	20	5	—N/a
5	Tess	"Stupid"	12	12	12	36	1	Qualified

Semi Final 2 – 17 September 2005
R/O	Artist	Song	Kids jury	Adult jury	Televoting	Total	Place	Result
1	Sophie	"Spetterende tijden"	7	8	7	22	4	—N/a
2	Tyrone	"Keer op keer"	8	7	6	21	5	—N/a
3	Yara and Anjes	"Vriendschap"	10	12	8	30	1	Qualified
4	Giovanni	"Machteloos"	12	6	10	28	3	—N/a
5	Cleo	"Ik lijk zo op een jongen"	6	10	12	28	2	Qualified

==== Final ====
The Final was held at 25 September 2005 at 20:00 CET and was broadcast on Nederland 2.

Final – 25 September 2005
R/O	Artist	Song	Kids jury	Adult jury	Televoting	Total	Place
1	Cleo	"Ik lijk op een jongen"	6	10	10	26	2
2	Yara and Anjes	"Vriendschap"	8	6	6	20	5
3	Angelo	"Slapeloze nachten"	7	7	7	21	4
4	Tjindjara	"Blijf jezelf"	10	8	8	26	3
5	Tess	"Stupid"	12	12	12	36	1

== At Junior Eurovision ==
At the running order draw, the Netherlands were drawn to perform ninth on 26 November 2005, following Macedonia and preceding Serbia and Montenegro.

=== Voting ===
Points awarded to the Netherlands
Score	Country
12 points	Belgium
10 points	Denmark
8 points	Malta
7 points	Sweden; United Kingdom
6 points	
5 points	Belarus
4 points	Greece; Norway; Russia; Spain
3 points	
2 points	Cyprus; Romania
1 point	Latvia

Points awarded by the Netherlands
Score	Country
12 points	Belgium
10 points	Norway
8 points	Spain
7 points	Denmark
6 points	Greece
5 points	Romania
4 points	Belarus
3 points	Macedonia
2 points	Croatia
1 point	United Kingdom
