= Greece in the Junior Eurovision Song Contest 2005 =

- Junior Eurovision Song Contest 2005
- Participating broadcaster: Hellenic Broadcasting Corporation (ERT)
- Country: Greece
- Selection process: I teliki epilogi tou ellinikou tragoudiou - Eurovision Junior-05
- Selection date: 30 September 2005

Competing entry
- Song: "Tora einai i seira mas"
- Artist: Alexandros and Kalli
- Songwriters: Alexandros Chountas; Kalli Georgelli

Placement
- Final result: 6th, 88 points

Participation chronology

Greece was represented at the Junior Eurovision Song Contest 2005 with the song Tora einai i seira mas", written and performed by Alexandros Chountas and Kalli Georgelli. The Greek participating broadcaster, the Hellenic Broadcasting Corporation (ERT), selected its entry for the contest through a national final.

== Before Junior Eurovision ==
=== I teliki epilogi tou ellinikou tragoudiou - Eurovision Junior-05 ===
The Hellenic Broadcasting Corporation (ERT) had opened the submission window until the extended deadline on 22 July 2005. By the submission window deadline, 104 entries had been received.

The entries were judged on 7 September 2005 and ten finalists were chosen by a jury consisting of the members of 4Play, Giannis Petropoulos, Marlain Angelides and Paschalis Avranitdis. The ten finalists were revealed the day after, with the songs being released on 12 September 2005. The running order draw took place on 23 September 2005 at club Envy on the beach of Agios Kosmas.

The final took place on 30 September 2005 in Studio D of ERT at 19:00 CEST and broadcast on ET1 and ERT Sat. The show was hosted by Maria Spiridaki and Serafim Silas. The results were decided by 60% televoting and 40% jury. The jury consisted of the members of 4Play, Giannis Petropoulos, Marlain Angelidas, Nikos Voutouras and Paschalis Avranitdis. Guest performers included 4Play, Marlain Angelides and Stavros Konstantinou.

Final – 30 September 2005
R/O	Artist	Song	Songwriter(s)	Place
1	Dimitra Tzanakaki	"Oso zo" ("Όσο ζω")	Dimitra Tzanakaki	4
2	Vasiliki Giannopoulou, Ermelina Choti, Marina Xourgia and Aurora Kamperi	"To proto skirtima" ("Το πρώτο σκίρτημα")	Vasiliki Giannopoulou; Ermelina Choti; Marina Xourgia; Aurora Kamperi	10
3	Christina Petrogianni	"Epitelous peto" ("Επιτέλους πετώ")	Christina Petrogianni	5
4	Caroline Tatara	"Mia istoria" ("Μια ιστορία")	Caroline Tatara	9
5	Marianna Malantzi	"Matia paidika" ("Μάτια παιδικά")	Marianna Malantzi	8
6	Rafaella-Ioanna Chatziaivazoglou, Nausika-Eleftheria Theodoridou, Akrivi Erkekoglou and Konstantinos Katikaridis	"Choros" ("Χορός")	Rafaella-Ioanna Chatziaivazoglou; Nausika-Eleftheria Theodoridou; Akrivi Erkekoglou	6
7	Marina Chelmi	"Vrochi apo astra" ("Βροχή από άστρα")	Marina Chelmi	7
8	Maria Paraponiari	"Harry Potter" ("Χάρι Πότερ")	Maria Paraponiari	2
9	Nikolas Linaritakis-Liodakis	"Itan oniro" ("Ήταν όνειρο")	Nikolas Linaritakis-Liodakis	3
10	Alexandros Chountas and Kalli Georgelli	"Tora einai i seira mas" ("Τώρα είναι η σειρά μας")	Alexandros Chountas; Kalli Georgelli	1

== At Junior Eurovision ==
At the running order draw, Greece were drawn to perform first on 26 November 2005, preceding Denmark.

=== Voting ===
Points awarded to Greece
Score	Country
12 points (Note: All countries received one set of 12 points to ensure no country finished with nul points.)	Croatia; Cyprus
10 points	
8 points	
7 points	Denmark; Russia
6 points	Belgium; Netherlands; Romania; United Kingdom
5 points	Sweden
4 points	Serbia and Montenegro
3 points	Macedonia
2 points	Spain
1 point	

Points awarded by Greece
Score	Country
12 points	Spain
10 points	Romania
8 points	Belarus
7 points	Denmark
6 points	Norway
5 points	Russia
4 points	Netherlands
3 points	Latvia
2 points	Belgium
1 point	Malta
