= United Kingdom in the Junior Eurovision Song Contest 2005 =

- Junior Eurovision Song Contest 2005
- Participating broadcaster: ITV
- Country: United Kingdom
- Selection process: Junior Eurovision Song Contest: The British Final
- Selection date: 3 September 2005

Competing entry
- Song: "How Does It Feel"
- Artist: Joni Fuller
- Songwriter: Joni Fuller

Placement
- Final result: 14th, 28 points

Participation chronology

The United Kingdom was represented at the Junior Eurovision Song Contest 2005, with the song "How Does It Feel", written and performed by Joni Fuller. The British participating broadcaster, ITV, organised a national final to select its entry for the contest.

The British entry was selected to perform fifth in the running order, following the entry from Romania and preceding the entry from Sweden. It finished in fourteenth position with 28 points, which remains the lowest placing ever for the United Kingdom in the Junior Eurovision Song Contest. Following the 2005 contest, ITV withdrew from participation and the UK remained absent until 2022, when the BBC returned to the contest.

== Before Junior Eurovision ==
=== Junior Eurovision Song Contest 2005: The British Final ===
A national final was held by ITV to select its third entry for the Junior Eurovision Song Contest 2005. The final was held on 3 September 2005 at the Granada Studios in Manchester, broadcast on digital channel ITV2, and was hosted by Michael Underwood and Nikki Sanderson. Televoting selected the winner from the eight competing entries, which votes separated into six voting groups based on geographical area.

Final – 3 September 2005
R/O	Artist	Song	Points	Place
1	Vicky Gordon	"Groovy Chick"	23	6
2	Craig Lees	"Clear the Air"	35	4
3	Jessica Stretton	"About You"	26	5
4	Jack Garratt	"The Girl"	13	8
5	Ben Smith	"Lovely"	41	2
6	Sarah Robertson	"In My Life"	36	3
7	Lizzi M	"Devil in a Hood"	17	7
8	Joni Fuller	"How Does It Feel"	43	1

Detailed Regional Televoting Results
R/O	Song	UK Text & Mobiles	Regional televoting					Total
R/O	Song	UK Text & Mobiles	Northern Ireland	Northern England	Scotland	Southern England	Wales	Total
1	"Groovy Chick"	10	3	2	3	2	3	23
2	"Clear the Air"	5	5	10	8	3	4	35
3	"About You"	3	4	6	6	1	6	26
4	"The Girl"	1	2	1	1	6	2	13
5	"Lovely"	6	10	5	2	10	8	41
6	"In My Life"	2	6	8	5	5	10	36
7	"Devil in a Hood"	4	1	3	4	4	1	17
8	"How Does It Feel"	8	8	4	10	8	5	43
Spokespersons
UK Text & Mobiles: Cory Spedding; Northern Ireland: Stuart McQuitty; Northern England: Jemma Gofton; Scotland: Michelle Watt; Southern England: Darren Malcolm; Wales: Rhydian Bowen Phillips

== At Junior Eurovision ==
On the night of the contest, held in Hasselt, Belgium, Joni Fuller performed 5th in the running order of the contest, following Romania and preceding Sweden. At the close of the voting Joni has received 28 points, placing 14th of the 16 competing entries, giving the United Kingdom their worst entry at the contest.

In the United Kingdom, the show was televised on digital channel ITV2 with commentary by Underwood. The British spokesperson, who announced the British votes during the final, was national finalist Vicky Gordon. A delayed broadcast, consisting of highlights, was aired on ITV1 the following afternoon. The contest was watched by 700,000 viewers on ITV1 (down 63.16% compared with 2004 viewing figures), with 171,000 watching live on ITV2 (down 22.62% compared with 2004).

ITV withdrew from the contest after 2005 due to poor viewing figures, and the termination of the Junior Eurovision contract signed by ITV in 2003. The UK returned to the contest in 2022, with the BBC replacing ITV as the participating broadcaster.

=== Voting ===
Points awarded to the United Kingdom
Score	Country
12 points (Note: All countries received one set of 12 points to ensure no country finished with nul points.)	
10 points	
8 points	
7 points	
6 points	
5 points	Malta
4 points	
3 points	Denmark
2 points	Belarus; Belgium; Latvia
1 point	Netherlands; Russia

Points awarded by the United Kingdom
Score	Country
12 points	Spain
10 points	Belarus
8 points	Norway
7 points	Netherlands
6 points	Greece
5 points	Latvia
4 points	Macedonia
3 points	Romania
2 points	Russia
1 point	Denmark
