= Junior Eurovision Song Contest 2027 =

International song competition

- United by Music

Organisation
- Organiser: European Broadcasting Union (EBU)

Participants (provisional; as of November 2026)
- Intend on participating: 6
- Participation map: Countries which have provisionally confirmed their participation in 2027 Countries which have participated in past editions

The Junior Eurovision Song Contest 2027 is set to be the 25th edition of the Junior Eurovision Song Contest. It will be organised by the European Broadcasting Union (EBU) and the designated host broadcaster.

== Location ==
Unlike the Eurovision Song Contest, the winning broadcaster of the previous year's Junior Eurovision Song Contest is not automatically required to host the following contest; however, it has held the right of first refusal since 2019. The EBU has stated that it will work with its members, including the Public Television of Armenia (AMPTV), which won the 2026 contest for Armenia with the song "Boo!" by Naré, to determine the host broadcaster for 2027.

== Provisional list of participants ==
Eligibility for participation in the Junior Eurovision Song Contest requires a national broadcaster with an EBU membership capable of receiving the contest via the Eurovision network and broadcasting it live nationwide. The EBU issues an invitation to participate in the contest to all members.

As of November 2026, broadcasters from the following countries have publicly confirmed their intention to participate in the 2027 contest.

Junior Eurovision Song Contest 2027 participants
Country	Broadcaster	Artist	Song	Language	Songwriter(s)	Ref.
Albania	RTSH					
Netherlands	AVROTROS					
North Macedonia	MRT					
Poland	TVP	TBD 8 May 2027				
San Marino	SMRTV					
Spain	RTVE					

=== Confirmation statements ===
- Albania – RTSH has confirmed that it will resume the national final Junior Fest to select its entry for 2027.
- Netherlands – AVROTROS has confirmed that it will continue to hold the national final Junior Songfestival to select its entry for 2027.
- North Macedonia – On 5 October 2026, MRT confirmed its intention to participate in 2027.
- Poland – TVP has confirmed that it will continue to use the talent show The Voice Kids to select its artist for 2027. The final is scheduled for 8 May.
- San Marino – On 10 November 2026, SMRTV confirmed its intention to participate in 2027.
- Spain – On 29 September 2026, RTVE confirmed its intention to participate in 2027.

=== Other countries ===
EBU member broadcasters in Australia, Austria, Belgium (VRT), Bosnia and Herzegovina, Czech Republic, Denmark, Finland, Germany (Kika and SWR), Iceland, Israel, Latvia, Lithuania, Luxembourg, Norway (NRK), Slovenia, Sweden, Switzerland, and Wales confirmed non-participation prior to the announcement of the participants list by the EBU. The following countries' broadcasters or other figures have released statements regarding the 2027 contest without confirming participation:

- Canada – On 12 November 2026, CBC/Radio-Canada announced that it was exploring the possibility of making its debut in the contest, with CBC Kids overseeing any activities related to a potential participation.
- Cyprus – In July 2026, CyBC announced it had adopted a new policy of participating in all three EBU music competitions, including the Junior Eurovision Song Contest. An official confirmation of participation in 2027 is pending.
- Moldova – On 12 November 2026, TRM revealed that it was considering a return to the contest, with the broadcaster's board of directors yet to make a decision on participation in 2027. Moldova last took part in 2013.

== See also ==
- Eurovision Song Contest 2027
- Eurovision Young Musicians 2027
