= Russia in the Junior Eurovision Song Contest 2005 =

- Junior Eurovision Song Contest 2005
- Country: Russia
- Selection process: Internal selection
- Announcement date: 10 November 2005

Competing entry
- Song: "Doroga k solntsu"
- Artist: Vladislav Krutskikh

Placement
- Final result: 9th, 66 points

Participation chronology

Russia was represented at the Junior Eurovision Song Contest 2005 in Hasselt, Belgium. The Russian entry was selected through an internal selection. On 10 November 2005 it was revealed that Vladislav Krutskikh would represent Russia in the contest with the song "Doroga k solntsu".

== Before Junior Eurovision ==
=== Internal selection ===
In May 2005, the EBU along with VRT and RTBF, announced that Russia and Russian broadcaster Telekanal Rossiya would debut at the contest in Hasselt. A professional jury internally selected fifteen artists and selected the winner to represent Russia in the contest. The reason behind the internal selection was because the invitation to participate was sent very late in the year, and they couldn't afford to organise a televised national final.

On 10 November 2005, a press-conference devoted to the participation in the contest was held, revealing that Vladislav Krutskikh and "Street Magic" was selected to represent Russia in the 2005 contest with the song "Doroga k solntsu". The song was written by Kim Breitburg, Artyom Kavaleryan and Vlad Krutskikh himself, and was premiered on the Telekanal Rossiya channel that day (most likely to be during a broadcast of Spokoynoy nochi, malyshi!).

== At Junior Eurovision ==
During the allocation draw, Russia was drawn to perform 7th, following Sweden and preceding Macedonia. Russia placed 9th, scoring 66 points.

Vladislav Krutskikh was joined on stage by three boys and two girls from Street Magic's dance troupe: Vsevolod Tarasov, Daria Gorskaya, Denis Uskov, Maria Pestunova and Vladislav Geshele.

In Russia, show were broadcast on Rossiya with commentary by Yuri Nikolaev. The Russian spokesperson revealing the result of the Russian vote was Roman Kerimov.

=== Voting ===
Points awarded to Russia
Score	Country
12 points (Note: All countries received one set of 12 points to ensure no country finished with nul points.)	Belarus
10 points	Latvia
8 points	
7 points	
6 points	Spain
5 points	Greece; Norway
4 points	Romania
3 points	Belgium; Cyprus
2 points	United Kingdom
1 point	Denmark; Macedonia; Malta; Serbia and Montenegro

Points awarded by Russia
Score	Country
12 points	Belarus
10 points	Macedonia
8 points	Spain
7 points	Greece
6 points	Denmark
5 points	Latvia
4 points	Netherlands
3 points	Romania
2 points	Norway
1 point	United Kingdom
