= Serbia and Montenegro in the Junior Eurovision Song Contest =

- Junior Eurovision Song Contest
- Participating broadcaster: Udruženje javnih radija i televizija (UJRT)

Participation summary
- Appearances: 1
- First appearance: 2005
- Last appearance: 2005
- Highest placement: 13th: 2005
- Participation history: 2005

External links
- Serbia and Montenegro's page at JuniorEurovision.tv

The State Union of Serbia and Montenegro was represented at the Junior Eurovision Song Contest once, in 2005. The Serbian-Montenegrin participating broadcaster in the contest was Udruženje javnih radija i televizija (UJRT). Its only entry "Ljubav pa fudbal" by Filip Vučić, finished 13th. Following the country's dissolution in 2006, the broadcaster was closed. Since then Serbia and Montenegro have participated in the contest as separate entities; with Radio Television of Serbia (RTS) debuting in 2006 and Radio i Televizija Crne Gore (RTCG) in 2014.

== Background ==
Prior to 2005, Serbia and Montenegro had broadcast the 2003 contest.

On 2 August 2005, it was announced that Serbia and Montenegro were to make their debut at the Junior Eurovision Song Contest 2005, at the Ethias Arena in Hasselt, Belgium on 26 November 2005. The national broadcasters Radio Television of Serbia (RTS) and Radio Televizija Crne Gore (RTCG) who are members of the European Broadcasting Union (EBU) was responsible for their debut participation in what would become the one and only time they competed as a nation in the Junior Eurovision Song Contest, prior to the Montenegrin independence referendum in 2006.

Following the dissolution of Serbia and Montenegro, both would go on to compete at the Junior Eurovision Song Contest as Serbia in the Junior Eurovision Song Contest from 2006, and Montenegro in the Junior Eurovision Song Contest from 2014. Neustrašivi učitelji stranih jezika went on to being Serbia's first participant in 2006 as an independent nation, whilst child-duo Maša Vujadinović and Lejla Vulić represented Montenegro in 2014.

== Junior Eurovision Song Contest 2005 ==
=== Junior Beovizija 2005 ===
A national selection event entitled Junior Beovizija took place on 29 September 2005, which saw eighteen entries compete to become the first and last participant for Serbia and Montenegro. Filip Vučić won the national final with the song "Ljubav pa fudbal", achieving a score of fifty-eight points.

Table key
1	First place
2	Second place
3	Third place
◁	Last place

Draw	Artist	Song	Language	Points	Place
01	Katarina Ostojić	"Košava" (Кошава)	Serbian	1	18
02	Tea Kostić-Janković	"U snežnoj noći" (У снежној ноћи)	Serbian	17	10
03	Nevena Majdevac	"Da sam dobra vila" (Да сaм добра вила)	Serbian	17	10
04	Filip Vučić	"Ljubav pa fudbal" (Љубав па фудбал)	Montenegrin	58	1
05	Darja Srećković	"Sećanja" (Сећања)	Serbian	6	15
06	Aleksandra Mitrović	"Slanik i salveta" (Сланик и салвета)	Serbian	17	10
07	Jana Škobić and Andrea Osterbenk	"Šta je sreća" (Шта је срећа)	Serbian	3	16
08	Filip and Vladimir Čabak	"Neznalica" (Незналица)	Serbian	19	9
09	Sanja Jovanović	"Zvezdin sjaj" (Звездин сјај)	Serbian	40	3
10	Marija Ugrica	"Geografija" (Географија)	Serbian	10	13
11	Stefan Đoković	"Pesma otvara vrata" (Песма отвара врата)	Serbian	23	8
12	Kristina Mihajlovski	"Tragom zvezda snenih" (Трагом звезда снених)	Serbian	54	2
13	Jovan Jovović	"Grade moj" (Граде мој)	Serbian	33	6
14	Filip Trajanovski	"Ti uvek bićeš moja" (Ти увек бићеш моја)	Serbian	34	5
15	Danica Zečević	"Uzalud su snovi" (Узалуд су снови)	Serbian	8	14
16	Olivera Vitorović	"Pčelica i med" (Пчелица и мед)	Serbian	28	7
17	Anđela Đurović	"Noć puna želja" (Ноћ пуна жеља)	Serbian	35	4
18	Firuca Cina	"Šta sanjaju dečaci" (Шта сањају дечаци)	Serbian	3	16

=== At Junior Eurovision ===
At the running order draw which took place on 17 November 2005, Serbia and Montenegro were drawn to perform tenth during the live televised final on 26 November 2005, following Netherlands and preceding Latvia.

==== Participation ====
Year	Artist	Song	Language	Place	Points
2005	Filip Vučić	"Ljubav pa fudbal" (Љубав па фудбал)	Montenegrin	13	29

==== Voting ====
During the voting presentation at the 2005 contest, Serbia and Montenegro awarded and was awarded the following points:

Points awarded to Serbia and Montenegro
Score	Country
12 points (Note: All countries received one set of 12 points to ensure no country finished with 0 points.)	
10 points	Macedonia
8 points	
7 points	
6 points	Croatia
5 points	
4 points	
3 points	
2 points	
1 point	Cyprus

Points awarded by Serbia and Montenegro
Score	Country
12 points	Spain
10 points	Macedonia
8 points	Belarus
7 points	Romania
6 points	Croatia
5 points	Denmark
4 points	Greece
3 points	Norway
2 points	Latvia
1 point	Russia

== Commentators and spokespersons ==
The contests are broadcast online worldwide through the official Junior Eurovision Song Contest website junioreurovision.tv and YouTube. In 2015, the online broadcasts featured commentary in English by junioreurovision.tv editor Luke Fisher and 2011 Bulgarian Junior Eurovision Song Contest entrant Ivan Ivanov. The broadcasters from Serbia and Montenegro, RTS and RTCG, sent their own commentators to the contest in order to provide commentary in the Serbian language (for RTS) and Montenegrin language (for RTCG). Spokespersons were also chosen by the national broadcaster in order to announce the awarding points from Serbia and Montenegro. The table below list the details of each commentator and spokesperson since 2005.

Year(s)	Commentator	Spokesperson
2003	Unknown	Did not participate
2004	No broadcast	Did not participate
2005	Duška Vučinić-Lučić	Jovana Vukčević

== See also ==
- Montenegro in the Junior Eurovision Song Contest
- Serbia in the Junior Eurovision Song Contest
- Serbia and Montenegro in the Eurovision Song Contest
