= Romania in the Junior Eurovision Song Contest 2005 =

- Junior Eurovision Song Contest 2005
- Participating broadcaster: Televiziunea Română (TVR)
- Country: Romania
- Selection process: Selecția Națională Eurovision Junior 2005
- Selection date: 20 August 2005

Competing entry
- Song: "Țurai!"
- Artist: Alina Eremia
- Songwriter: Alina Eremia

Placement
- Final result: 5th, 89 points

Participation chronology

Romania was represented at the Junior Eurovision Song Contest 2005 with the song "Țurai!", written and performed by Alina Eremia. The Romanian participating broadcaster, Televiziunea Română (TVR), selected its entry for the contest through Selecția Națională Eurovision Junior 2005.

== Before Junior Eurovision ==
=== Selecția Națională Eurovision Junior 2005 ===
Televiziunea Română (TVR) opened the submission window for Selecția Națională Eurovision Junior 2005 on 15 June 2005 and closed on 15 July 2005. By the submission window deadline, 25 entries were received.

The songs were judged from 16 to 20 July 2005 by a jury. Originally, five entries were disqualified and the remaining twenty would be the finalists but after a double check, three more entries were disqualified, which left with seventeen finalists. The seventeen finalists were announced on 21 July 2005, with the songs being released on 10 August 2005.

On 15 August 2005, it was announced that Rockids with the song "Ce să fac?" would be disqualified due to the lead singer Bubu having previously represented Romania in the Junior Eurovision Song Contest 2003 and having a solo role on a professionally produced CD, making the final have sixteen participants.

The final took place on 20 August 2005 at 16:00 CEST and broadcast on TVR 1. The hosts and guest performers of the show were Alina Sorescu and Noni Răzvan Ene. The results were decided by 50% jury and 50% televote. The jury consisted of Alexandra Cepraga, Anton Șuteu, Beatrice Soare, Corina Despot and Titus Andrei. The winning song "Țurai" by Alina Eremia received 12 points from all of the juries. The only two known running order spots are that Alina Eremia with "Țurai" performed fourteenth and Dragoș Bistriceanu with "România!!!".

Final – 20 August 2005
Artist	Song	Jury	Televote		Total	Place
Artist	Song	Points	Votes	Points	Total	Place
Alina Eremia	"Țurai"	60	958	60	120	1
Ana Maria Gergely	"Zâmbet da copil"	1	159	0	1	14
Andreea Trandafir	"Ciocolata"	19	242	30	49	6
Andrei Alexandru Tiba	"Suflet de copil"	0	164	0	0	15
Bebinela	"Glie străbună"	4	228	25	29	9
Dana Mareș	"Cântă!"	8	168	0	8	12
Dragoș Bistriceanu	"România!!!"	20	310	35	55	4
Gabriel Ciocan	"Prietenul meu"	8	94	0	8	12
Gabriela Bugle	"Trenul vacanței"	47	187	5	52	5
Georgina Florentina Bere	"Aș vrea să fiu o vedetă"	0	61	0	0	15
Gloria Melu	"Româncuță"	17	200	20	37	7
New Star Music	"Rock-ul se cântă așa"	32	378	40	72	2
Patricia Matei	"Muzica e tot ce am"	26	85	0	26	10
Silviu Mihăilă	"Speranța"	19	620	52	71	3
Sonia Petra Dumitru	"Dar nu-i nimic"	20	197	15	35	8
Trio	"Cântec cu chitară"	7	188	10	17	11

== At Junior Eurovision ==
At the running order draw, Romania were drawn to perform fourth on 26 November 2005, following Croatia and preceding United Kingdom.

=== Voting ===
Points awarded to Romania
Score	Country
12 points (Note: All countries received one set of 12 points to ensure no country finished with nul points.)	Spain
10 points	Cyprus; Greece
8 points	
7 points	Norway; Serbia and Montenegro
6 points	
5 points	Netherlands
4 points	Belgium; Macedonia; Sweden
3 points	Belarus; Latvia; Russia; United Kingdom
2 points	Croatia
1 point	

Points awarded by Romania
Score	Country
12 points	Spain
10 points	Belarus
8 points	Macedonia
7 points	Belgium
6 points	Greece
5 points	Norway
4 points	Russia
3 points	Denmark
2 points	Netherlands
1 point	Latvia
