= Macedonia in the Junior Eurovision Song Contest 2005 =

- Junior Eurovision Song Contest 2005
- Participating broadcaster: Macedonian Radio Television (MRT)
- Country: Macedonia
- Selection process: National final
- Selection date: 17 September 2005

Competing entry
- Song: "Rodendenski baknež"
- Artist: Denis Dimoski
- Songwriter: Stefan Krstevski

Placement
- Final result: 8th, 68 points

Participation chronology

Macedonia (Note: Presented under the provisional appellation "former Yugoslav Republic of Macedonia", abbreviated "FYR Macedonia".) was represented at the Junior Eurovision Song Contest 2005 with the song "Rodendenski baknež", written by Stefan Krstevski, and performed by Denis Dimoski. The Macedonian participating broadcaster, Macedonian Radio Television (MRT), selected its entry for the contest through a national final.

== Before Junior Eurovision ==
=== National final ===
From the ten originally selected song for the national final, four of them were disqualified. Macedonian Radio Television (MRT) originally scheduled the national final to be held on 26 June 2005 but it was rescheduled to September.

The final was held on 17 September 2005 in Studio 3 of MRT at 17:00 CET and was broadcast on MTV 1. The hosts were Marija, Dušan, Marija and Mimica. There were 10 participants and the results were decided by 40% jury and 60% televoting that was open for 10 minutes. The jury consisted of Aleksandar Džambazov, Martina Siljanovska, Aleksandar Masevski, Tamara Todevska, Zoran Angelković and Tatjana Laskovska (without the right to vote). The running order is unknown except that Denis Dimoski with "Rodendenski baknež" performed ninth and Milanka Noveska with "Omilena" performed tenth.

Final - 17 September 2005
| Artist | Song | Jury | Televote | | Total | Place |
| Artist | Song | Jury | Votes | Points | Total | Place |
|---|---|---|---|---|---|---|
| Denis Dimoski | "Rodendenski baknež" ("Роденденски бакнеж") | 40 | 318 | 45 | 85 | 1 |
| Despina Spirovska | "Ljubov bez granici" ("Љубов вез граници") | 10 | 48 | 15 | 25 | 9 |
| Ivana and Vojdan | "Jas i ti" ("Јас и ти") | 24 | 1,498 | 60 | 84 | 2 |
| Kristina Milosevska | "Zapej mi" ("Запеј ми") | 28 | 461 | 50 | 78 | 3 |
| Milanka Noveska | "Mojot son" ("Мојот сон") | 36 | 244 | 40 | 76 | 4 |
| Pandelina Atanasova | "Magija da napravam" ("Магија да направам") | 18 | 79 | 20 | 38 | 8 |
| Petar Gjurevski | "Daj mi nekoj znak" ("Дај ми некој знак") | 32 | 201 | 25 | 57 | 5 |
| Robert Mitrov | "Kade da te pronajdam" ("Каде да те пронајдам") | 21 | 237 | 35 | 56 | 6 |
| Simona Dimitrova | "Silen ritam" ("Силен ритам") | 12 | 236 | 30 | 42 | 7 |
| Stefani Brzanova | "Detska fantazija" ("Детска фантазија") | 15 | 21 | 10 | 25 | 10 |

== At Junior Eurovision ==
At the running order draw, Macedonia were drawn to perform ninth on 26 November 2005, following Russia and preceding the Netherlands.

=== Voting ===
Points awarded to Macedonia
| Score | Country |
|---|---|
| 12 points (Note: All countries received one set of 12 points to ensure no country finished with nul points.) | |
| 10 points | Russia Serbia and Montenegro |
| 8 points | Belarus Romania |
| 7 points | |
| 6 points | |
| 5 points | |
| 4 points | Croatia Latvia United Kingdom |
| 3 points | Netherlands |
| 2 points | Malta |
| 1 point | Belgium Spain Sweden |

Points awarded by Macedonia
| Score | Country |
|---|---|
| 12 points | Denmark |
| 10 points | Serbia and Montenegro |
| 8 points | Croatia |
| 7 points | Belarus |
| 6 points | Spain |
| 5 points | Norway |
| 4 points | Romania |
| 3 points | Greece |
| 2 points | Latvia |
| 1 point | Russia |
