= Cyprus in the Junior Eurovision Song Contest 2005 =

- Junior Eurovision Song Contest 2005
- Participating broadcaster: Cyprus Broadcasting Corporation (CyBC)
- Country: Cyprus
- Selection process: National final
- Selection date: 16 September 2005

Competing entry
- Song: "Tsirko"
- Artist: Rena Kiriakidi
- Songwriter: Rena Kiriakidi

Placement
- Final result: Withdrawn

Participation chronology

Cyprus was to be represented at the Junior Eurovision Song Contest 2005 with the song "Tsirko", performed by Rena Kiriakidi. The Cypriot participating broadcaster, the Cyprus Broadcasting Corporation (CyBC), selected its entry for the contest through a national final. On 13 October 2005, it was announced that Cyprus would withdraw from the contest due to the parental pressure on them about plagiarism claims.

== Before Junior Eurovision ==
=== National final ===
By the deadline, 47 submissions were received. The ten finalists were decided by a 5-member jury. On 16 June 2005, the ten finalists of the national final were revealed.

The final was originally supposed to be held on 9 September 2005 but was rescheduled to a week later.

The final was held on 16 September 2005 at 20:00 CEST in RIK Studios and broadcast on RIK 1 and RIK Sat. The results were decided by only televoting. Guest performers included 4Play and Marios Tofi.

Final – 16 September 2005
R/O	Artist	Song	Songwriter	Votes	Place
1	Stella-Maria Koukidi	"Pera apo ti thalassa" ("Πέρα από τη θάλασσα")	Stella-Maria Koukidi	1,175	9
2	Popi Christodoulou	"Thelo to oniro na zo" ("Θέλω το όνειρο να ζω")	Popi Christodoulou	729	10
3	Luis Panagiotou	"Fantasia" ("Φαντασία")	Luis Panagiotou	3,144	2
4	Luis Georgiou	"Eisai pantou" ("Είσαι παντού")	Luis Georgiou	1,583	7
5	Nicole Paparistodemou	"Zali ksafniki" ("Ζάλη ξαφνική")	Nicole Paparistodemou	1,292	8
6	Christina Christofi	"Tha eisai edo" ("Θα είσαι εδώ")	Christina Christofi	2,359	4
7	Rena Kiriakidi	"Tsirko" ("Τσίρκο")	Rena Kiriakidi	4,679	1
8	Katerina Tofia	"Agapa ti zoi" ("Αγάπα τη ζωή")	Katerina Tofia	1,855	5
9	Christos Mylordos	"I ora pige mia" ("Η ώρα πήγε μία")	Christos Mylordos	3,005	3
10	Christina Averkiou	"As ftiaksoume ton kosmo ksana" ("Ας φτιάξουμε τον κόσμο ξανά")	Christina Averkiou	1,682	6

=== Withdrawal ===
The plagiarism accusations of "Tsirko" started when the parents of the participants protested against CyBC claiming the song was a copy of "Tragouda theatrine" by Tolis Voskopoulos. Due to the protests, CyBC examined the case.

During the running order draw on 13 October 2005, it was announced that Cyprus would withdraw due to the pressure under the parental claims about the plagiarism of "Tsirko".

== At Junior Eurovision ==
Although, Cyprus withdrew from the contest, they still broadcast the show and voted in the contest.

Points awarded by Cyprus
Score	Country
12 points	Greece
10 points	Romania
8 points	Spain
7 points	Belarus
6 points	Denmark
5 points	Norway
4 points	Belgium
3 points	Russia
2 points	Netherlands
1 point	Serbia and Montenegro
