= Malta in the Junior Eurovision Song Contest 2005 =

- Junior Eurovision Song Contest 2005
- Participating broadcaster: Public Broadcasting Services (PBS)
- Country: Malta
- Selection process: Junior Song for Europe 2005
- Selection date: 24 September 2005

Competing entry
- Song: "Make It Right!"
- Artist: Thea and Friends
- Songwriter: Thea Saliba

Placement
- Final result: 16th, 18 points

Participation chronology

Malta was represented at the Junior Eurovision Song Contest 2005 with the song "Make It Right!", written by Thea Saliba performed by Thea and Friends. The Maltese participating broadcaster, Public Broadcasting Services (PBS), selected its entry for the contest through Junior Song for Europe 2005.

== Before Junior Eurovision ==
The Public Broadcasting Services (PBS) opened the submission window for Junior Song for Europe 2005 on 13 July 2005. The submission window deadline was originally 3 August 2005 but was extended to 16 August 2005. By the submission window deadline, a record 146 entries were received.

The first phase took place on 26 and 27 August 2005, with the entries being judged by a panel of jury. From the first phase, 60 entries were selected to the second phase.

The second phase took place on 3 September 2005 at the Golden Tulip Vivaldi Hotel, St. Julian's. The entries were performed live in the afternoon and judged by a different panel of jury. From the phase, sixteen finalists were chosen, which were revealed on 5 September 2005.

The final took place on 24 September 2005 at 20:40 CEST in the Sir Temi Zammit Hall in University of Malta and was broadcast on TVM. The results were decided by jury and televoting. Guest performers included Young Talent Team with "Bikja Ohra 179".

Final – 24 September 2005
R/O	Artist	Song	Songwriter(s)	Points	Place
1	Ryan Abela	"My Wish"	Ryan Abela	51	13
2	Jeanise Bonnici	"My Secret Friend"	Jeanise Bonnici	50	14
3	Thea and Friends	"Make It Right!"	Thea Saliba	128	1
4	Kristina Camilleri Burlo'	"The World as One"	Kristina Camilleri Burlo'	67	11
5	Raisa Piscopo	"Nature Powers"	Raisa Piscopo	107	5
6	Sophie and Damian	"Kids Rule"	Sophie Debattista	117	2
7	Louanne Carauna	"Rock 'n' Roll Girl"	Louanne Carauna	54	12
8	Brooke Borg	"Forever Love"	Brooke Borg	103	6
9	Vanessa Ann Gatt	"The Real Me"	Vanessa Ann Gatt	46	15
10	Domenique Azzopardi	"It's Time to Party"	Domenique Azzopardi	114	3
11	Kylie Coleiro	"Creatures of God"	Kylie Coleiro	91	7
12	Christabelle Borg	"Going Wild"	Christabelle Borg; Giselle Spiteri	110	4
13	Klinsmann Coleiro	"Time Is Running Out"	Klinsmann Coleiro	78	9
14	Deborah Cassar	"Closer"	Deborah Cassar	69	10
15	Francesca Zarb	"Lucky Star"	Francesca Zarb	46	15
16	She 2s	"Got 2b 2's"	Victoria Schembri	83	8

== At Junior Eurovision ==
At the running order draw, Malta were drawn to perform thirteenth on 26 November 2005, following Belgium and preceding Norway.

=== Voting ===
Points awarded to Malta
Score	Country
12 points (Note: All countries received one set of 12 points to ensure no country finished with nul points.)	
10 points	
8 points	
7 points	
6 points	
5 points	Denmark
4 points	
3 points	
2 points	
1 point	Greece

Points awarded by Malta
Score	Country
12 points	Belarus
10 points	Norway
8 points	Netherlands
7 points	Denmark
6 points	Spain
5 points	United Kingdom
4 points	Belgium
3 points	Latvia
2 points	Macedonia
1 point	Russia
