= Belgium in the Junior Eurovision Song Contest 2005 =

- Junior Eurovision Song Contest 2005
- Participating broadcaster: Vlaamse Radio- en Televisieomroeporganisatie (VRT); Radio-télévision belge de la Communauté française (RTBF)
- Country: Belgium
- Selection process: Eurokids 2005
- Selection date: 18 September 2005

Competing entry
- Song: "Mes rêves"
- Artist: Lindsay
- Songwriter: Lindsay Daenen

Placement
- Final result: 10th, 63 points

Participation chronology

Belgium was represented at the Junior Eurovision Song Contest 2005 with the song "Mes rêves", written and performed by Lindsay. The Belgian participating broadcasters, Vlaamse Radio- en Televisieomroeporganisatie (VRT) and Radio-télévision belge de la Communauté française (RTBF), selected their entry through Eurokids 2005. In addition, VRT and RTBF were also the host broadcasters and staged the event at the Ethias Arena in Hasselt.

== Before Junior Eurovision ==
=== Eurokids 2005 ===
Eurokids 2005 was the national final for Belgium at the Junior Eurovision Song Contest 2005, organised by the two Belgian broadcasters: Flemish broadcaster Vlaamse Radio- en Televisieomroeporganisatie (VRT) and Walloon broadcaster Radio-télévision belge de la Communauté française (RTBF).

The submission window of Eurokids 2005 was opened on 22 November 2004 and closed on 1 February 2005. By the deadline, 874 entries were received. From the submission 30 Dutch speaking participants and 30 French speaking participants were invited to the auditions. The auditions took place on 18, 19 and 20 February 2005 in Brussels, where the 12 participants for Eurokids 2005 were chosen, which were revealed in a press conference on 1 June 2005. The running order of the Semi-finals were revealed on 28 August 2005.

All of the shows were hosted by Ilse Van Hoecke, Jean-Louis Lahaye, Maureen Louys and Jelle Cleymans. The common song was "Yakalee yakalea".

==== Format ====
The format of the competition consisted of three shows: two semi-finals and a final. Each broadcaster chose six songs to compete, with the final winner representing Belgium at the contest. From the semi-finals, the best scoring three French speaking and three Dutch speaking participants advanced to the final. In all shows, the results were based on the votes from a four-member adult "expert" jury, a kids jury, a radio jury and televoting. The televote counted for 2/5 of the overall vote, with the other 3 juries counting for 1/5. The "expert" jury consisted of two members from Flanders and another two from Wallonia: Marcel Vanthilt, André Vermeulen, Mélanie Cohl and Viktor Lazlo.

==== Semi-final 1 ====
The first semi-final took place on 4 September 2005 and was broadcast on Één (Note: With Dutch subtitles during the parts where French was spoken) and La Une. The interval act was performed by Gene Thomas. (Note: An ad break was shown during the interval act on La Une broadcast.)

Semi-final 1 (4 September 2005)
R/O	Artist	Song	Language	Jury	Televote	Points	Place
1	Les Opposées	"J'en ai marre"	French	26	14	40	6
2	Max	"Voor eeuwig"	Dutch	30	22	52	1
3	Marie	"Non, stop"	French	31	16	47	4
4	Jess 'n Emmy	"Een gevoel"	Dutch	30	20	50	2
5	Nicolas	"Le nez dans les étoiles"	French	28	18	46	5
6	qROCKmadam	"Grenzen"	Dutch	26	24	50	2

Detailed Jury Votes
R/O	Song	Expert Jury	Kids Jury	Radio Jury	Total
1	"J'en ai marre"	7	8	11	26
2	"Voor eeuwig"	11	12	7	30
3	"Non, stop"	8	11	12	31
4	"Een gevoel"	10	10	10	30
5	"Le nez dans les étoiles"	12	7	9	28
6	"Grenzen"	9	9	8	26

==== Semi-final 2 ====
The second semi-final took place on 11 September 2005 and was broadcast on Één and La Une. The interval act was performed by Clouseau with "Geef het op".

Semi-final 2 (11 September 2005)
R/O	Artist	Song	Language	Jury	Televote	Points	Place
1	Lila	"Een dagje uit"	Dutch	30	18	48	2
2	Mélanie	"Une fille ordinaire"	French	27	14	41	6
3	Matt	"De allermooiste van de klas"	Dutch	22	22	44	4
4	Céline	"Pourquoi"	French	28	20	48	3
5	Abigail	"Huisparty"	Dutch	28	16	44	4
6	Lindsay	"Mes rêves"	French	36	24	60	1

Detailed Jury Votes
R/O	Song	Expert Jury	Kids Jury	Radio Jury	Total
1	"Een dagje uit"	10	10	10	30
2	"Une fille ordinaire"	9	7	11	27
3	"De allermooiste van de klas"	7	8	7	22
4	"Pourquoi"	11	11	8	28
5	"Huisparty"	8	9	9	28
6	"Mes rêves"	12	12	12	36

==== Final ====
The final was held on 18 September 2005 at 20:15 CEST and was broadcast on Één and La Une. The winner was "Mes rêves" performed by Lindsay. The interval act was performed by X!NK.

Final (18 September 2005)
R/O	Artist	Song	Jury	Televote	Total	Place
1	Marie	"Non, stop"	28	14	42	5
2	Jess 'n Emmy	"Een gevoel"	26	18	44	4
3	Céline	"Pourquoi"	25	16	41	6
4	qROCKmadam	"Grenzen"	25	20	45	3
5	Lindsay	"Mes rêves"	36	24	60	1
6	Max	"Voor eeuwig"	31	22	53	2

Detailed Jury Votes
R/O	Song	Expert Jury	Kids Jury	Radio Jury	Total
1	"Non, stop"	10	7	11	28
2	"Een gevoel"	9	9	8	26
3	"Pourquoi"	7	8	10	25
4	"Grenzen"	8	10	7	25
5	"Mes rêves"	12	12	12	36
6	"Voor eeuwig"	11	11	9	31

== At Junior Eurovision ==
At Junior Eurovision, Belgium performed in twelfth position, before Malta and after Latvia. Belgium placed in 10th position with 63 points; the highest of which was 12 points, which came from the Netherlands.

=== Voting ===
Points awarded to Belgium
Score	Country
12 points (Note: All countries received one set of 12 points to ensure no country finished with nul points.)	Netherlands
10 points	
8 points	Norway
7 points	Latvia; Romania
6 points	
5 points	Spain
4 points	Cyprus; Malta
3 points	
2 points	Greece
1 point	Belarus; Croatia

Points awarded by Belgium
Score	Country
12 points	Netherlands
10 points	Spain
8 points	Denmark
7 points	Norway
6 points	Greece
5 points	Belarus
4 points	Romania
3 points	Russia
2 points	United Kingdom
1 point	Macedonia
