= Croatia in the Junior Eurovision Song Contest 2005 =

- Junior Eurovision Song Contest 2005
- Participating broadcaster: Hrvatska radiotelevizija (HRT)
- Country: Croatia
- Selection process: 3. Izbor za Dječju Pjesmu Eurovizije 2005
- Selection date: 3 July 2005

Competing entry
- Song: "Rock Baby"
- Artist: Lorena Jelusić
- Songwriter: Lorena Jelusić

Placement
- Final result: 12th, 36 points

Participation chronology

Croatia was represented at the Junior Eurovision Song Contest 2005 with the song "Rock Baby", written and performed by Lorena Jelusić. The Croatian participating broadcaster, Hrvatska radiotelevizija (HRT), organised an national final to select its entry for the contest.

== Before Junior Eurovision ==
=== 3. Izbor za Dječju Pjesmu Eurovizije 2005 ===
3. Izbor za Dječju Pjesmu Eurovizije 2005 was the third edition of the national selection organised by Hrvatska radiotelevizija (HRT) to select its entry for the Junior Eurovision Song Contest 2005.

==== Competing entries ====
Artists and composers were able to submit their entries to the broadcaster. An expert committee consisting of Nensi Atanasov, Helena Bastić, Davor Gobac, Željen Klašterka, Mladen Kušec, Marin Margitić and Nika Turković selected ten artists and songs for the competition from the received submissions, which were revealed on 25 May 2005.

==== Final ====
The final took place on 3 July 2005 at 17:30 CEST in HRT's Anton Marti Studio and was broadcast on HRT 1. The show was hosted by Iva Sulentić and Robert Bošković. The winner was determined by regional televoting. For the first time in the history of Croatia's Junior Eurovision selection, the orchestra was dropped and the finalists sang to pre-recorded instrumentation, but were accompanied by in-studio backup singers. Guest performers included Nika Turković opening with "Hey little boy", the English version of "Hej mali", with interval acts being Vanna with "Strings of My Heart", Dino Jelusić with "Ramona" and him and Davor Gobac with "Ti si moja prva ljubav".

Final – 3 July 2005
R/O	Artist	Song	Songwriter	Points	Place
1	Kim Verson	"Sretno dijete"	Kim Verson	23	5
2	Sarah Posavac	"San"	Sarah Posavac	8	10
3	Lorena Jelusić	"Rock Baby"	Lorena Jelusić	36	1
4	Kristina and Valentina Bralo	"Pleši"	Kristina Bralo	30	3
5	Lamia Belošević	"Prijateljica"	Lamia Beloševic	25	4
6	Mia Maltar	"Ah ta ljubav"	Mia Maltar	31	2
7	Ana and Matea Madunić	"Probudi se"	Matea Madunić	10	9
8	Kristina Jarić and Valentina Durić	"Peti element"	Kristina Jarić	21	6
9	Filip Ratković	"Mary Bye, Bye, Bye"	Filip Ratković	16	8
10	Lucija Lučić	"Mikrofon"	Lucija Lučić	20	7

Detailed Regional Televoting Results
R/O	Song	Slavonia	Dalmatia	Istria	Central Croatia	Total
1	"Sretno dijete"	10	4	5	4	23
2	"San"	2	1	4	1	8
3	"Rock Baby"	9	8	9	10	36
4	"Pleši"	7	9	8	6	30
5	"Prijateljica"	6	6	6	7	25
6	"Ah ta ljubav"	8	7	7	9	31
7	"Probudi se"	4	2	2	2	10
8	"Peti element"	5	3	10	3	21
9	"Mary Bye, Bye, Bye"	3	5	3	5	16
10	"Mikrofon"	1	10	1	8	20

== At Junior Eurovision ==
=== Voting ===
Points awarded to Croatia
Score	Country
12 points (Note: All countries received one set of 12 points to ensure no country finished with nul points.)	
10 points	
8 points	Macedonia
7 points	
6 points	Serbia and Montenegro
5 points	
4 points	
3 points	Norway; Sweden
2 points	Denmark; Netherlands
1 point	

Points awarded by Croatia
Score	Country
12 points	Greece
10 points	Belarus
8 points	Denmark
7 points	Spain
6 points	Serbia and Montenegro
5 points	Latvia
4 points	Macedonia
3 points	Norway
2 points	Romania
1 point	Belgium
