= Denmark in the Junior Eurovision Song Contest 2005 =

- Junior Eurovision Song Contest 2005
- Country: Denmark
- Selection process: MGP 2005
- Selection date: 17 September 2005

Competing entry
- Song: "Shake Shake Shake"
- Artist: Nicolai Kielstrup

Placement
- Final result: 4th, 121 points

Participation chronology

Denmark was represented at the Junior Eurovision Song Contest 2005, sending their third entry to the contest. The Danish entry was Nicolai Kielstrup with the song "Shake Shake Shake", which was the winner of the Danish national selection MGP 2005.

== Before Junior Eurovision ==
=== MGP 2005 ===
DR held the 6th edition of the MGP contest on 17 September 2005 to select the Danish entry to the Junior Eurovision Song Contest.

The final was held at the DR TV Studios in Copenhagen, hosted by Jacob Riising. The winner was chosen through two rounds of televoting and SMS voting: firstly, the top 5 songs were selected from the 10 competing songs to progress to the superfinal, where the final winner was chosen through another round of televoting. The votes were distributed among a number of regions, who gave points to each song.

The winner was Nicolai Kielstrup with his song "Shake Shake Shake", receiving 96 points.

Final – 17 September 2005
Draw	Artist	Song	Result
1	Annisette & Nanna	"Venindetanker"	Eliminated
2	Marieke	"Musikken"	Eliminated
3	Lucas	"Fest her"	Superfinalist
4	Jeans	"Jeg ka' nemli' godt li' dig"	Eliminated
5	Karoline & Zoe	"Et stjerneskud"	Eliminated
6	L.B.S.	"Supermand"	Superfinalist
7	Signe K	"Kære fru lærer"	Superfinalist
8	Twiz	"Du må forstå"	Superfinalist
9	Julia	"Sol og sommer"	Eliminated
10	Nicolai	"Shake Shake Shake"	Superfinalist

Superfinal – 17 September 2005
Draw	Artist	Song	Jutland		Funen		Zealand & Islands		Greater Copenhagen		Total	Place
Draw	Artist	Song	Telephone	SMS	Telephone	SMS	Telephone	SMS	Telephone	SMS	Total	Place
1	Lucas	"Fest her"	6	6	6	4	6	10	10	10	58	4
2	L.B.S.	"Supermand"	4	4	8	10	4	4	4	4	42	5
3	Signe K	"Kære fru lærer"	8	8	10	6	10	6	8	8	64	2
4	Twiz	"Du må forstå"	10	10	4	8	8	8	8	6	60	3
5	Nicolai	"Shake Shake Shake"	12	12	12	12	12	12	12	12	96	1

== At Junior Eurovision ==
Nicolai performed 2nd in the running order of the contest, held in Hasselt, Belgium, following Greece and preceding Croatia. At the close of the voting Denmark received 121 points, placing 4th of the 16 competing entries, Denmark's best placing at the contest.

=== Voting ===
Points awarded to Denmark
Score	Country
12 points (Note: All countries received one set of 12 points to ensure no country finished with nul points.)	Macedonia; Norway
10 points	Sweden
8 points	Belgium; Croatia
7 points	Greece; Malta; Netherlands; Spain
6 points	Cyprus; Latvia; Russia
5 points	Serbia and Montenegro
4 points	Belarus
3 points	Romania
2 points	
1 point	United Kingdom

Points awarded by Denmark
Score	Country
12 points	Norway
10 points	Netherlands
8 points	Sweden
7 points	Greece
6 points	Belarus
5 points	Malta
4 points	Spain
3 points	United Kingdom
2 points	Croatia
1 point	Russia
