= Junior Eurovision Song Contest 2005 =

International song competition for youth

- Let's Get Loud

Date and venue
- Final: 26 November 2005
- Venue: Ethias Arena; Hasselt, Belgium

Organisation
- Organiser: European Broadcasting Union (EBU)
- Executive supervisor: Svante Stockselius

Production
- Host broadcaster: Radio Télévision Belge Francophone (RTBF); Vlaamse Radio- en Televisieomroep (VRT)
- Directors: Yves Podevyn; Ludovic Beun
- Executive producer: Ludo Porrez
- Presenters: Marcel Vanthilt; Maureen Louys

Participants
- Number of entries: 16
- Debuting countries: Russia; Serbia and Montenegro
- Non-returning countries: Cyprus; France; Poland; Switzerland
- Participation map: Participating countries Countries that didn't participate but were allowed to vote Countries that participated in the past but not in 2005

Vote
- Voting system: Each country awards 1–8, 10, and 12 points to their 10 favourite songs
- Winning song: Belarus "My vmeste"

The Junior Eurovision Song Contest 2005 was the third edition of the Junior Eurovision Song Contest, held on 26 November 2005 at the Ethias Arena in Hasselt, Belgium, and presented by Marcel Vanthilt and Maureen Louys. It was organised by the European Broadcasting Union (EBU) and host broadcasters Vlaamse Radio- en Televisieomroep (VRT) and Radio télévision belge de la communauté française (RTBF).

The show was not only broadcast live by the participating broadcasters, it was also available on satellite worldwide and on Australian Special Broadcasting Service (SBS) who acquired the rights to broadcast the show one month later. The theme of the show was Let's Get Loud, standing for the new generation on the stage. The show was watched by 8,500 people in the arena, including the Belgian Prince Laurent and 20–25 million people around Europe.

The winner was Belarus with the song "My vmeste" by 10-year-old Ksenia Sitnik. Previous year's winner Spain finished in second place, with 2004 hosts Norway coming third.

== Location ==
Locations of the known bidding countries. The eliminated countries are marked in red. The chosen host country is marked in blue.

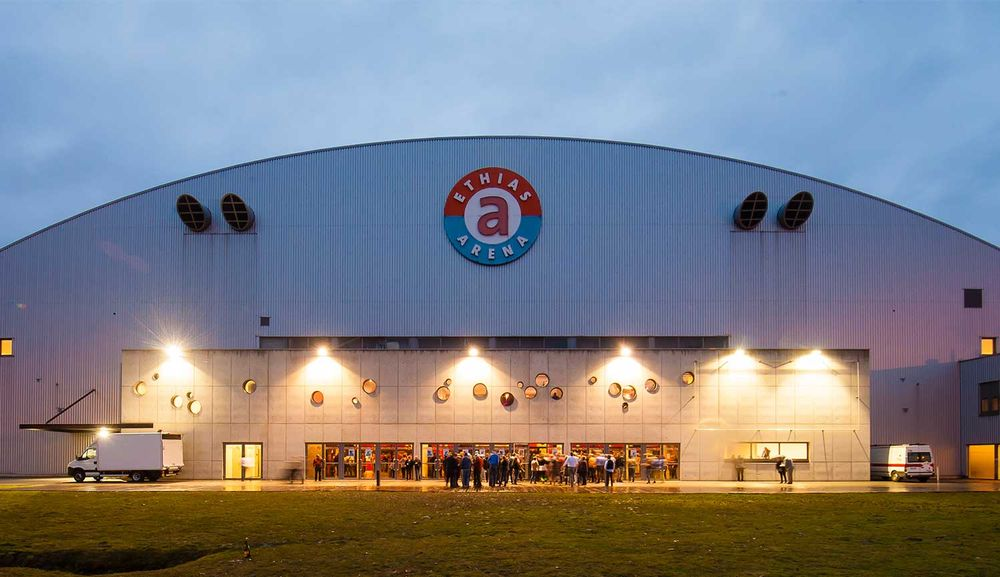
Venue of the 2005 contest: the Ethias Arena in Hasselt

=== Bidding phase and host selection ===
Following the hosting problems for the 2004 edition, the location of the subsequent contests were appointed by the European Broadcasting Union (EBU), following a bidding process with broadcasters from the participating countries. Belgium was therefore the first country to successfully bid for the rights to host the contest in 2005.

In November 2003, there were reports about the possibility to the contest take place in the Netherlands. In the same month, Jeroen Depraetere, coordinator of the show on behalf of the EBU, announced that five countries had expressed their willingness to organise the competition. Belgium won the right to hold the contest in March 2004 over five other countries including Croatian Radiotelevision (HRT) of Croatia and AVRO of the Netherlands.

In November 2004, it was announced that the Flemish city of Hasselt would host the contest at the Ethias Arena. The date of the contest had been confirmed shortly after the 2004 contest in Lillehammer.

=== Venue ===
The Ethias Arena is the largest multi-purpose arena in Hasselt, Belgium which is used for music concerts, sports (tennis, indoor cycling, jumping, etc.) and other large events. The arena opened in September 2004 and holds up to 21,600 people depending on the event. The venue is a part of the Grenslandhallen and has a surface of 13,600 square meters (44,619 square feet). In 2015, it hosted the 2015 European Championship in darts, a Professional Darts Corporation event. The venue would later be renamed to Trixxo Arena.

== Participants ==
Cover art of the official album

In September 2005, the EBU released the initial list of participants with 17 competing countries. Russia and Serbia and Montenegro made their debut, France and Switzerland withdrew after debuting in the 2004 contest, while Poland withdrew after debuting in the 2003 contest.

Cyprus had planned to participate but announced their withdrawal on 13 October 2005, due to an "internal issue" with the selected song, presumably stemming from allegations of plagiarism made against it, reducing the number of participating countries to 16. Despite this, Cypriot viewers were able to watch the show and vote.

Prior to the event, a compilation album featuring all the songs from the 2005 contest, along with karaoke versions, was put together by the European Broadcasting Union and released by Universal Music Group in November 2005.

Participants of the Junior Eurovision Song Contest 2005
Country	Broadcaster	Artist	Song	Language	Songwriter(s)
Belarus	BTRC	Ksenia Sitnik	"My vmeste" (Мы вместе)	Russian	Ksenia Sitnik
Belgium	RTBF; VRT	Lindsay	"Mes rêves"	French	Lindsay Daenen
Croatia	HRT	Lorena Jelusić	"Rock Baby"	Croatian	Lorena Jelusić
Denmark	DR	Nicolai	"Shake Shake Shake"	Danish, English	Nicolai Kielstrup
Greece	ERT	Alexandros and Kalli	"Tora einai i seira mas" (Tώρα είναι η σειρά μας)	Greek	Alexandros Chountas; Kalli Georgelli
Latvia	LTV	Kids4Rock	"Es esmu maza jauka meitene"	Latvian	Monta Beļinska; Daniēls Groza
Macedonia	MRT	Denis Dimoski	"Rodendeski baknež" (Родендески бакнеж)	Macedonian	Stefan Krstevski
Malta	PBS	Thea and Friends	"Make It Right!"	English	Thea Saliba
Netherlands	AVRO	Tess	"Stupid"	Dutch	Tess Gaerthé
Norway	NRK	Malin	"Sommer og skolefri"	Norwegian	Malin Reitan
Romania	TVR	Alina Eremia	"Țurai!" (Note: On-screen captions used the phonetically-spelled title "Tzooray")	Romanian	Alina Eremia
Russia	VGTRK	Vladislav Krutskikh	"Doroga k solntsu" (Дорога к солнцу)	Russian	Kim Breitburg; Artyom Kavaleryan; Vladislav Krutskikh
Serbia and Montenegro	UJRT	Filip Vučić	"Ljubav pa fudbal" (Љубав па фудбал)	Montenegrin	Filip Vučić
Spain	TVE	Antonio José	"Te traigo flores"	Spanish	Antonio José Sánchez Mazuecos
Sweden	SVT	M+	"Gränslös kärlek"	Swedish	Maria Chabo; Maria Josefson
United Kingdom	ITV	Joni Fuller	"How Does It Feel?"	English	Joni Fuller

== Format ==
=== Presenters ===
On 13 October 2005, it was revealed during a presentation that Maureen Louys of RTBF and Marcel Vanthilt of VRT would be the hosts of the contest.

=== Running order ===
The selection of the running order was conducted in two phases. In the first, which took place at the City Hall of Hasselt, there were three draws: one to select the countries that would perform first and last in the contest; a second to decide on the position of the host country; and a third to divided the 14 remaining countries into two groups of five (for the positions 2–6 and 7–11) and one of three (for the positions 13–15).

The second phase of the selection of the running order was conducted by the JESC Steering Group. The group decided on the final positions of the countries within the three groups, taking into account, for example, that no three ballads or no three songs from one European region should be performed consecutively in the contest. This system was already applied last year for the festival in Lillehammer.

=== Voting ===
Voting was the same as the traditional voting system, with each country voting for their 10 favorite songs, with scores of 1–8, 10 and 12. It was the first time points 1 through 5 had automatically appeared on the scoreboard, with spokespeople reading out only points 6, 7, 8, 10 and 12. The presenters started off by giving all contestants 12 points.

== Contest overview ==
The event took place on 26 November 2005 at 20:15 CET. Sixteen countries participated, with the running order published in October 2005. All the countries competing were eligible to vote by televote. Belarus won with 149 points, with Spain, Norway, Denmark, and Romania, completing the top five. Croatia, Serbia and Montenegro, the United Kingdom, Sweden, and Malta occupied the bottom five positions.

The show was opened by a fireworks and bungee jumpers performance. The interval act included Vladik Myagkostupov from Cirque du Soleil gave a four-minute circus performance and 2004 winner María Isabel performing a medley of her winning entry "Antes muerta que sencilla" and new single "Pues Va A Ser Que No" from her second album Número 2. Isabel also presented the prize to the winner of the competition.

R/O	Country	Artist	Song	Points	Place
1	Greece	Alexandros and Kalli	"Tora einai i seira mas"	88	6
2	Denmark	Nicolai	"Shake Shake Shake"	121	4
3	Croatia	Lorena Jelusić	"Rock Baby"	36	12
4	Romania	Alina Eremia	"Țurai!"	89	5
5	United Kingdom	Joni Fuller	"How Does It Feel?"	28	14
6	Sweden	M+	"Gränslös kärlek"	22	15
7	Russia	Vladislav Krutskikh	"Doroga k solntsu"	66	9
8	Macedonia	Denis Dimoski	"Rodendeski baknež"	68	8
9	Netherlands	Tess	"Stupid"	82	7
10	Serbia and Montenegro	Filip Vučić	"Ljubav pa fudbal"	29	13
11	Latvia	Kids4Rock	"Es esmu maza jauka meitene"	50	11
12	Belgium	Lindsay	"Mes rêves"	63	10
13	Malta	Thea and Friends	"Make It Right!"	18	16
14	Norway	Malin	"Sommer og skolefri"	123	3
15	Spain	Antonio José	"Te traigo flores"	146	2
16	Belarus	Ksenia Sitnik	"My vmeste"	149	1

=== Spokespersons ===
1. Cyprus – Stella Maria Koukkidi
2. Greece – Yiorgos Kotsougiannis
3. Denmark – Caroline Forsberg Thybo
4. Croatia – Nika Turković
5. Romania – Beatrice Soare
6. United Kingdom – Vicky Gordon
7. Sweden – Halahen Zajden
8. Russia – Roman Kerimov
9. Macedonia – Vase Dokovski
10. Netherlands – Giovanni Kemper
11. Serbia and Montenegro – Jovana Vukčević
12. Latvia – Kristiana Stirane
13. Belgium – Max Colombie
14. Malta – Stephanie Bason
15. Norway – Karoline Wendelborg
16. Spain – Gonzalo Gutierrez Blanco
17. Belarus – Anton Lediaev

== Detailed voting results ==
Despite withdrawing at a late stage, Cyprus was still permitted to vote in the contest.

When the United Kingdom's spokesperson, Vicky Gordon, was about to give the country's televoting results, the scoreboard froze with all the scores compressed together, after which the screen went black with only the EBU, VRT and RTBF logos showing, which meant that the computers had lost connection with the British broadcaster ITV, although Gordon could still be heard. However, proceedings returned to normal shortly afterwards.

Detailed voting results
		Total score	Cyprus	Greece	Denmark	Croatia	Romania	United Kingdom	Sweden	Russia	Macedonia	Netherlands	Serbia and Montenegro	Latvia	Belgium	Malta	Norway	Spain	Belarus
Contestants	Greece	88	12		7	12	6	6	5	7	3	6	4		6			2	
Contestants	Denmark	121	6	7		8	3	1	10	6	12	7	5	6	8	7	12	7	4
Contestants	Croatia	36			2				3		8	2	6				3		
Contestants	Romania	89	10	10		2		3	4	3	4	5	7	3	4		7	12	3
Contestants	United Kingdom	28			3					1		1		2	2	5			2
Contestants	Sweden	22			8												2		
Contestants	Russia	66	3	5	1		4	2			1		1	10	3	1	5	6	12
Contestants	Macedonia	68				4	8	4	1	10		3	10	4	1	2		1	8
Contestants	Netherlands	82	2	4	10		2	7	7	4				1	12	8	4	4	5
Contestants	Serbia and Montenegro	29	1			6					10								
Contestants	Latvia	50		3		5	1	5	2	5	2		2			3	1	3	6
Contestants	Belgium	63	4	2		1	7					12		7		4	8	5	1
Contestants	Malta	18		1	5														
Contestants	Norway	123	5	6	12	3	5	8	12	2	5	10	3	8	7	10		8	7
Contestants	Spain	146	8	12	4	7	12	12	8	8	6	8	12	5	10	6	6		10
Contestants	Belarus	149	7	8	6	10	10	10	6	12	7	4	8	12	5	12	10	10	

=== 12 points ===
Below is a summary of all 12 points received. All countries were given 12 points at the start of voting to ensure that no country finished with nul points.

N.	Contestant	Nation(s) giving 12 points
4	Spain	Greece, Romania, Serbia and Montenegro, United Kingdom
3	Belarus	Malta, Latvia, Russia
2	Denmark	Macedonia, Norway
2	Greece	Croatia, Cyprus
2	Norway	Denmark, Sweden
1	Belgium	Netherlands
1	Netherlands	Belgium
1	Romania	Spain
1	Russia	Belarus

== Other countries ==
For a country to be eligible for potential participation in the Junior Eurovision Song Contest, it needs to be an active member of the EBU. The following active EBU members did not take part:

- Cyprus – Cyprus was originally going to participate in the 2005 contest, represented by Rena Kiriakidi's "Tsirko". However, it was later claimed to be plagiarised, and Cyprus Broadcasting Corporation (CyBC), the national broadcaster, was forced to withdraw. However, they still broadcast the show live and retained their voting rights. They returned the following year.
- France – France, one of two debutants at the previous contest, and broadcaster France 3 turned down the offer to participate due to the following reasons:
  - Programming difficulties and restructuring within the channel
  - Very low viewing figures the previous year
  - No motivation to compete, with the country's then-Head of Delegation Bruno Berberes stating that "Too much Eurovision kills Eurovision".

France would not return to the contest until 2018.

- Georgia – Georgia was one of the countries on the preliminary participation list for the 2005 contest. However, at the time, Georgian Public Broadcasting (GPB) was not a full member of the EBU and would only become a member on the 6 July 2005, but as this was one week after the participation confirmation deadline, Georgia could not participate and had to wait until 2007.
- Ireland – Just like in the 2004 contest, Raidió Teilifís Éireann (RTÉ) was said to be debuting at the 2005 contest. However, no official statement was released by the broadcaster and they ended up not participating. They would debut in 2015.
- Lithuania – Lithuania, like Georgia, was one of the countries on the preliminary list for 2005. However, the country withdrew for unspecified reasons. They would debut in 2007.
- Monaco – Monaco and Monegasque broadcaster TMC expressed an interest in participating. However, plans never came to fruition due to scheduling problems and harsh citizenship laws and thus they did not participate.
- Poland – Despite signing a 3-year contract with the EBU, Polish broadcaster Telewizja Polska (TVP) announced they would withdraw due to lack of interest and poor results. They would not return until 2016.
- Portugal – Even though Portugal did not participate, public broadcaster Rádio e Televisão de Portugal (RTP) broadcast the contest delayed and confirmed they would debut in 2006.
- Switzerland – Switzerland, one of two debutants in 2004, and the Swiss-Italian broadcaster RTSI turned down the offer to participate for the following reasons:
  - Financial difficulties
  - Lack of interest and financial support from the other multilingual broadcasters of Swiss Broadcasting Corporation (SRG SSR)
- Ukraine – Ukraine, like Lithuania, was on the preliminary list of participants for 2005. But, they pulled out at the last minute and had to wait until the next year to debut.

== Broadcasts ==
Broadcasters and commentators in participating countries
Country	Broadcaster(s)	Channel(s)	Commentator(s)	Ref.
Belarus	BTRC	Belarus 1, Belarus 24	Denis Kurian	
Belgium	VRT	Eén	Dutch: Ilse Van Hoecke and André Vermeulen	
Belgium	RTBF	La Une, RTBF Sat	French: Jean-Louis Lahaye	
Croatia	HRT	HRT 1	Unknown	
Denmark	DR	DR1	Nicolai Molbech	
Greece	ERT	ET1, ERT Sat	Unknown	
Latvia	LTV	LTV1	Kārlis Streips and Valters Frīdenbergs	
Macedonia	MRT	MTV 1	Milanka Rašik	
Malta	PBS	TVM	Valerie Vella	
Netherlands	AVRO	Nederland 1	Tooske Ragas	
Norway	NRK	NRK1	Nadia Hasnaoui	
Romania	TVR	TVR1, TVRi	Ioana Isopecu and Alexandru Nagy	
Russia	RTR	Russia TV, RTR-Planeta	Yuri Nikolaev	
Serbia and Montenegro	UJRT	RTS 2	Serbian: Duška Vučinić-Lučić	
Spain	TVE	TVE1, TVE Internacional	Beatriz Pécker and Lucho	
Sweden	SVT	SVT1	Josefine Sundström	
United Kingdom	ITV	ITV2, ITV1 (Note: Delayed broadcast in a shortened format on 27 November at 14:25 UTC)	Michael Underwood	

Broadcasters and commentators in non-participating countries
Country	Broadcaster(s)	Channel(s)	Commentator(s)	Ref.
Albania	RTSH	TVSH	Unknown	
Australia	SBS	SBS One	No commentary	
Cyprus	CyBC	RIK 1	Unknown	
Israel	IBA (Note: Delayed broadcast on 7 December 2007)	C1	No commentary	
Portugal	RTP	RTP1 (Note: Delayed broadcast on 10 December 2005)	Eládio Clímaco	
Ukraine	NTU	Pershyi	Timur Miroshnychenko	

== See also ==
- Eurovision Song Contest 2005
- Eurovision Young Dancers 2005
