= Nicolai Kielstrup =

Danish singer (born 1991)

Nicolai Kielstrup (born 4 October 1991) is a Danish singer who participated in the Junior Eurovision Song Contest 2005.

Kielstrup was born in Vejle, Jutland. In 2003, he was present at the Junior Eurovision Song Contest in Copenhagen, as he knew one of the participants.

In 2004, he wrote "Shake, Shake, Shake", a rap song about a nervous boy who falls in love after meeting a girl on the bus on a school field trip to a pond. He performed it at the MGP Junior 2005 scoring maximum points. His resulting participation in Junior Eurovision Song Contest 2005 earned him a fourth-place finish.

== Personal life ==
Nicolai has a little sister, Natalie, who competed in MGP, but she didn't advance to Melodi Grand Prix Nordic.

== Discography ==
=== Albums ===
He has released two albums, 'Nicolai' (2006) and 'Stage 2' (2007)

His third album 'Deja Vu - Tilbage til Mig' was released on 2 February 2009.

Year	Information	Denmark	Sales and Certifications
2006	Nicolai: First studio album; Released: November 2006; Label: Universal; Format: CD	9	^{Danish sales: 30,000; IFPI: Platinum}
2007	Stage 2: Second studio album; Released: 12 November 2007; Label: My Way Music; Format: CD	19	^{Danish sales: 25,000; IFPI: Gold}
2009	Dejavu - Tilbage til mig: Third Studio album; Released: 2 February 2009; Label: DiGiDi; Format: CD		

Awards and achievements
Preceded by Cool Kids with "Pigen er min"	Denmark in the Junior Eurovision Song Contest; 2005	Succeeded by -
