= Maria Spiridaki =

Greek model (born 1984)

Maria Spyridaki
- Born: Maria Spyridaki; January 2, 1984 (age 41); Heraklion, Crete, Greece
- Height: 1.82 m (6 ft 0 in)

Maria Spyridaki (Greek: Μαρία Σπυριδάκη) is a Greek actress, tv host, model and beauty pageant titleholder. In 2004 she won the title Miss Hellas (Greek: Μις Ελλάς) at the Miss Star Hellas pageant and went on to represent Greece at the Miss World pageant.

== News ==
In 2004, Maria co-hosted the Greek junior selection for the Junior Eurovision Song Contest 2005 which was held in Belgium.
