= Sweden in the Junior Eurovision Song Contest 2005 =

- Junior Eurovision Song Contest 2005
- Country: Sweden
- Selection process: Lilla Melodifestivalen 2005
- Selection date: 7 October 2005

Competing entry
- Song: "Gränslös kärlek"
- Artist: M+

Placement
- Final result: 15th, 22 points

Participation chronology

Sweden was represented at the Junior Eurovision Song Contest 2005 in Hasselt, Belgium by M+ with "Gränslös kärlek". The duo of Maria Chabo and Maria Josefson were the winner of Lilla Melodifestivalen 2005, used to select the Swedish entry for the contest.

== Before Junior Eurovision ==
=== Lilla Melodifestivalen 2005 ===
Organised by Swedish broadcaster Sveriges Television (SVT), Lilla Melodifestivalen 2005 was the national selection used to select the Swedish entry to the Junior Eurovision Song Contest 2005. After much deliberation by SVT on what date to host the show, it was finally decided to host it on 7 October 2005.

The show was hosted by singer Nanne Grönvall and comedian Shan Atci. The votes of five regional juries and televoting selected the winner from the ten competing songs selected from the 1400 songs submitted to SVT to compete.

Draw	Artist	Song	Jury	Televote	Total	Place
1	LaLi	"Du får ta mitt hjärta"	28	10	38	7
2	Ana	"Dansa är OK"	16	60	76	2
3	Alex and Wiliam	"Vill du bli min tjej?"	12	10	22	9
4	Julia	"Jag vill inte förklara"	46	30	76	3
5	My	"Mamma förlåt"	20	20	40	5
6	Lu.Ke	"Hela världen snurrar"	24	40	64	4
7	Nathalie	"Utan dig"	28	10	38	7
8	Ida and Jessie	"Coola brudar"	16	10	26	8
9	Ludde	"Håkan kråkan"	12	10	22	9
10	M+	"Gränslös kärlek"	48	50	98	1

== At Junior Eurovision ==
On the night of the contest, held in Hasselt in Belgium, M+ performed 6th in the running order of the contest, following United Kingdom and preceding Russia. At the close of the voting "Gränslös kärlek" received 22 points, placing 15th of the 16 competing entries.

=== Voting ===
Points awarded to Sweden
Score	Country
12 points (Note: All countries received one set of 12 points to ensure no country finished with nul points.)	
10 points	
8 points	Denmark
7 points	
6 points	
5 points	
4 points	
3 points	
2 points	Norway
1 point	

Points awarded by Sweden
Score	Country
12 points	Norway
10 points	Denmark
8 points	Spain
7 points	Netherlands
6 points	Belarus
5 points	Greece
4 points	Romania
3 points	Croatia
2 points	Latvia
1 point	Macedonia
