= Tess Gaerthé =

- Also known as: Tess
- Born: Tess Gaerthé; 21 August 1991 (age 35); Amsterdam, Netherlands
- Origin: Putte, Belgium
- Genres: Pop, Jazz
- Occupation: Singer
- Instrument: Vocals
- Years active: 2005–present

Tess Gaerthé (born 21 August 1991), better known as simply Tess, is a Dutch singer and former child star. Gaerthé rose to fame as the Dutch representative at the third Junior Eurovision Song Contest in 2005. Singing "Stupid", she finished in 7th place with 82 points, which remained the best result for the country until 2009.

== Life and career ==
Tess was born in the VU Amsterdam Hospital on 21 August 1991, half an hour after her twin brother Joël. They enjoyed a musical and intercultural upbringing due to their numerous international au-pairs. In 2001, Gaerthé and her family relocate to Belgium after her mother opened an office in Brussels.

In 2005, Gaerthé, auditioned for the Dutch preselection of the Junior Eurovision Song Contest with a song she co-wrote with her mother, "Stupid". Eventually, she was appointed as the Dutch representative for the contest in Hasselt, Belgium. At the time she participated in the contest, Gaerthé lived in Putte, Antwerp. At the end of the voting, Tess finished in seventh position, the country's best performance in the contest at that time.

After the contest, she released several additional singles, including the theme song for the children's television series Spetter, "Mijn allerbeste vriend". Together with Thomas Berge, Gaerthé sang the Dutch version of the main duet of High School Musical 2, by Disney. Gaerthé's first album, Onweerstaanbaar was released on 6 March 2008 in Belgium and the Netherlands and was the final step of a her earlier singing career, as she had no desire to continue to stay a child star.

As of 2018, Gaerthé works as a music licenser at the label Cloud 9 Music. In 2018, she studied International Music Management.

In 2020, Gaerthé performed "Stupid" live on NPO 3FM, marking the fifteenth anniversary of her song.

== Discography ==
=== Albums ===
- 2008: Onweerstaanbaar

=== Singles ===
- 2005: "Stupid"
- 2006: "First Kiss"
- 2006: "Mijn allerbeste vriend"
- 2007: "De stem van mijn hart" (featuring Thomas Berge)
- 2008: "Little Pink Thing"
- 2008: "Change"

Awards and achievements
Preceded by Klaartje en Nicky	Netherlands in the Junior Eurovision Song Contest; 2005	Succeeded by Kimberly Nieuwenhuis
