= Joni Fuller =

English musician (born 1991)

- Born: Joni Amelia Fuller; 1991 (age 34–35); Lancashire, England
- Occupations: Singer; musician; songwriter
- Instruments: Vocals; keyboards; violin
- Years active: 2004–present
- Website: www.jonifuller.com

Joni Amelia Fuller is an English singer/songwriter, pianist, violinist and composer from Lancashire. She is the founder of Your Strings Attached.

Her debut album, Voices, recorded in October 2006, contained 12 of her original songs.

Fuller scored two successive wins in the UK's national Make it Break it Songwriting Contest (2008 and 2009) with her songs "America" and "Change Girl".

== Early years ==
Fuller persuaded her parents to buy her a violin for her 5th birthday. Aged 8, she was accepted into the Junior School at the Royal Northern College of Music (first study violin; second study piano) where she achieved ABRSM Grade 8 in both instruments. Fuller began writing her own songs when she was 8 years old.

Fuller performed extensively, developing a trade-mark high energy, instrument swapping performance style that showcased her abilities as a songwriter, singer, pianist, violinist, bassist and guitarist. Aged 12, she performed solo at the Casino Barriere during the Montreux Jazz Festival. Other venues included: Théâtre de Vaudeville (Brussels), Madinat Jumeirah (Dubai) and the Lido Theatre (Paris). Fuller opened two nights during Phil Collins' 'First Final Farewell Tour' at the LTU Arena in Düsseldorf. Aged 14, Fuller was the UK's entrant to the Junior Eurovision Song Contest in 2005 with her song 'How Does it Feel?'.

== 2007–2015 ==
In 2007, Fuller was awarded 'Le Prix du Merite Artistique' at the LDF awards ceremony in Lausanne and the 'Besso Memorial Prize for Pianoforte' by the Associated Board of the Royal Schools of Music. She performed at the Olympic Stadium in Lausanne during Athletissima 2007. She also performed at the World Conference on Giftedness.

In 2008, Fuller concentrated on live performances in the UK. She received a standing ovation at the Montrose Music Festival and in August, was chosen by the Performing Rights Society to front a media campaign to highlight the importance of performance royalties in supporting young songwriters.

In October 2008, Fuller's song "America" was chosen by a panel of judges that included Chris Martin (Coldplay) as a winner in the Make it Break it Songwriting Contest. In 2009, Fuller scored a second win in the annual MIBI Songwriting Contest with "Change Girl". Later that year, Fuller was featured in The Independent newspaper as an "inspirational teenager".

In 2010, Fuller was awarded "Best Female Artist" at the Exposure Music Awards and featured as "one to watch" by PRS for Music in their on-line magazine M.

2011 and 2012 saw Fuller continue to develop her live shows with performances in London (Ronnie Scott's, The Bedford, The Elgin) and a return to Athletissima in Lausanne, alongside headline performances at Mo-Fest and the Arundel Festival.

During 2014, Fuller launched a new solo acoustic live show, using a loop pedal and swapping instruments live on stage. Fuller recorded a four track EP, 'Letters From The West Coast' in Spring 2015 and embarked on a busy schedule of live shows. In May 2015, Fuller was the only solo artist to reach Indie Week Europe's Final Showcase at The Ruby Lounge, Manchester.

== 2015 onwards ==
In 2015, Fuller launched Your Strings Attached, an online session music service. Her arrangements and performances have been used in film, TV and album releases. In 2017, she composed the full score for indie horror film The Black Gloves, and became a composer and sample developer for California-based Outlier Studios.

She has arranged and recorded strings for film, TV and game projects including: Call of Duty: Modern Warfare III, Prince William: A Planet for Us All, Prince Philip: The Royal Family Remembers, Rooney, Hard Kill.

She composed music for Attenborough and the Giant Sea Monster (BBC One, 2024) and Agatha Christie: Lucy Worsley on the Mystery Queen (BBC2, 2022) and three episodes of Religion of Sports' Greatness Code (Apple TV, 2022).

Her music has been featured in trailers including Saltburn, Tár, The Great, Death on the Nile, Capone, Birdbox, Blow The Man Down and Glass Onion: A Knives Out Mystery.

== Recordings ==
Fuller wrote all 12 songs for her debut album, Voices.

=== Track list ===
1. Voices
2. I Take a Step Away
3. Sail Away
4. How Does it Feel?
5. Over in a Minute
6. So Much to Say
7. Fairy Tales
8. Finding My Way
9. I Guess That's How it Goes
10. Little Child
11. Search Beyond the Moon
12. After the Tide

Fuller also wrote all the songs on her 2009 EP Run for Cover.

1. Wait until the Morning Comes
2. Run for Cover
3. America
4. Face Down
5. Change Girl
6. Paper Cuts

Fuller wrote, performed and produced Letters From The West Coast in 2015.

1. The Penny
2. Wild Wild West
3. Real Love
4. Letter To Myself

Awards and achievements
Preceded by Cory Spedding with "The Best Is Yet to Come"	United Kingdom in the Junior Eurovision Song Contest; 2005	Succeeded by Freya Skye with "Lose My Head"
