= Yuri Nikolaev =

Soviet and Russian actor (1948–2025)

Yuri Nikolaev PAR
- Юрий Николаев
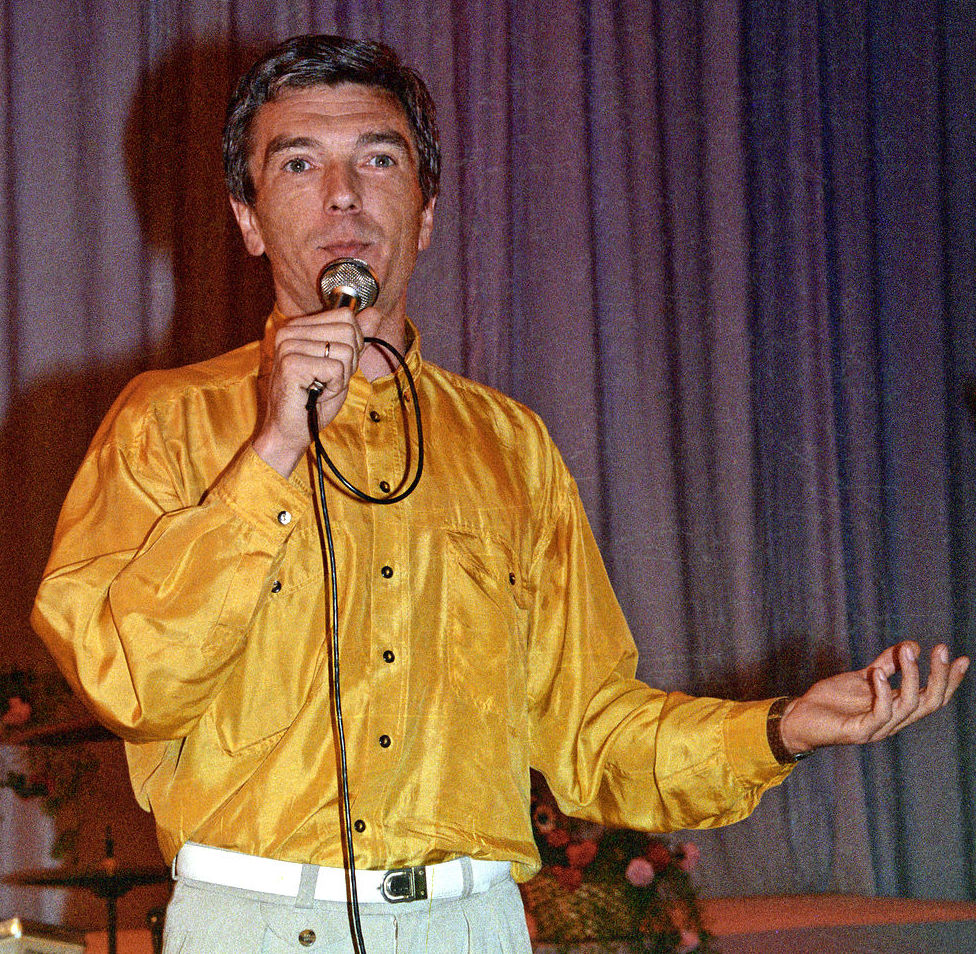
- Nikolaev in 1991
- Born: Yuri Alexandrovich Nikolaev; 16 December 1948; Chișinău, Moldavian SSR, USSR
- Died: 4 November 2025 (aged 76); Moscow, Russia
- Occupations: Television host and producer, radio host, actor
- Years active: 1970–2025
- Spouse: Eleonora Nikolaeva (born 1952)

Yuri Alexandrovich Nikolaev (Russian: Юрий Александрович Николаев; 16 December 1948 – 4 November 2025) was a Soviet and Russian television and radio host and actor. He was awarded the title of People's Artist of Russia in 1998, and since 2007 was a member of the Academy of Russian Television. On 9 May 2007, he was awarded the Order of Friendship via presidential decree, and was awarded the Order of Honour on 14 January 2014 "for his great contribution in the development of national television, radio, print and many years of fruitful activity."

Nikolaev supported the Russian anti-LGBT propaganda law, which prohibits the "propaganda of non-traditional sexual relationships". He also spoke out in support of Russia's invasion of Ukraine.

Nikolaev died in Moscow on 4 November 2025, at the age of 76, from a combination of bowel cancer, lung cancer and pneumonia.
