= Latvia in the Junior Eurovision Song Contest =

- Junior Eurovision Song Contest
- Participating broadcaster: Latvijas Televīzija (LTV)

Participation summary
- Appearances: 5
- First appearance: 2003
- Last appearance: 2011
- Highest placement: 9th: 2003
- Participation history: 2003; 2004; 2005; 2006 – 2009; 2010; 2011; 2012 – 2025
- For the most recent participation see Latvia in the Junior Eurovision Song Contest 2011

Latvia has been represented at the Junior Eurovision Song Contest since the inaugural contest in 2003. The Latvian participating broadcaster in the contest is Latvijas Televīzija (LTV). The broadcaster used a national selection format, entitled "Bērnu Eirovīzija" and later "Balss Pavēlnieks", for its participation at the contests. The first entry at the 2003 contest was "Tu esi vasarā" by Dzintars Čīča, which finished in ninth place out of sixteen participating entries, achieving a score of thirty-seven points. LTV were originally absent from the competition from 2006 to 2009. It briefly returned in 2010 and 2011 however again withdrew from competing after the contest held in Yerevan, and have yet to make its return to the contest.

== History ==
Latvia are one of the sixteen countries to have made their debut at the inaugural Junior Eurovision Song Contest 2003, which took place on 15 November 2003 at the Forum in Copenhagen, Denmark. Latvia's best placing was in 2003, when Dzintars Čīča placed 9th with "Tu esi vasarā". The country's worst placing came in 2004 when Mārtiņš Tālbergs and C-Stones Juniors placed 17th and last with "Balts vai melns". Although the Latvian broadcaster opened a submission window for their national final ahead of the 2006 contest, they later decided to withdraw from the contest and would not return until the 2010 contest, their first participation in five years.

The broadcaster selected Šarlote Lēnmane to represent Latvia at the Junior Eurovision Song Contest 2010 in Minsk with the song "Viva La Dance". Šarlote won 10th place with 51 points.

After initially withdrawing from the 2011 contest, LTV reversed their decision in September 2011 and sent an entry to the 2011 contest in Yerevan, Armenia. On 27 June 2012, LTV announced Latvia's withdrawal from the competition, and the country has never returned since. LTV later confirmed their non-participation in 2013, 2014 and 2015.

On 19 November 2015, it was announced that the Baltic countries, including Latvia, were interested in taking part in the 2016 contest. However, on 23 May 2016, the LTV confirmed it would not return to the contest in 2016.

== Participation overview ==
Table key
◁	Last place

Year	Artist	Song	Language	Place	Points
2003	Dzintars Čīča	"Tu esi vasarā"	Latvian	9	37
2004	Mārtiņš Tālbergs and C-Stones Juniors	"Balts vai melns"	Latvian	17 ◁	3
2005	Kids4Rock	"Es esmu maza, jauka meitene"	Latvian	11	50
2010	Šarlote and the Sea Stones	"Viva la Dance (Dejo tā)"	Latvian	10	51
2011	Amanda Bašmakova	"Moondog"	Latvian	13 ◁	31

== Commentators and spokespersons ==
The contests are broadcast online worldwide through the official Junior Eurovision Song Contest website junioreurovision.tv and YouTube. In 2015, the online broadcasts featured commentary in English by junioreurovision.tv editor Luke Fisher and 2011 Bulgarian Junior Eurovision Song Contest entrant Ivan Ivanov. The Latvian broadcaster, LTV, sent their own commentators to the contest in order to provide commentary in the Latvian language. Spokespersons were also chosen by the national broadcaster in order to announce the awarding points from Latvia. The table below list the details of each commentator and spokesperson since 2003.

Year(s)	Channel	Commentator	Spokesperson
2003	LTV1	Kārlis Streips	Dāvids Dauriņš
2004	LTV1	Kārlis Streips	Sabīne Berezina
2005	LTV1	Kārlis Streips and Valters Frīdenbergs	Kristiāna Stirāne
2006–2009	No broadcast		Did not participate
2010	LTV1	Valters Frīdenbergs	Ralfs Eilands
2011	LTV7	Markus Riva	Šarlote Lēnmane
2012–2026	No broadcast		Did not participate

== See also ==
- Latvia in the Eurovision Song Contest – Senior version of the Junior Eurovision Song Contest.
