= Trixxo Arena =

Indoor arena in Hasselt, Belgium

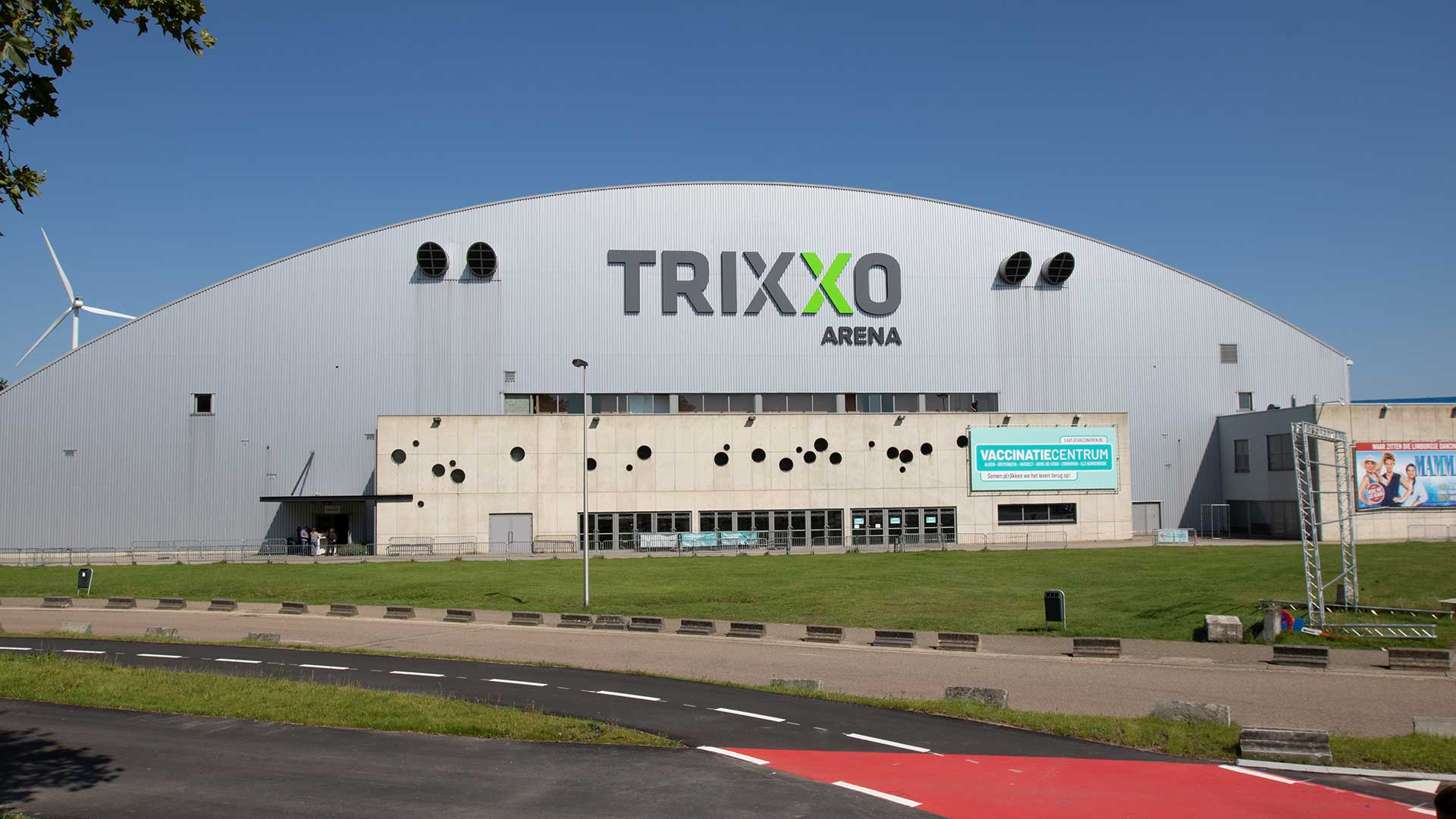
- Interactive map of Trixxo Arena
- Former names: Ethias Arena (2004–2021)
- Location: Gouverneur Verwilghensingel 70, 3500 Hasselt, Limburg, Belgium
- Coordinates: 50.93431°N 5.36322°E
- Owner: Antwerp Sportpaleis NV
- Operator: Antwerp Sportpaleis NV
- Capacity: 9,946 (Main Hall: seated); 18,600 (Main Hall: standing)

Construction
- Groundbreaking: 15 March 2004
- Built: March–September 2004
- Opened: 21 September 2004
- Renovated: 2012
- Cost: €11.7 million
- Architect: Jamaer Architecten
- Structural engineer: BTA engineers
- Main contractor: Cosimco (Kontich)

Tenant
- Gaz de France Stars (Tennis) (2004–2006)

The Trixxo Arena is the largest multipurpose arena in Hasselt, Limburg, Belgium used for music concerts, sports (tennis, indoor cycling, jumping, etc.) and other large events. It opened in September 2004 at a total construction cost of €11.7 million. The arena complex can hold up to around 21,000 people, with the Main Hall holding a maximum of 18,000.

The Trixxo Arena is a part of Park H and the complex has a surface of 25,000 square metres (270,000 sq ft), with the Main Hall covering 13,600 square metres (146,000 sq ft). At the end of 2005, "Plopsa Indoor Hasselt", an indoor attraction park for children, opened next to the arena and is unique in Belgium.

Until 25 August 2021, the Trixxo Arena was known as the Ethias Arena.

== Events ==
On May 22, 2005, Destiny's Child performed for the first time in the city as part of their world tour 'Destiny Fulfilled... and Lovin' It'.

On 26 November 2005, the 3rd Junior Eurovision Song Contest took place in the Ethias Arena.

In 2015, 2016, 2017 and 2020 it hosted the European Championship in darts, a Professional Darts Corporation event.

== See also ==
- List of indoor arenas in Belgium
