= Denmark in the Junior Eurovision Song Contest =

- Junior Eurovision Song Contest
- Participating broadcaster: Danish Broadcasting Corporation (DR)

Participation summary
- Appearances: 3
- First appearance: 2003
- Last appearance: 2005
- Highest placement: 4th: 2005
- Host: 2003
- Participation history: 2003; 2004; 2005; 2006 – 2026

Related articles
- MGP Junior
- For the most recent participation see Denmark in the Junior Eurovision Song Contest 2005

Denmark has been represented at the Junior Eurovision Song Contest three times. The Danish participating broadcaster in the contest is the Danish Broadcasting Corporation (DR). It hosted the first Junior Eurovision Song Contest in 2003, having developed the contest's predecessor MGP Nordic. DR withdrew from the competition after 2005.

== History ==
In spring 2000, Danmarks Radio launched a song contest for aspiring singers aged 8 to 15, for which the format proved to be a success and caught the attention of Norway and Sweden two years later, making a pre-Scandinavian song contest known as MGP Nordic, first held in 2002. The European Broadcasting Union (EBU) later picked up on the idea of said format and created a pan-European version, known as the Junior Eurovision Song Contest.

Having come in the top five in the first three contests, DR decided not to participate in the contest from 2006 onwards to continue with MGP Nordic alongside Sweden's SVT and Norway's NRK. In 2007, DR revealed that they had no intention to return to the contest, choosing to stick with the MGP Nordic competition. The EBU had previously been negotiating with commercial broadcasters to replace the absent Nordic broadcasters at Junior Eurovision. TV 2 has however ruled out Junior Eurovision participation.

Shortly before the 2015 edition, DR announced that they would "no longer" participate in further editions of the Junior Eurovision Song Contest. Jan Lagermand Lundme, the Entertainment President of DR, stated that the reason behind this decision was because the competition had become too much of a copy of the main Eurovision Song Contest and that the contest had strayed from its core idea—"the joy, the humor and the play". On 17 February 2018, it was reported that the EBU is calling on the Danish broadcaster to return to Junior Eurovision after a 12-year break. In response to this, Lundme played down the likelihood of Denmark returning to the competition, saying "Now, never say never, but as long as the show is, as it is now, I’m definitely not going to compete again. The values that we put in Denmark in a program for children do not match the values of the Junior Eurovision Song Contest… It seems that the children are on stage and play adults instead of acting as children, and we think that is fundamentally wrong. Children must be children, they should not try to strive to be something they are not. It’s super bad for us, because we really wanted to be part of the show. Participating in a concept like Junior Eurovision would be a natural step for us after MGP, but it does not work when we do not feel the show fits the Danish values." In December 2022 Marlene Boel, Head of Children's Television at DR, stated that Junior Eurovision is "neither a priority for us or something we are interested in participating in" but has "developed over the years" and also addressed some of the criticism that DR had regarding the show when the broadcaster withdrew in 2006.

In October 2023, the EBU launched a child safety and protection protocol that aims to remove pressure on the participants, in hopes of bringing back the Nordic countries in 2024 and beyond.

== Participation overview ==
Year	Artist	Song	Language	Place	Points
2003	Anne Gadegaard	"Arabiens drøm"	Danish	5	93
2004	Cool Kids	"Pigen er min"	Danish	5	116
2005	Nicolai Kielstrup	"Shake Shake Shake"	Danish, English	4	121

== Commentators and spokespersons ==
The contests are broadcast online worldwide through the official Junior Eurovision Song Contest website junioreurovision.tv and YouTube. In 2015, the online broadcasts featured commentary in English by junioreurovision.tv editor Luke Fisher and 2011 Bulgarian Junior Eurovision Song Contest entrant Ivan Ivanov. The Danish broadcaster, DR, sent their own commentators to each contest in order to provide commentary in the Danish language. Spokespersons were also chosen by the national broadcaster in order to announce the awarding points from Denmark. The table below list the details of each commentator and spokesperson since 2003.

Year(s)	Commentator	Spokesperson
2003	Nicolai Molbech	Unknown
2004	Nicolai Molbech	Anne Gadegaard
2005	Nicolai Molbech	Caroline Forsberg Thybo
2006–2026	No broadcast	Did not participate

== Hostings ==
Year	Location	Venue	Presenters
2003	Copenhagen	Forum Copenhagen	Camilla Ottesen and Remee

== See also ==
- Denmark in the Eurovision Song Contest – Senior version of the Junior Eurovision Song Contest.
