= Spain in the Junior Eurovision Song Contest =

- Junior Eurovision Song Contest
- Participating broadcaster: Radiotelevisión Española (RTVE; 2019–present) Formerly: Televisión Española (TVE; 2003–2006)

Participation summary
- Appearances: 12
- First appearance: 2003
- Highest placement: 1st: 2004
- Host: 2024
- Participation history: 2003; 2004; 2005; 2006; 2007 – 2018; 2019; 2020; 2021; 2022; 2023; 2024; 2025; 2026
- For the most recent participation see Spain in the Junior Eurovision Song Contest 2026

Spain has been represented at the Junior Eurovision Song Contest since the inaugural contest in 2003. The Spanish participating broadcaster in the contest is Radiotelevisión Española (RTVE) since 2019 (formerly Televisión Española between 2003 and 2006). The broadcaster used a national selection format, broadcasting a show entitled Eurojunior, for its participation at the contests. Its first entry at the 2003 contest "Desde el cielo" by Sergio, which finished in second place out of sixteen participating entries, achieving a score of 125 points. Spain did not participate from 2007 to 2018, but returned to the contest in 2019.

== History ==
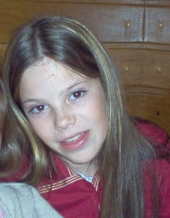
María Isabel who won for Spain at Junior Eurovision 2004.

Spain is one of the sixteen countries to have made their debut at the inaugural Junior Eurovision Song Contest 2003, which took place on 15 November 2003 at the Forum in Copenhagen, Denmark. Child singer Sergio was the first participant to represent Spain with the song "Desde el cielo", which finished in second place out of sixteen participating entries, achieving a score of 137 points. Spain is one of the most successful countries in the contest, with its first six entrants all finishing in the top 5. The country won in 2004, with "Antes muerta que sencilla" performed by María Isabel, as well as coming second place twice, in both 2003 and 2005. Spanish broadcaster Televisión Española (TVE) did not return after the 2006 contest, stating "the Junior Eurovision promotes stereotypes we do not share".

Since 2013, there were several attempts to manage the return of Spain to the contest. During the Eurovision Song Contest 2014 in Copenhagen, the head of the Spanish delegation, Federico Llano said that Radiotelevisión Española (RTVE) was not planning to participate in the 2014 contest. In 2014, it was stated that the European Broadcasting Union (EBU) television committee would discuss the possibility of allowing commercial television channels to participate, in order to negotiate with Spanish private broadcasters to manage the return of Spain to the contest. These attempts did not come to fruition. In 2015, several media outlets reported that RTVE was working on returning to the contest, but, these claims were not confirmed by the broadcaster.

On 13 May 2016, EBU Executive Supervisor Jon Ola Sand announced at a press conference that the EBU were in contact with broadcasters from several countries including Spain, so that they would participate in the 2016 contest. On 28 September 2016, however, Spain was not listed as one of the seventeen participating countries in the contest. RTVE returned to the contest in 2019 after a 13-year absence. Their return proved to be successful, with "Marte" by Melani García in 2019 and "Palante" by Soleá in 2020 both reaching third place. Their success, however, could not be repeated with "Reír" by Levi Díaz, who placed 15th, the first and only time Spain has placed outside the top 10. In 2022, "Señorita" by Carlos Higes placed 6th, bringing Spain back to the top 10. In 2023, "Loviu" by Sandra Valero finished 2nd, giving Spain their best result since 2005.

On 14 February 2024, the EBU and RTVE announced that the latter would host the 2024 contest after previous winners France's France Télévisions opted against hosting. It was the first time that Spain hosted the contest. On 10 May 2024, the EBU and RTVE selected Madrid as the host city for the event.

== Participation overview ==
Table key
1	First place
2	Second place
3	Third place
†	Upcoming event

Year	Artist	Song	Language	Place	Points
2003	Sergio	"Desde el cielo"	Spanish	2	125
2004	María Isabel	"Antes muerta que sencilla"	Spanish	1	171
2005	Antonio José	"Te traigo flores"	Spanish	2	146
2006	Dani Fernández	"Te doy mi voz"	Spanish	4	90
2019	Melani García	"Marte"	Spanish	3	212
2020	Soleá	"Palante"	Spanish	3	133
2021	Levi Díaz	"Reír"	Spanish	15	77
2022	Carlos Higes	"Señorita"	Spanish, English	6	137
2023	Sandra Valero	"Loviu"	Spanish	2	201
2024	Chloe DelaRosa	"Como la Lola"	Spanish	6	144
2025	Gonzalo Pinillos	"Érase una vez (Once Upon a Time)"	Spanish, English	5	152
2026	Lucas Paulano	"Cuore Bello (Te quiero, Te quiero)"	Spanish	2	184
2027	Confirmed intention to participate †				

== Commentators and spokespersons ==
The contests are broadcast online worldwide through the official Junior Eurovision Song Contest website junioreurovision.tv and YouTube. In 2015, the online broadcasts featured commentary in English by junioreurovision.tv editor Luke Fisher and 2011 Bulgarian Junior Eurovision Song Contest entrant Ivan Ivanov. TVE sent their own commentators to the contest in order to provide commentary in the Spanish language. Spokespersons were also chosen by the broadcaster in order to announce the awarding points from Spain. The table below list the details of each commentator and spokesperson since 2003.

Year(s)	Channel	Television commentator	Radio commentator	Spokesperson	Ref.
2003	La 1	Fernando Argenta	No broadcast	Jimmy Castro	
2004	La 1	Fernando Argenta	No broadcast	Lucho	
2005	La 1	Beatriz Pécker and Lucho	No broadcast	Gonzalo Gutiérrez Blanco	
2006	La 1	Fernando Argenta and Lucho	No broadcast	Lucía	
2007–2018	No broadcast		No broadcast	Did not participate	N/A
2019	La 1, TVE Internacional	Tony Aguilar, Julia Varela, and Víctor Escudero	No broadcast	Violeta Leal	
2020	La 1, TVE Internacional	Tony Aguilar, Eva Mora, and Víctor Escudero	No broadcast	Melani García	
2021	La 1, TVE Internacional	Tony Aguilar and Julia Varela	No broadcast	Lucía Arcos	
2022	La 1, TVE Internacional	Tony Aguilar and Julia Varela	No broadcast	Juan Diego Álvarez	
2023	La 1, TVE Internacional	Tony Aguilar and Julia Varela	No broadcast	Juan Diego Álvarez	
2024	La 1, TVE Internacional	Spanish: Tony Aguilar and Julia Varela; Catalan: (Note: Catalan-language commentary option available only in Catalonia.) Sònia Urbano and Xavi Martínez	Spanish: David Asensio and Sara Calvo; Catalan: Sònia Urbano and Xavi Martínez	Carlos Higes	
2025	La 1, TVE Internacional	Tony Aguilar and Julia Varela	No broadcast	Chloe DelaRosa	
2026	La 1, TVE Internacional	Tony Aguilar and Julia Varela	No broadcast	Gonzalo Pinillos	

== Hostings ==
Year	Location	Venue	Presenters	Ref.
2024	Madrid	Caja Mágica	Ruth Lorenzo, Marc Clotet and Melani García	

=== Gallery ===
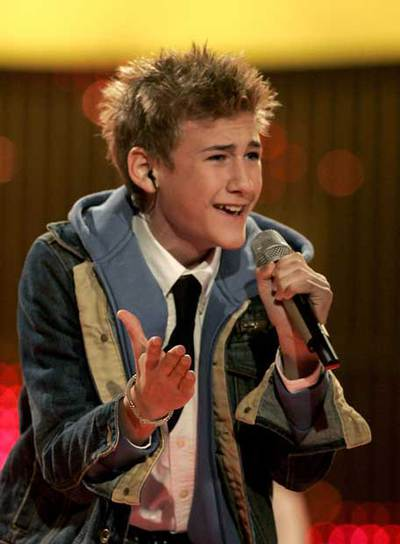
Dani Fernández in Bucharest (2006)

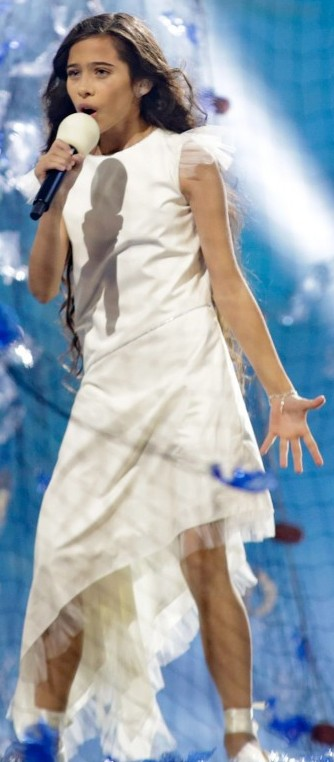
Melani García in Gliwice (2019)

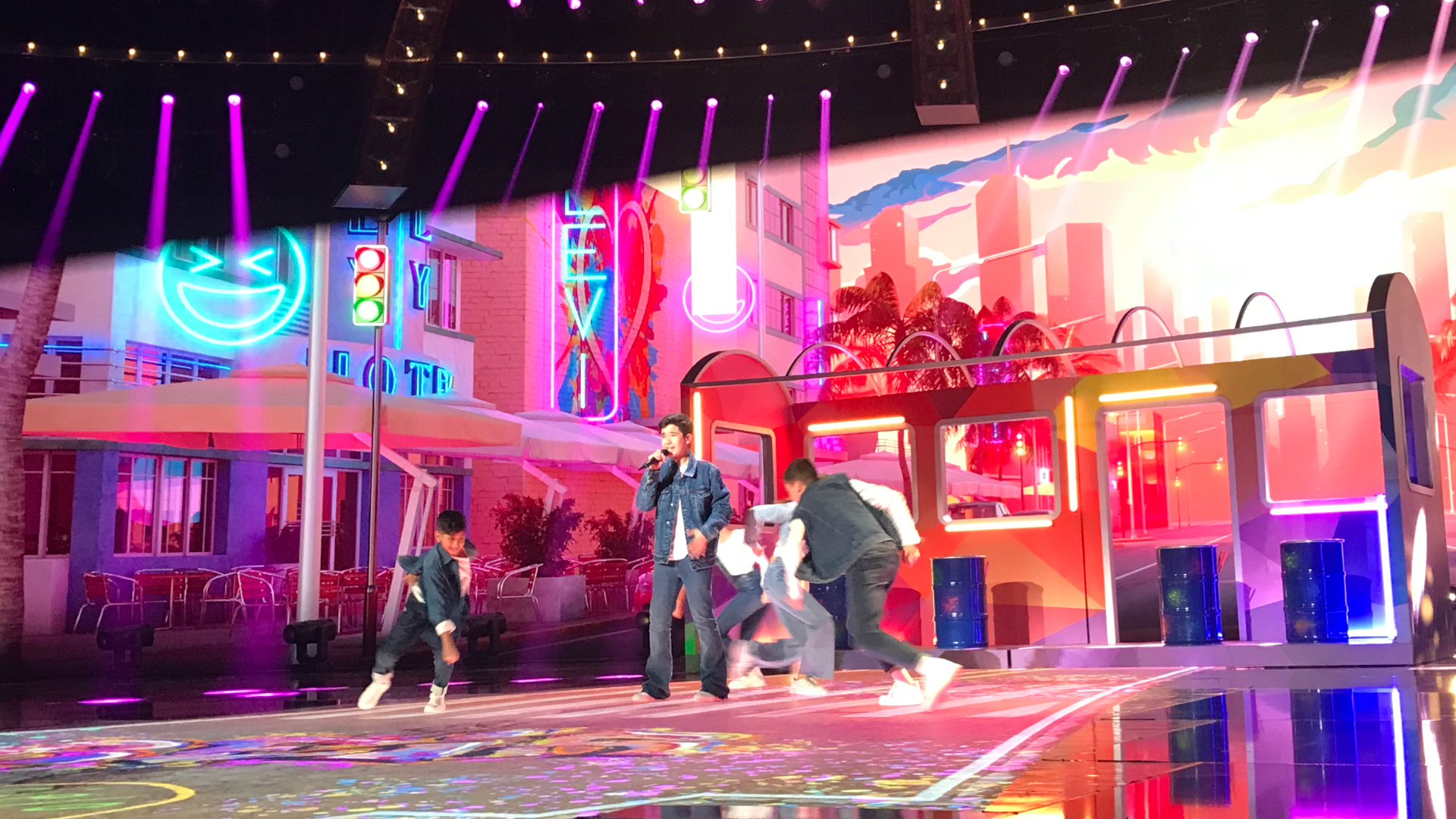
Levi Díaz in Paris (2021)

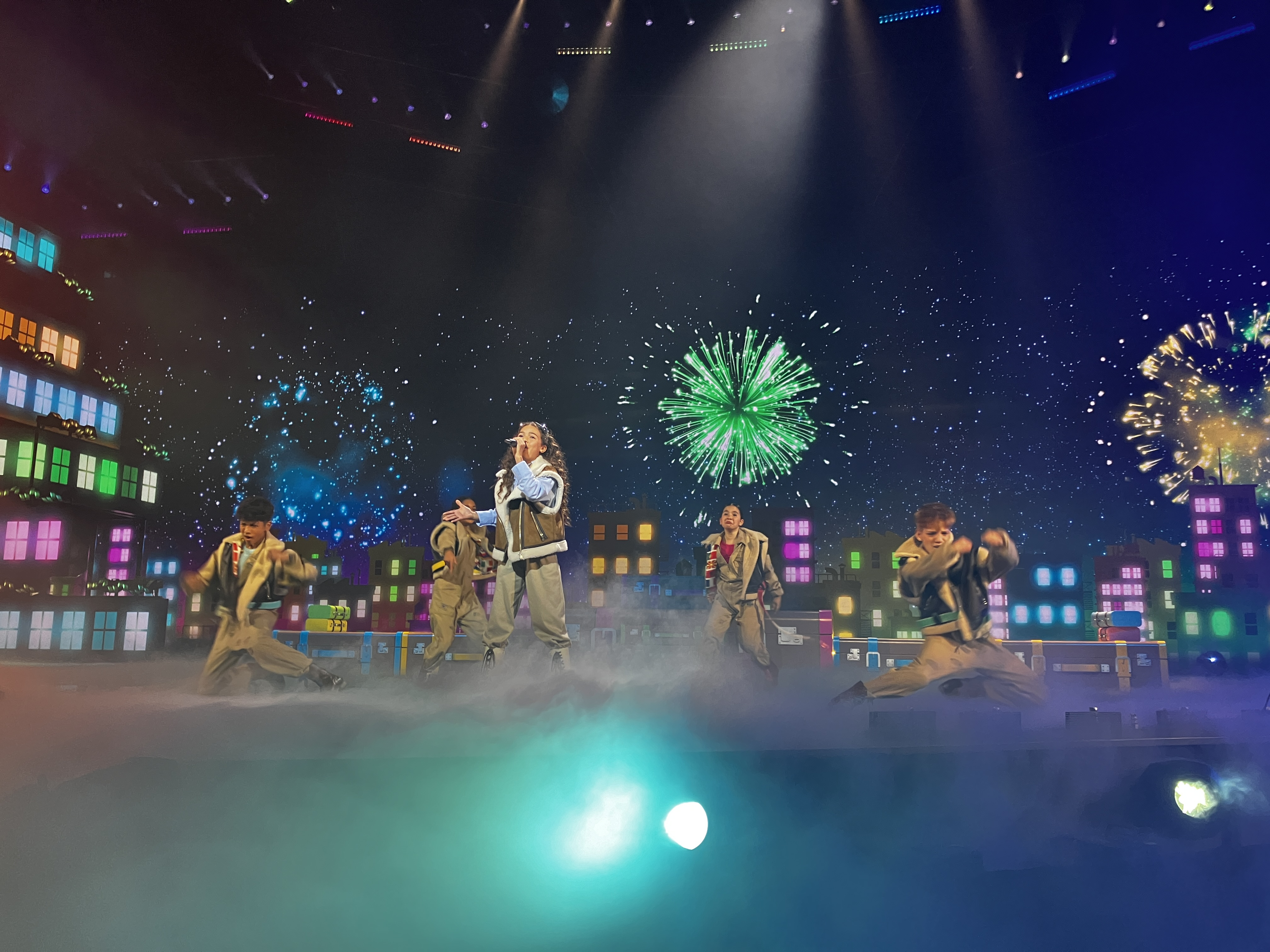
Sandra Valero in Nice (2023)

== See also ==
- Spain in the Eurovision Song Contest – Senior version of the Junior Eurovision Song Contest.
