= Norway in the Junior Eurovision Song Contest =

- Junior Eurovision Song Contest
- Participating broadcaster: Norsk rikskringkasting (NRK)

Participation summary
- Appearances: 3
- First appearance: 2003
- Last appearance: 2005
- Highest placement: 3rd: 2005
- Host: 2004
- Participation history: 2003; 2004; 2005; 2006 – 2026

Related articles
- MGPjr
- For the most recent participation see Norway in the Junior Eurovision Song Contest 2005

Norway has been represented at the Junior Eurovision Song Contest three times. The Norwegian participating broadcaster in the contest is Norsk rikskringkasting (NRK). NRK was the host of the 2004 contest, held Lillehammer.

== History ==
Norway's best result in the contest came in 2005, when Malin Reitan came third for Norway with the song "Sommer og skolefri". In 2006, NRK decided to withdraw from the contest, along with Sweden's SVT and Denmark's DR as a protest against the excess pressure being put on the singers. Instead, the Scandinavian broadcasters revived MGP Nordic, previously held in 2002. Norway has not participated in the contest since. NRK did, however, send an observer to the junior contest in 2021 despite its non-participation. Shortly after the contest that year, NRK revealed that they collaborated with the host broadcaster France Télévisions in Paris to work on the production of the show and to closely observe how the contest has evolved, raising questions about a possible return in 2022 after a 16-year break.

In May 2023, the EBU talked about how they can work to remove pressure on the participants from Junior Eurovision for the first time since 2005 in hopes that the Nordic broadcasters, including NRK, would approve. Later that year in October, the EBU launched a child safety and protection protocol that aims to remove pressure, in hopes of bringing back the Nordic countries in 2024 and beyond. Despite this, on 4 January 2024, NRK confirmed Norway would not return in 2024. However, three days later it was confirmed that Norway would be evaluating a potential return in 2025, with the broadcaster later deciding to make the recording of the 2004 contest (which it had hosted) available on its online streaming platform to mark the occasion of its 20th anniversary. Polish participating broadcaster TVP mentioned on 14 May 2024 in an article about the contest that a broadcaster from Norway expressed its "initial interest" to participate, but had not yet made a final decision.

== Participation overview ==
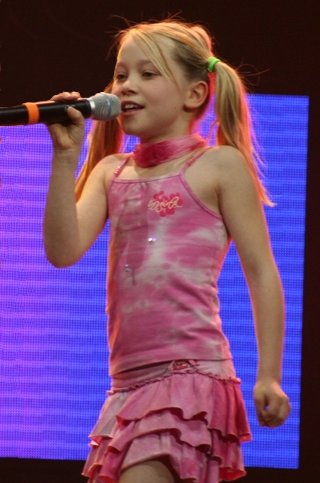
Malin Reitan in Hasselt (2005)

Table key
3	Third place

Year	Artist	Song	Language	Place	Points
2003	2U	"Sinnsykt gal forelsket"	Norwegian	13	18
2004	@lek	"En stjerne skal jeg bli"	Norwegian	13	12
2005	Malin	"Sommer og skolefri"	Norwegian	3	123

== Commentators and spokespersons ==
The contests are broadcast online worldwide through the official Junior Eurovision Song Contest website junioreurovision.tv and YouTube. In 2015, the online broadcasts featured commentary in English by junioreurovision.tv editor Luke Fisher and 2011 Bulgarian Junior Eurovision Song Contest entrant Ivan Ivanov. The Norwegian broadcaster, NRK, sent their own commentators to each contest in order to provide commentary in the Norwegian language. Spokespersons were also chosen by the national broadcaster in order to announce the awarding points from Norway. The table below list the details of each commentator and spokesperson since 2003.

Year(s)	Commentator	Spokesperson
2003	Stian Barsnes-Simonsen	Benna Jimm
2004	Jonna Støme & Marianne Furevold	Ida Margrete Rinde Sunde
2005	Nadia Hasnaoui	Karoline Wendelborg
2006–2026	No broadcast	Did not participate

== Hostings ==
Year	Location	Venue	Presenters
2004	Lillehammer	Håkons Hall	Nadia Hasnaoui and Stian Barsnes-Simonsen

== See also ==
- Norway in the Eurovision Song Contest – Senior version of the Junior Eurovision Song Contest.
