= Area (disambiguation) =

Area is a quantity of a two-dimensional surface. It may also refer to a region.

Area or Areas may also refer to:

== Art, entertainment, and media ==
- AREA (fashion label), American fashion label
- Area (Italian band), an Italian 70s progressive rock and jazz fusion band
- Area (Macedonian band), a Macedonian rock band
- Area (EP), a 2005 EP by the Futureheads
- Area (journal), a journal published by the Royal Geographical Society
- Area (Sirius XM), a music channel
- Area, a common synonym for one of the parts of the shared virtual environment, called a zone (video games)
- "Area", B-side of the 1991 Orchestral Manoeuvres in the Dark single "Then You Turn Away"
- At Area, a South Korean music label

== Fauna ==
- Area (moth), a genus of moths in the family Pyralidae
- Areas (moth), a genus of moths in the family Arctiidae

== Geography ==
- Area (geography) or region
- Geographic surface area, the extent of a geogaphic region

== Organisations ==
- Area (LDS Church), a geographical division within The Church of Jesus Christ of Latter-day Saints
- Area (nightclub), a nightclub that existed in New York City from 1983 to 1987
- AREA, American Railway Engineering Association

== Other uses ==
- Area (architecture), an excavated space around the walls of a building
- Area (graph drawing), in graph drawing, a way of measuring its quality
- 'Area, a village on the island of Rapa Iti, French Polynesia
- <area></area>, an HTML element, see HTML element#area
- Hectare, a measure of area equal to 100 ares

== See also ==
- Areal (disambiguation)
