= Macedonia in the Junior Eurovision Song Contest 2006 =

Song contest

- Junior Eurovision Song Contest 2006
- Participating broadcaster: Macedonian Radio Television (MRT)
- Country: Macedonia
- Selection process: Izbor na pesna za Detski Evrosong 2006
- Selection date: 16 September 2006

Competing entry
- Song: "Vljubena"
- Artist: Zana Aliu
- Songwriter: Zana Aliu

Placement
- Final result: 15th, 14 points

Participation chronology

Macedonia (Note: Presented under the provisional appellation "former Yugoslav Republic of Macedonia", abbreviated "FYR Macedonia".) was represented at the Junior Eurovision Song Contest 2006 with the song "Vljubena", written and performed by Zana Aliu. The Macedonian participating broadcaster, Macedonian Radio Television (MRT), selected its entry for the contest through a national final.

== Before Junior Eurovision ==
=== Izbor na pesna za Detski Evrosong 2006 ===
The Macedonian Radio Television (MRT) opened the submission window for the national final on 27 February 2006 and closed it on 30 March 2006.

The final was held on 16 September 2006 at 18:00 CET and was broadcast on MTV 1 and MKTV Sat. There were 10 participants and the results were decided by a jury and televoting. The jury consisted of Aleksandar Džambazov, Lambe Alabakovski, Denis Dimoski, Julijana Zabaeva and Avni Aliu. The show was opened by Area with the song “Ne sakam, sakam”. The running order of the national final is currently unknown.

Final - 16 September 2006
Artist	Song	Jury	Televote	Total	Place
Damjan Karanfilov and Goran Pavlovski	"Vljuben" ("Вљубен")	4	6	10	9
Fikrija Tair and Patricija Gjorgjieva	"Ritam brz" ("Ритам брз")	25	15	40	2
Ivona Bogoevska and Simona Poposka	"Disko" ("Диско")	10	4	14	8
Ivona Popčevska	"Poubav tandem" ("Поубав тандем")	8	12	20	7
Laura Krliu	"Tika tik" ("Тика тик")	12	10	22	6
Milanka Noveska	"Omilena" ("Омилена")	15	18	33	3
Nataša Trajkovska	"Što da pravam" ("Што да правам")	18	8	26	4
Sofija Karapeeva and Zorica Ilievska	"Petok večer" ("Петок вечер")	3	21	24	5
Stefani Brzanova	"Za prv pat vljubena" ("За прв пат вљубена")	6	3	9	10
Zana Aliu	"Vljubena" ("Вљубена")	21	25	46	1

== At Junior Eurovision ==
At the running order draw on 17 October 2006, Macedonia was drawn to perform ninth on 2 December 2006, following Malta and preceding Sweden.

=== Voting ===
Points awarded to Macedonia
Score	Country
12 points (Note: All countries received one set of 12 points to ensure no country finished with nul points.)	
10 points	
8 points	
7 points	
6 points	
5 points	
4 points	
3 points	
2 points	Romania
1 point	

Points awarded by Macedonia
Score	Country
12 points	Croatia
10 points	Serbia
8 points	Spain
7 points	Malta
6 points	Romania
5 points	Belarus
4 points	Russia
3 points	Cyprus
2 points	Sweden
1 point	Belgium
