= Belgium in the Junior Eurovision Song Contest 2006 =

- Junior Eurovision Song Contest 2006
- Participating broadcaster: Vlaamse Radio- en Televisieomroeporganisatie (VRT)
- Country: Belgium
- Selection process: Eurosong for Kids 2006
- Selection date: 1 October 2006

Competing entry
- Song: "Een tocht door het donker"
- Artist: Thor!
- Songwriter: Thor Salden

Placement
- Final result: 7th, 71 points

Participation chronology

Belgium was represented at the Junior Eurovision Song Contest 2006 with the song "Een tocht door het donker", written and performed by Thor!. The Belgian participating broadcaster, Vlaamse Radio- en Televisieomroeporganisatie (VRT), selected its entry for the contest with a national final titled Eurosong for Kids 2006, consisting of 10 songs competing over two semi-finals and a final.

== Before Eurovision ==
=== Eurosong for Kids 2006 ===
Eurosong for Kids was the national final organised by Belgian broadcaster Vlaamse Radio- en Televisieomroeporganisatie (VRT) to select its entry for the Junior Eurovision Song Contest 2006

==== Format ====
The format of the competition consisted of three shows: two semi-finals and a final. In all shows, the results were based on the votes from a three-member adult "expert" jury, a kids jury, Radio 2 jury, Radio Donna jury and televoting. The televote counted for 1/3 of the overall vote, with the other 4 juries counting for 1/6. The members of the "expert" jury were Els De Schepper, Heidi Lenaerts and Ronny Mosuse. The winning song from each semi-final qualified for the final along with the 3 overall best scoring non-winners.

==== Semi-final ====
The first semi-final took place on 17 September 2006. Thor! advanced directly for the final, winning the semi-final with 70 points. Lizz@xy and Attic also qualified as two of the three overall best scoring non-winners with 67 and 60 points respectively.

Semi-final 1 – 17 September 2006
R/O	Artist	Song	Jury	Televote	Total	Place
1	Kristel	"Zal je ooit"	34	18	52	4
2	Attic	"Ik doe alle dingen"	40	20	60	3
3	Suzanne	"Zeg het mij"	35	16	51	5
4	Lizz@xy	"Ik doe wat ik wil"	45	22	67	2
5	Thor!	"Een tocht door het donker"	46	24	70	1

Detailed Jury Votes
R/O	Song	Expert Jury	Kids Jury	Radio 2	Radio Donna	Total
1	"Zal je ooit"	8	8	9	9	34
2	"Ik doe alle dingen"	9	10	10	11	40
3	"Zeg het mij"	10	9	8	8	35
4	"Ik doe wat ik wil"	12	11	12	10	45
5	"Een tocht door het donker"	11	12	11	12	46

==== Semi-final 2 ====
The second semi-final took place on 24 September 2006. The Fireflies advanced directly for the final, winning the semi-final with 71 points. Nicolas also qualified as one of the three overall best scoring non-winners with 62 points.

Semi-final 2 – 24 September 2006
R/O	Artist	Song	Jury	Televote	Total	Place
1	Nikkie	"Echte vrienden"	39	16	55	4
2	Nicolas	"Ik wil je nooit meer kwijt"	40	22	62	2
3	Arlieke	"Waarom liet je mij daar staan"	36	18	54	5
4	Melissa	"Hé jij"	37	20	57	3
5	The Fireflies	"Waarom?"	47	24	71	1

Detailed Jury Votes
R/O	Song	Expert Jury	Kids Jury	Radio 2	Radio Donna	Total
1	"Echte vrienden"	11	9	9	10	39
2	"Ik wil je nooit meer kwijt"	10	10	12	9	40
3	"Waarom liet je mij daar staan"	9	11	8	8	36
4	"Hé jij"	8	8	10	11	37
5	"Waarom?"	12	12	11	12	47

==== Final ====
The final was held on 1 October 2006. The winner was "Een tocht door het donker" performed by Thor!.

Final – 1 October 2006
R/O	Artist	Song	Jury	Televote	Total	Place
1	Thor!	"Een tocht door het donker"	47	24	71	1
2	The Fireflies	"Waarom?"	39	20	59	2
3	Lizz@xy	"Ik doe wat ik wil"	35	22	57	3
4	Attic	"Ik doe alle dingen"	39	18	57	3
5	Nicolas	"Ik wil je nooit meer kwijt"	40	16	56	5

Detailed Jury Votes
R/O	Song	Expert Jury	Kids Jury	Radio 2	Radio Donna	Total
1	"Een tocht door het donker"	12	12	12	11	47
2	"Waarom?"	11	10	9	9	39
3	"Ik doe wat ik wil"	8	11	8	8	35
4	"Ik doe alle dingen"	9	9	11	10	39
5	"Ik wil je nooit meer kwijt"	10	8	10	12	40

== At Eurovision ==
At Junior Eurovision, Belgium performed in thirteenth position, before Croatia and after Belarus. Belgium placed in 7th position with 71 points; the highest of which was 10 points, which came from Croatia.

=== Voting ===
Points awarded to Belgium
Score	Country
12 points (Note: All countries received one set of 12 points to ensure no country finished with nul points.)	
10 points	Croatia
8 points	Netherlands
7 points	
6 points	Malta; Romania
5 points	Spain
4 points	Belarus; Portugal; Russia
3 points	Cyprus; Ukraine
2 points	Greece; Serbia
1 point	Macedonia; Sweden

Points awarded by Belgium
Score	Country
12 points	Russia
10 points	Sweden
8 points	Netherlands
7 points	Spain
6 points	Belarus
5 points	Serbia
4 points	Malta
3 points	Greece
2 points	Romania
1 point	Ukraine
