= María Isabel =

Spanish singer (born 1995)

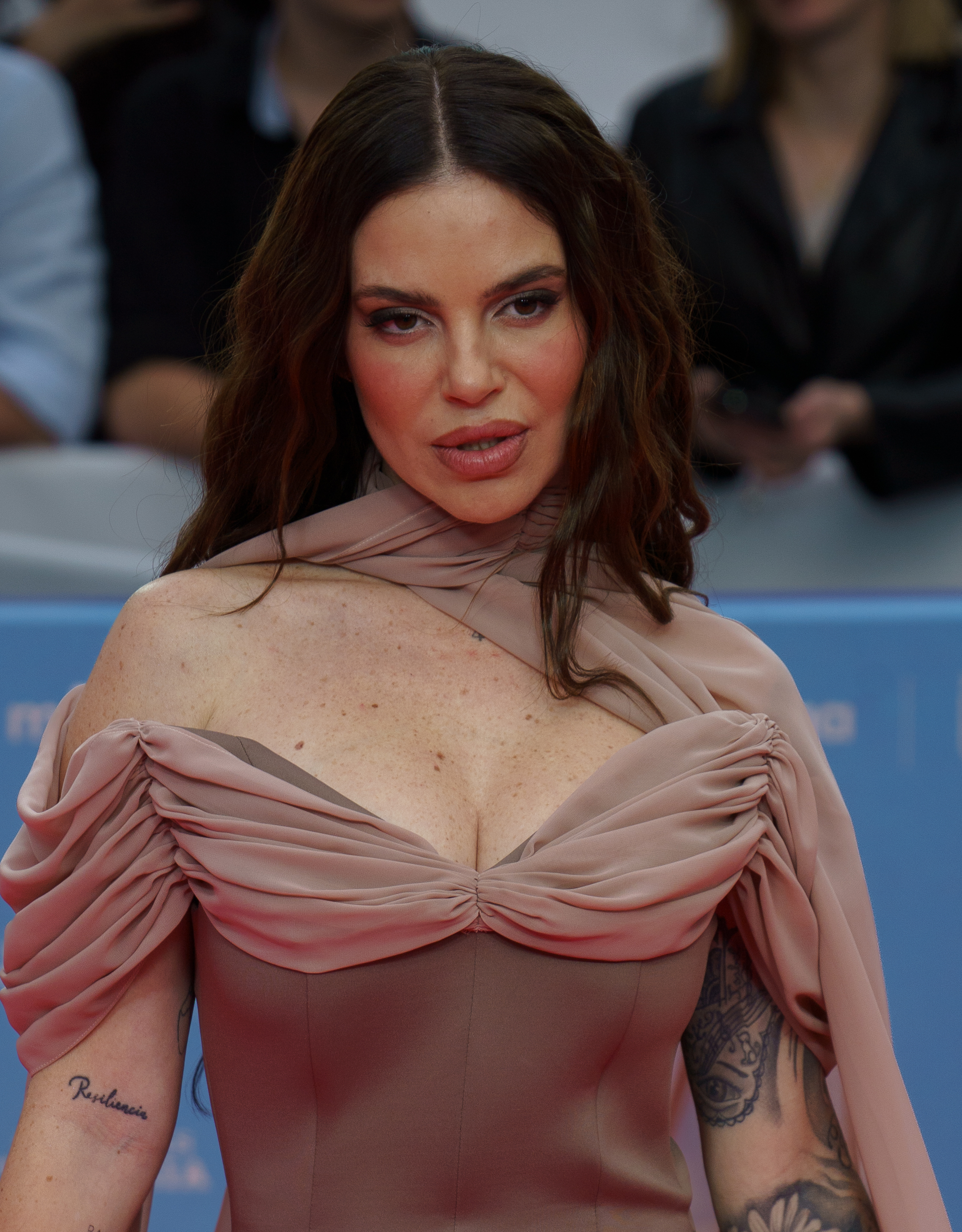
- María Isabel in 2025

Background information
- Born: María Isabel López Rodríguez; 4 January 1995 (age 31); Ayamonte (Huelva), Spain
- Genres: Latin pop; electropop; dance-pop
- Occupation: Singer
- Instrument: Vocals
- Years active: 2004–present
- Labels: UMG; Vale; Nueva Generación de Artistas

María Isabel López Rodríguez (born 4 January 1995), known professionally as María Isabel, is a Spanish singer. She rose to prominence after she won the Junior Eurovision Song Contest 2004 for Spain with the song "Antes muerta que sencilla".

== Biography ==
On 4 January 1995, María Isabel was born in Ayamonte (Huelva), Spain. She demonstrated an interest in dancing and singing from a very young age.

=== Junior Eurovision ===
Between 7 and 21 September 2004, she competed with "Antes muerta que sencilla" and "Mira niño" in Eurojunior 2004, the national selection organised by Televisión Española (TVE) to select its song and performer for the 2nd edition of the Junior Eurovision Song Contest. "Antes muerta que sencilla" won the competition becoming the Spanish entrant, and María Isabel the performer, for Junior Eurovision. On 2 November 2004, she released her first album ¡No me toques las palmas que me conozco! of which "Antes muerta que sencilla" was the first single.

On 20 November 2004, the Junior Eurovision Song Contest was held at the Håkons Hall in Lillehammer hosted by the Norwegian Broadcasting Corporation (NRK), and broadcast live throughout the continent. She performed "Antes muerta que sencilla" fifteenth on the evening. At the close of voting, the song had received 171 points, winning the competition, and setting a record for both largest score and largest winning margin (31 points). Her largest score record was broken by 2015 winner, Destiny Chukunyere. Her winning margin record was broken by the 2012 winner, Anastasiya Petryk, who won with a 35-point margin.

Winning at the age of nine years, ten months, and sixteen days old, she is the youngest person to win the contest to date (a few days younger than the Tolmachevy Sisters, the only other nine year-old winners).

=== After Junior Eurovision ===
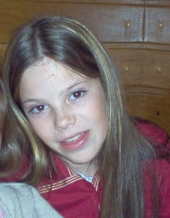
María Isabel in 2007

"Antes Muerta que Sencilla" became an instant radio hit in Spain, and was later promoted in Latin America, where María Isabel's album was released in 2005. Milly Cangiano, a Puerto Rican television show host, made the song's title one of the catchphrases she uses daily during her show.

In addition, María Isabel began her first tour of Latin America and the United States after the album's release. Her song became a chart-topper in Argentina, Colombia, and Puerto Rico, among others. In April 2005, she was interviewed on American nationwide television for the first time, when she was presented on Univision's El Gordo y la Flaca and chatted with hosts Lili Estefan and Raúl De Molina.

María Isabel continued school, but on weekends and school holidays she would travel throughout Spain giving concerts as well as interviews for the media. She became a regular performer in Benalmádena's Tivoli World amusement park.

Her second album, released on 2 October 2005, was titled Número 2. It includes the songs "Pues va a ser que no" and "En mi jardín". These songs are part of the Spanish soundtrack of the Barbie film Barbie and the Magic of Pegasus. Her third album, Capricornio, was released on 21 November 2006 and peaked at number 11 on the Spanish Albums Chart. It is a double disc set which also includes a DVD with all of her videoclips and extras.

Her fourth studio album is a collection of songs from the first movie she starred in, Ángeles S.A.. Due to management and release problems, the soundtrack album entered the Spanish charts at number 35, however it later peaked at number 7, certifying it gold.

In 2009–10 she hosted the children's show Los Lunnis on Televisión Española. In November 2009 she released her fifth album, Los Lunnis con María Isabel, which contained the songs from the show as well as two original tracks.

=== Career as an adult ===
After a career hiatus in order to finish her studies, María Isabel returned to music in 2015, eleven years after her debut, with her sixth studio album, Yo Decido.

On 29 December 2015, she was announced as one of the six candidates to represent Spain in the Eurovision Song Contest 2016. She took part in the televised national final organised by Televisión Española with a song composed by David Santisteban and titled “La vida sólo es una”, the first single from Yo Decido. She came 4th with 68 points.

On 5 July 2019, María Isabel released a single titled "Tu mirada".

In April 2024, it was reported that RTVE had started negotiations with María Isabel to be a guest or host the contest on the occasion of the 20th anniversary of her victory in 2004.

== Personal life ==
Isabel is engaged to Jesús Marchena, with whom she has a daughter, Daliana (born 14 February 2023).

== Discography ==
=== Albums ===
Year	Album	Peak positions		Sales and certifications
Year	Album	SPA	TUR	Sales and certifications
2004	¡No me toques las palmas que me conozco!: First studio album; Released: 2 November 2004; Label: Universal Music Spain (Vale Music); Format: CD, download	1	23	500 000 (5× Platinum)
2005	Número 2: Second studio album; Released: 2 October 2005; Label: Universal Music Spain (Vale Music); Formats: CD, digital download	7	—	300 000 (3× Platinum)
2006	Capricornio: Third studio album; Released: 21 November 2006; Label: Universal Music Spain (Vale Music); Formats: CD, digital download	11	—	80 000 (Platinum)
2007	Ángeles S.A.: Soundtrack; Fourth studio album; Released: 27 November 2007; Label: Universal Music Spain; Format: CD, digital download	7	—	100 000 (Platinum)
2009	Los Lunnis con María Isabel: Soundtrack with new songs by María Isabel; Released: 10 November 2009; Label: Universal Music Spain; Format: CD	68	—	
2015	Yo decido: Released: 27 November 2015; Label: Nueva Generación de Artistas; Format: CD, digital download	—	—	

=== Singles ===
Year	Single	Peak positions			
Year	Single	BEL	CH	FRA	SPA
2004	"Antes muerta que sencilla"	36	8	6	1
2004	"¡No me toques las palmas que me conozco!"	–	–	–	2
2004	"La vida es bella"	–	–	–	8
2005	"Pues va a ser que no"	–	–	–	1
2006	"En mi jardín (Hope Has Wings)"; Brie Larson's cover from Barbie and the Magic of Pegasus	–	–	–	6
2006	"Quién da la vez" Promo only	–	–	–	–
2006	"De qué vas"	–	–	–	56
2007	"Cometas de cristal" Promo only	–	–	–	–
2007	"Cuando no estás"	–	–	–	–
2009	"Cosquillitas"	–	–	–	–
2015	"La vida sólo es una"	–	–	–	–
2019	"Tu mirada"	–	–	–	–
2019	"Flamenkita"	–	–	–	–
2020	"Esa carita" Collaboration with Juan Magán, adaptation from 1998 Indonesian song Bagaikan Langit by Indonesian band Potret	–	–	–	–

== Filmography ==
Year	Film	Role	Notes
2007	Ángeles S.A.	María Isabel	Lead Role
2009–10	Los Lunnis	As herself	TV series

Awards and achievements
Preceded by Sergio with "Desde el cielo"	Spain in the Junior Eurovision Song Contest; 2004	Succeeded by Antonio José with "Te traigo flores"
Preceded by (Croatia) Dino Jelusić with "Ti si moja prva ljubav"	Winner of the Junior Eurovision Song Contest; 2004	Succeeded by (Belarus) Ksenia Sitnik with "My vmeste"
