= Alexey Zhigalkovich =

Belarusian singer (born 1996)

Alexey Zhigalkovich Аляксей Жыгалковіч
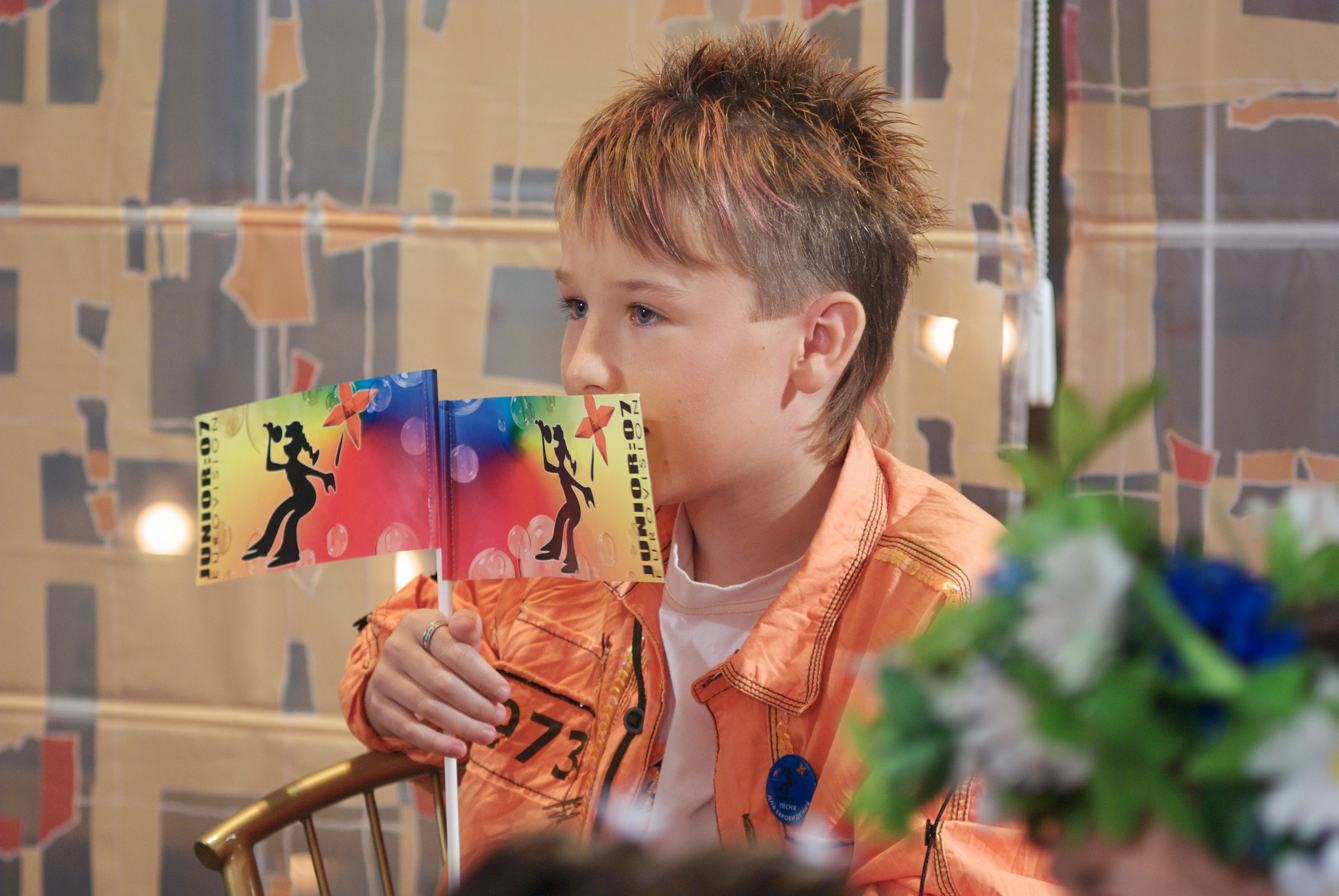

Background information
- Born: 18 April 1996 (age 30)
- Origin: Minsk, Belarus
- Instrument: Vocals

Alexey Alexandrovich Zhigalkovich (Belarusian: Аляксей Аляксандравіч Жыгалковіч; born 18 April 1996 in Minsk) is a Belarusian singer. He participated in the Junior Eurovision Song Contest 2007 and won with one point more than the Armenian runner up. He sang the song "S druz'yami" (С друзьями. "With friends", in russian). It was a song with a fast tempo and energetic dancing. He wrote this song himself.

He was the second winner of this contest from Belarus, after Ksenia Sitnik in 2005. His win also marked the first time a country had won the Junior contest twice.

Alexey is a prize-winner of several other international musical contests in Belarus, Italy and Bulgaria:

- 2005: He sang Lo zio Bé (Дзе каза рогам) at the Italian song contest Zecchino d'Oro. The song won the Zecchino d'Argento prize for the best non-Italian song.
- 2006: II prize for children singers at the Slavianski Bazaar in Vitebsk

Awards and achievements
Preceded by Andrey Kunets with "Novyi den"	Belarus in the Junior Eurovision Song Contest; 2007	Succeeded by Dasha, Alina & Karyna with "Serdtse Belarusi"
Preceded by (Russia) Tolmachevy Twins with "Vesenniy Jazz"	Winner of the Junior Eurovision Song Contest; 2007	Succeeded by (Georgia (country)) Bzikebi with "Bzz.."
