= Portugal in the Junior Eurovision Song Contest 2006 =

- Junior Eurovision Song Contest 2006
- Participating broadcaster: Rádio e Televisão de Portugal (RTP)
- Country: Portugal
- Selection process: Festival da Canção Júnior 06
- Selection date: 29 September 2006

Competing entry
- Song: "Deixa-me sentir"
- Artist: Pedro Madeira
- Songwriters: Telmo Falcão; Pedro Madeira

Placement
- Final result: 14th, 22 points

Participation chronology

Portugal was represented at the Junior Eurovision Song Contest 2006 with the song "Deixa-me sentir", written by Telmo Falcão and Pedro Madeira, and performed by Madeira himself. The Portuguese participating broadcaster, Rádio e Televisão de Portugal (RTP), selected its entry through a national final called Festival da Canção Júnior 06. This was the first-ever entry from Portugal in the Junior Eurovision Song Contest.

== Before Junior Eurovision ==
=== Festival da Canção Júnior 06 ===
Rádio e Televisão de Portugal (RTP) opened the submission window for Festival da Canção 06 from 17 June until 4 August 2006 and by the end of the submission window, 72 songs were received. A jury consisting of Ramon Galarza, Fernando Martins and Inês Santos narrowed the list down to 14. Then another jury consisting of young experts chose the 10 participants which were announced on 1 September 2006. Sara Afonso Gonçalves’ song “Folhas de Vento” was disqualified and was replaced by João Ferreira.

The final was held on 29 September 2006 at Tivoli Theater, Lisbon and was broadcast on RTP1 and RTP Internacional. The hosts of the final were Jorge Gabriel and Helena Coelho. The final results were chosen by televoting. Interval acts featured Doce Juniors, Mega 7 and Grupo de Danca do BCM. The top 3 results were revealed in percentages during the live show and some time later the full results were revealed.

Final – 29 September 2006
R/O	Artist	Song	Songwriter(s)	Votes	Place
1	Mariana António	"Só eu sei (O que quero)"	Ana Conceição Vieira; Artur Santos; Mariana António; Miguel Fernandes	2,717	8
2	União Verbal	"HRP (Historía e Rapugrafia de Portugal)"	Gustavo Almeida	3,366	6
3	Trio da Pop	"Ouve o teu coração e canta"	Adriana Cardoso; Gisela Canelhas; Judit Cruz; Sara Bóleo	1,341	10
4	Tiago Batista	"Só quero um Mundo melhor"	Tiago Batista	2,887	7
5	Pedro Madeira	"Deixa-me sentir"	Pedro Madeira; Telmo Falcão	9,360	1
6	Marisa Almeida	"Há sempre uma canção"	Edviges Pacheco; Marisa Almeida	4,606	5
7	Ana Rita Ribeiro	"Uma canção fora de moda"	Ana Rita Ribeiro; Marcus Levy	5,117	3
8	Daniela Pinto	"Tudo o que penso"	Menito Ramos; Miguel Máximo	4,668	4
9	Bárbara Pinho	"Nas noites de Paris"	Leandro Pinho	7,538	2
10	João Ferreira	"Sonho de Verão"	Eduardo Vaz Paulo; João Ferreira	1,659	9

== At Junior Eurovision ==
At the running order draw on 17 October 2006, Portugal was drawn to perform first on 2 December 2006, preceding Cyprus.

=== Voting ===
Points awarded to Portugal
Score	Country
12 points (Note: All countries received one set of 12 points to ensure no country finished with nul points.)	
10 points	
8 points	
7 points	Spain
6 points	
5 points	
4 points	
3 points	Malta
2 points	
1 point	

Points awarded by Portugal
Score	Country
12 points	Belarus
10 points	Russia
8 points	Sweden
7 points	Spain
6 points	Romania
5 points	Ukraine
4 points	Belgium
3 points	Cyprus
2 points	Serbia
1 point	Malta
