= Ukraine in the Junior Eurovision Song Contest 2006 =

- Junior Eurovision Song Contest 2006
- Participating broadcaster: National Television Company of Ukraine (NTU)
- Country: Ukraine
- Selection process: Dytiache Yevrobachennia vidbirkovyi tur 06
- Selection date: 23 September 2006

Competing entry
- Song: "Khlopchyk Rock 'n' Roll"
- Artist: Nazar Slyusarchuk
- Songwriters: Nazar Slyusarchuk

Placement
- Final result: 9th, 58 points

Participation chronology

Ukraine was represented at the Junior Eurovision Song Contest 2006 with the song "Khlopchyk Rock 'n' Roll", written and performed by Nazar Slyusarchuk. The Ukrainian participating broadcaster, National Television Company of Ukraine (NTU), selected its entry through a national final. This was the first-ever entry from Ukraine in the Junior Eurovision Song Contest.

== Before Junior Eurovision ==
=== Dytiache Yevrobachennia vidbirkovyi tur 06 ===
The National Television Company of Ukraine (NTU) opened the submission window for the national final on 6 July 2006 and closed it on 6 August 2006. By the deadline, over sixty entries were received but due to issues in the application form, 57 entries got to the contest, which of them twenty were selected for the internal semi-final by a jury on from 7 to 14 August 2006.

The jury consisted of Irina Bilyk, Mykhaylo Chemberzhi, Olena Mozhova, Oksana Mozhova, Serhiy Kuzin, Vitaliy Klymov and Yevhen Kalenskyi.

==== Internal Semi-Final ====
The internal semi-final was held on 20 August 2006 in NTU studios. From the semi-finalists the jury chose ten finalists, which were announced on 23 August 2006 in a press conference, with their song titles being revealed on 13 September 2006.

Qualified

Internal semi-final - 20 August 2006
Artist	Song	Result
Alina Popova	"Bystra rika" ("Бистра ріка")	Qualified
Anastasiia Prudius	"Kryla chekannia" ("Крила чекання")	—N/a
Chugaivna	"Ruzha" ("Ружа")	—N/a
Ilona Halytska	"Razom my" ("Разом ми")	Qualified
Kateryna Pashchenko	"Chortenia" ("Чортеня") (Note: Song title changed to "I tato, i mama" ("І тато, і мама") in the final)	Qualified
Khrystyna Barabulia	"Veselkova kraina" ("Веселкова країна")	—N/a
Liza Marchenko	"Ya liubliu" ("Я люблю")	—N/a
Mariia Stepanenko	"Pivdennyi viter" ("Південний вітер") (Note: Song title changed to "Kokhannia ne vbyvay" ("Кохання не вбивай") in the final)	Qualified
Mariia Yaremenko	"Miy chovnyk (Kapitan)" ("Мій човник (Капітан)")	Qualified
Marietta	"Alo" ("Ало")	—N/a
Mykhaylo Oleniuk	"Luna" ("Луна")	—N/a
Nataliia Tsar	"Topolyna" ("Тополина")	—N/a
Nazar Slyusarchuk	"Khlopchyk Rock-n-Roll" ("Хлопчик Рок-н-рол")	Qualified
Nikita Alekseev	Unknown	—N/a
Olha Bohatyrenko	"Ya zlitaiu do nebes" ("Я злітаю до небес")	Qualified
Rostyslav Todoresku	"Ukraina Forever"	—N/a
Viktoria Petryk	"Hoydalka" ("Гойдалка")	Qualified
Yuliia Havrylenko	"Svitla pisnia" ("Світла пісня") (Note: Song title changed to "Sviato" ("Свято") in the final)	Qualified
Yuliia Petrenko	"Peppi - zolote serce" ("Пеппі - золоте серце")	—N/a
Yuliia Shpakevich	"Bilyi metelyk" ("Білий метелик") (Note: Song title changed to "Divochi sny" ("Дівочі сни") in the final)	Qualified

==== Final ====
The final was held on 23 September 2006 at 18:10 CEST in the NTU studios and was broadcast live on Pershyi Natsionalnyi. The show was hosted by Maria Orlova and Timur Miroshnychenko. The guest performers of the show included Alibi, Assol, Ex-prezydenty, Kirill Turichenko and Tatiana Nedelskaya. The results of the final were decided by only televoting consisting of phone voting and SMS voting.

Final – 23 September 2006
R/O	Artist	Song	Songwriter(s)	Phone	SMS	Total	Place
1	Yuliia Shpakevich	"Divochi sny" ("Дівочі сни")	Yuliia Shpakevich	268	677	945	8
2	Alina Popova	"Bystra rika" ("Бистра ріка")	Alina Popova	520	1,084	1,604	7
3	Olha Bohatyrenko	"Ya zlitaiu do nebes" ("Я злітаю до небес")	Olha Bohatyrenko; Yana Holovchenko	173	391	564	10
4	Kateryna Pashchenko	"I tato, i mama" ("І тато, і мама")	Kateryna Pashchenko	134	688	822	9
5	Nazar Slyusarchuk	"Khlopchyk Rock-n-Roll" ("Хлопчик Рок-н-рол")	Nazar Slyusarchuk	889	4,713	5,602	1
6	Mariia Stepanenko	"Kokhannia ne vbyvay" ("Кохання не вбивай")	Mariia Stepanenko	388	1,396	1,784	5
7	Viktoria Petryk	"Hoydalka" ("Гойдалка")	Viktoria Petryk	628	2,144	2,772	2
8	Mariia Yaremenko	"Miy chovnyk" ("Мій човник")	Mariia Yaremenko	256	1,364	1,620	6
9	Yuliia Havrylenko	"Sviato" ("Свято")	Valeriia Zablotska	356	1,656	2,012	3
10	Ilona Halytska	"Razom my" ("Разом ми")	Ilona Halytska	458	1,463	1,921	4

== At Junior Eurovision ==
At the running order draw on 17 October 2006, Greece was drawn to perform fifth on 2 December 2006, following Romania and preceding Spain.

=== Voting ===
Points awarded to Ukraine
Score	Country
12 points (Note: All countries received one set of 12 points to ensure no country finished with nul points.)	
10 points	
8 points	Belarus; Russia
7 points	
6 points	Spain
5 points	Malta; Portugal
4 points	Greece; Romania
3 points	Croatia
2 points	Cyprus
1 point	Belgium

Points awarded by Ukraine
Score	Country
12 points	Russia
10 points	Belarus
8 points	Sweden
7 points	Serbia
6 points	Spain
5 points	Cyprus
4 points	Romania
3 points	Belgium
2 points	Croatia
1 point	Malta
