= Serbia in the Junior Eurovision Song Contest 2006 =

- Junior Eurovision Song Contest 2006
- Country: Serbia
- Selection process: National Final
- Selection date: 1 October 2006

Competing entry
- Song: "Učimo strane jezike"
- Artist: Neustrašivi učitelji stranih jezika

Placement
- Final result: 5th, 81 points

Participation chronology

Serbia selected their Junior Eurovision entry for 2006 through a national final consisting of 10 songs. The winning song was selected exclusively by televoting, which was band Neustrašivi učitelji stranih jezika with "Učimo strane jezike".

== Before Junior Eurovision ==
=== National final ===
Ten songs competed in the final, held on 1 October 2006 in the Millennium Hall in Vršac, hosted by Bojana Stefanović, Sofija Juričan and Miki Damjanović. The winner was decided exclusively by SMS voting. "Učimo strane jezike" performed by Neustrašivi učitelji stranih jezika was selected as the winner.

Final – 1 October 2006
Draw	Artist	Song	Composer(s)	Televote	Place
1	Neustrašivi učitelji stranih jezika	"Učimo strane jezike" (Учимо стране језике)	Neustrašivi učitelji stranih jezika	129	1
2	Dunja Divić	"Mirisna pesma" (Мирисна песма)	Dunja Divić	24	10
3	Betty Boop	"Tajna" (Тајна)	Tara Krlić, Kristina Krspogačin	46	7
4	Kristina Kiki Ivanović	"Šaš, bles, tres, hajmo svi na ples" (Шаш, блес, трес, хајмо сви на плес)	Kristina Ivanović, Lukijan Ivanović	42	8
5	Isidora Tubin	"Zaljubljena Mina" (Заљубљена Мина)	Isidora Tubin	84	4
6	Filip Trajanovski	"Ponovo sam" (Поново сам)	Filip Trajanovski	66	5
7	Gorana Jablanović	"Ovog vikenda" (Овог викенда)	Gorana Jablanović	39	9
8	Teodora, Katarina, Isidora and Miona	"Noć leptira i vila" (Ноћ лептира и вила)	Teodora Marković, Sara Marković	124	2
9	Branko Miljković Oskar	"Zašto te volim?" (Зашто те волим?)	Branko Miljković Oskar	115	3
10	Tijana and Sara	"Pet" (Пет)	Tijana Cogoljević, Sara Abramović	57	6

== At Junior Eurovision ==
=== Voting ===
Points awarded to Serbia
Score	Country
12 points (Note: All countries received one set of 12 points to ensure no country finished with nul points.)	
10 points	Macedonia
8 points	
7 points	Malta; Russia; Ukraine
6 points	
5 points	Belarus; Belgium; Croatia; Netherlands; Romania
4 points	Cyprus; Sweden
3 points	
2 points	Portugal; Spain
1 point	Greece

Points awarded by Serbia
Score	Country
12 points	Russia
10 points	Croatia
8 points	Sweden
7 points	Greece
6 points	Belarus
5 points	Netherlands
4 points	Romania
3 points	Spain
2 points	Belgium
1 point	Malta
