= Junior Eurovision Song Contest 2006 =

International song competition for youth

- Let the Music Play

Date and venue
- Final: 2 December 2006
- Venue: Sala Polivalentă; Bucharest, Romania

Organisation
- Organiser: European Broadcasting Union (EBU)
- Executive supervisor: Svante Stockselius

Production
- Host broadcaster: Televiziunea Română (TVR)
- Director: Dan Manoliu
- Executive producer: Irina Radu
- Presenters: Andreea Marin Bănică, Ioana Ivan

Participants
- Number of entries: 15
- Debuting countries: Portugal; Serbia (Note: Serbia had taken part, in the 2005 contest, as part of Serbia and Montenegro, but this was their first appearance as an independent nation.); Ukraine
- Returning countries: Cyprus
- Non-returning countries: Denmark; Latvia; Norway; Serbia and Montenegro (Note: Ceased to exist as of June 2006.); United Kingdom
- Participation map: Competing countries Countries that participated in the past but not in 2006

Vote
- Voting system: Each country awards 1–8, 10, and 12 points to their 10 favourite songs
- Winning song: Russia "Vesenniy Jazz"

The Junior Eurovision Song Contest 2006 was the fourth edition of the Junior Eurovision Song Contest, held on 2 December 2006 at Sala Polivalentă in Bucharest, Romania, and presented by Andreea Marin Bănică and Ioana Ivan. It was organised by the European Broadcasting Union (EBU) and host broadcaster Televiziunea Română (TVR). It was the second time the contest had been held in a capital city.

The show was broadcast live in the competing countries, as well as Andorra, Bosnia and Herzegovina and the Australian television channel Special Broadcasting Service (SBS) that acquired the rights for broadcasting the show, which was broadcast on 1 January 2007. This was Serbia's first appearance in any Eurovision event as an independent nation.

The winner was Russia with the song "Vesenniy Jazz" by The Tolmachevy Twins.

== Location ==
Locations of the bidding countries. The eliminated countries are marked in red. The chosen host country is marked in blue.

=== Bidding phase and host selection ===
On 5 October 2005, it was confirmed that TVR had won the rights of hosting the contest over AVRO of the Netherlands (who would later be announced as the host broadcaster of the next contest). Croatia also expressed an interest in hosting this contest.

=== Venue ===
Sala Polivalentă in Bucharest, venue of the 2006 contest.

Polyvalent Hall from Bucharest (Romanian: Sala Polivalentă din București) is a multi-purpose hall in Bucharest, Romania, located in the Tineretului Park. It is used for concerts, indoor sports such as tennis, gymnastics, dance, handball, volleyball, basketball, weightlifting, combat sports and professional wrestling. The hall was opened in 1974 but has since been renovated. It has a maximum seating capacity of 12,000 for concerts and 6,000 for handball.

== Participants ==
Cover art of the official album

On 16 May 2006, the EBU released the official list of participants with 15 competing countries. Originally 16 countries had initially signed up for the contest but one unspecified country later dropped out. Portugal, Serbia (for the first time as an independent country after the participation in 2005 contest as part of Serbia and Montenegro) and Ukraine made their debut, while Cyprus returned after a one-year absence.

Two broadcasters withdrew from the contest: Radio télévision belge de la communauté française (RTBF) of the French-speaking Wallonia in Belgium left the contest this year, after co-hosting the previous edition with Flemish broadcaster Vlaamse Radio- en Televisieomroep (VRT), claimed that continuing with the contest was not in their interests financially. Belgium continued to be represented at the contest by Flemish broadcaster VRT. Subsequently also Sveriges Television (SVT) of Sweden decided to withdraw from the contest for focusing on organisation of the MGP Nordic in Stockholm; the country continued to be represented at the contest by commercial broadcaster TV4.

Prior to the event, a compilation album featuring all the songs from the 2006 contest, along with karaoke versions, was put together by the European Broadcasting Union and released by Universal Music Group in November 2006.

Participants of the Junior Eurovision Song Contest 2006
| Country | Broadcaster | Artist | Song | Language | Songwriter(s) |
|---|---|---|---|---|---|
| Belarus | BTRC | Andrey Kunets | "Noviy den" (Новый день) | Russian | Andrey Kunets |
| Belgium | VRT | Thor! | "Een tocht door het donker" | Dutch | Thor Salden |
| Croatia | HRT | Mateo Đido | "Lea" | Croatian | Mateo Đido |
| Cyprus | CyBC | Luis Panagiotou and Christina Christofi | "Agoria koritsia" (Αγόρια κορίτσια) | Greek | Christina Christofi; Luis Panagiotou |
| Greece | ERT | Chloe Sofia Boleti | "Den peirazei" (Δεν πειράζει) | Greek | Chloe Sofia Boleti |
| Macedonia | MRT | Zana Aliu | "Vljubena" (Вљубена) | Macedonian | Zana Aliu |
| Malta | PBS | Sophie Debattista | "Extra Cute" | English | Sophie Debattista |
| Netherlands | AVRO | Kimberly Nieuwenhuis | "Goed" | Dutch | Kimberly Nieuwenhuis |
| Portugal | RTP | Pedro Madeira | "Deixa-me sentir" | Portuguese | Telmo Falcão; Pedro Madeira |
| Romania | TVR | New Star Music | "Povestea mea" | Romanian | New Star Music |
| Russia | VGTRK | Tolmachevy Twins | "Vesenniy Jazz" | Russian | Anastasiya Tolmacheva; Maria Tolmacheva |
| Serbia | RTS | Neustrašivi učitelji stranih jezika | "Učimo strane jezike" (Учимо стране језике) | Serbian, English (Note: Contains only 2 lines of chorus in Serbian, while 24 lines of verses are mostly sung in English and a few lines are sung in French, German, Italian, Japanese, Spanish, Russian, and Swedish.) | Neustrašivi učitelji stranih jezika |
| Spain | TVE | Dani Fernández | "Te doy mi voz" | Spanish | Dani Fernández |
| Sweden | TV4 | Molly Sandén | "Det finaste någon kan få" | Swedish | Molly Sandén |
| Ukraine | NTU | Nazar Slyusarchuk | "Khlopchyk Rock 'n' Roll" (Хлопчик рок н рол) | Ukrainian | Nazar Slyusarchuk |

== Format ==
=== Presenters ===
The presenters in charge of conducting the event were Andreea Marin and Ioana Ivan, who also appeared in the green room. Marin has been a presenter at the host broadcaster since 1994 and achieved national fame as the host of Surprize, Surprize, the Romanian version of British light entertainment show Surprise Surprise, on TVR1. Marin has twice appeared on the Eurovision Song Contest, reading out the Romanian televote results in 2004 and 2006. Ivan is an actress and television personality and the first child presenter of the event.

== Contest overview ==
The event took place on 2 December 2006 at 21:15 EET (20:15 CET). Fifteen countries participated, with the running order published in October 2006. All the countries competing were eligible to vote by televote. Russia won with 154 points, with Belarus, Sweden, Spain, and Serbia, completing the top five. Malta, the Netherlands, Greece, Portugal, and Macedonia occupied the bottom five positions.

The show was opened by various circus style dancers and performers including fifteen children, champions from the Romanian Gymnastics Federation, plus characters from the Bucharest State Circus and an on-stage appearance by Mihai Trăistariu, dressed as Count Dracula and was followed by the traditional flag parade introducing the 15 participating countries. The interval act included a performance by last year's winner Ksenia Sitnik, a "fight" between street dance and traditional Romanian dance in addition to a remix of songs by the last three Romanian participants at the contest.

| R/O | Country | Artist | Song | Points | Place |
|---|---|---|---|---|---|
| 1 | Portugal | Pedro Madeira | "Deixa-me sentir" | 22 | 14 |
| 2 | Cyprus | Luis Panagiotou and Christina Christofi | "Agoria koritsia" | 58 | 8 |
| 3 | Netherlands | Kimberly Nieuwenhuis | "Goed" | 44 | 12 |
| 4 | Romania | New Star Music | "Povestea mea" | 80 | 6 |
| 5 | Ukraine | Nazar Slyusarchuk | "Khlopchyk Rock 'n' Roll" | 58 | 9 |
| 6 | Spain | Dani Fernández | "Te doy mi voz" | 90 | 4 |
| 7 | Serbia | Neustrašivi učitelji stranih jezika | "Učimo strane jezike" | 81 | 5 |
| 8 | Malta | Sophie Debattista | "Extra Cute" | 48 | 11 |
| 9 | Macedonia | Zana Aliu | "Vljubena" | 14 | 15 |
| 10 | Sweden | Molly Sandén | "Det finaste någon kan få" | 116 | 3 |
| 11 | Greece | Chloe Sofia Boleti | "Den peirazei" | 35 | 13 |
| 12 | Belarus | Andrey Kunets | "Noviy den" | 129 | 2 |
| 13 | Belgium | Thor! | "Een tocht door het donker" | 71 | 7 |
| 14 | Croatia | Mateo Đido | "Lea" | 50 | 10 |
| 15 | Russia | Tolmachevy Twins | "Vesenniy Jazz" | 154 | 1 |

=== Spokespersons ===
1. Portugal – Joana Galo Costa
2. Cyprus – George Ioannidies
3. Netherlands – Tess Gaerthe
4. Romania – Andrea Nastase
5. Ukraine – Assol
6. Spain – Lucía
7. Serbia – Milica Stanišić
8. Malta – Jack Curtis
9. Macedonia – Denis Dimoski
10. Sweden – Amy Deasismont
11. Greece – Alexandros Chountas
12. Belarus – Liza Anton-Baychuk
13. Belgium – Sander Cliquet
14. Croatia – Lorena Jelusić
15. Russia – Roman Kerimov

== Detailed voting results ==
Detailed voting results
| | | Total score | Portugal | Cyprus | Netherlands | Romania | Ukraine | Spain | Serbia | Malta | Macedonia | Sweden | Greece | Belarus | Belgium | Croatia | Russia |
|---|---|---|---|---|---|---|---|---|---|---|---|---|---|---|---|---|---|
| Contestants | Portugal | 22 | | | | | | 7 | | 3 | | | | | | | |
| Contestants | Cyprus | 58 | 3 | | 2 | 3 | 5 | 3 | | | 3 | 3 | 12 | 6 | | | 6 |
| Contestants | Netherlands | 44 | | | | | | | 5 | 8 | | 2 | | | 8 | 6 | 3 |
| Contestants | Romania | 80 | 6 | 8 | 1 | | 4 | 12 | 4 | 2 | 6 | 7 | 7 | 3 | 2 | 4 | 2 |
| Contestants | Ukraine | 58 | 5 | 2 | | 4 | | 6 | | 5 | | | 4 | 8 | 1 | 3 | 8 |
| Contestants | Spain | 90 | 7 | 5 | 7 | 8 | 6 | | 3 | 1 | 8 | 8 | 5 | 7 | 7 | 1 | 5 |
| Contestants | Serbia | 81 | 2 | 4 | 5 | 5 | 7 | 2 | | 7 | 10 | 4 | 1 | 5 | 5 | 5 | 7 |
| Contestants | Malta | 48 | 1 | 1 | 3 | | 1 | 1 | 1 | | 7 | 5 | 3 | 2 | 4 | 7 | |
| Contestants | Macedonia | 14 | | | | 2 | | | | | | | | | | | |
| Contestants | Sweden | 116 | 8 | 7 | 12 | 7 | 8 | 4 | 8 | 10 | 2 | | 6 | 10 | 10 | 2 | 10 |
| Contestants | Greece | 35 | | 12 | | 1 | | | 7 | | | | | | 3 | | |
| Contestants | Belarus | 129 | 12 | 6 | 4 | 10 | 10 | 8 | 6 | 12 | 5 | 10 | 8 | | 6 | 8 | 12 |
| Contestants | Belgium | 71 | 4 | 3 | 8 | 6 | 3 | 5 | 2 | 6 | 1 | 1 | 2 | 4 | | 10 | 4 |
| Contestants | Croatia | 50 | | | 6 | | 2 | | 10 | | 12 | 6 | | 1 | | | 1 |
| Contestants | Russia | 154 | 10 | 10 | 10 | 12 | 12 | 10 | 12 | 4 | 4 | 12 | 10 | 12 | 12 | 12 | |

=== 12 points ===
Below is a summary of all 12 points received. All countries were given 12 points at the start of voting to ensure that no country finished with nul points.

| N. | Contestant | Nation(s) giving 12 points |
|---|---|---|
| 7 | Russia | Belarus, Belgium, Croatia, Romania, Serbia, Sweden, Ukraine |
| 3 | Belarus | Malta, Portugal, Russia |
| 1 | Croatia | Macedonia |
| 1 | Cyprus | Greece |
| 1 | Greece | Cyprus |
| 1 | Romania | Spain |
| 1 | Sweden | Netherlands |

== Other countries ==
For a country to be eligible for potential participation in the Junior Eurovision Song Contest, it needs to be an active member of the EBU. It is currently unknown whether the EBU issue invitations of participation to all 56 active members like they do for the Eurovision Song Contest.

- Armenia – Armenian broadcaster AMPTV were negotiating with the EBU to debut. However, plans never came to fruition and they debuted a year later.
- Denmark – Danish broadcaster DR, along with all Scandinavian broadcasters (NRK and SVT), decided to withdraw from the contest for various reasons, one being that the content put too much pressure on the participating children. Instead they staged a solely Scandinavian contest called MGP Nordic in Stockholm, as they did in 2002.
- Latvia – Although the Latvian broadcaster LTV opened a submission window for their national final for the Junior Eurovision Song Contest, they later decided to withdraw from the contest due to financial reasons. They would return in 2010.
- Monaco – Monégasque broadcaster TMC, who is in charge of the country's participation in the Eurovision Song Contest, had stated an interest to take part in the contest. Monaco did not appear on the list of participants published by the EBU on 16 May 2006.
- Montenegro – Following the dissolution of Serbia and Montenegro, which had previously taken part in the 2005 contest, the EBU gave to the Montenegrin broadcaster, Radio Televizija Crne Gore (RTCG), extra time to decide whether or not to participate, but they finally declined the invitation. They would debut in 2014.
- Norway – Norwegian broadcaster NRK decided to withdraw from the contest for various reasons, one being to focus on participation in MGP Nordic.
- United Kingdom – British broadcaster ITV decided to withdraw from the contest due to low ratings in the last three editions. They would return in 2022.

== Broadcasts ==
Broadcasters and commentators in participating countries
| Country | Broadcaster(s) | Channel(s) | Commentator(s) | Ref. |
|---|---|---|---|---|
| Belarus | BTRC | Belarus 1, Belarus 24 | Denis Kurian | |
| Belgium | VRT | Eén | Ilse Van Hoecke and Jelle Cleymans | |
| Croatia | HRT | HRT 1 | Elan Nikk | |
| Cyprus | CyBC | RIK 1 | Kyriakos Pastides | |
| Greece | ERT | ET1 | Renia Tsitsibikou and George Amyras | |
| Macedonia | MRT | MTV 1 | Milanka Rašik | |
| Malta | PBS | TVM | Valerie Vella | |
| Netherlands | AVRO | Nederland 1 | Sipke Jan Bousema | |
| Portugal | RTP | RTP 1 | Isabel Angelino | |
| Romania | TVR | TVR1, TVRi | Ioana Isopecu and Alexandru Nagy | |
| Russia | RTR | Russia-1, RTR-Planeta | Olga Shelest | |
| Serbia | RTS | RTS2 | Duška Vučinić-Lučić | |
| Spain | TVE | TVE1, TVE Internacional | Fernando Argenta and Lucho | |
| Sweden | TV4 | | Adam Alsing | |
| Ukraine | NTU | Pershyi | Timur Miroshnychenko | |

Broadcasters and commentators in non-participating countries
| Country | Broadcaster(s) | Channel(s) | Commentator(s) | Ref. |
|---|---|---|---|---|
| Andorra | RTVA | ATV | Unknown | |
| Australia | SBS | SBS One (Note: Delayed broadcast on 1 January 2007 at 16:30) | No commentary | |
| Bosnia and Herzegovina | BHRT | BHT 1 | Unknown | |
| Israel | IBA | Channel 1 (Note: Delayed broadcast on 8 December 2007) | Unknown | |

== See also ==
- Eurovision Song Contest 2006
- Eurovision Young Musicians 2006
