= Greece in the Junior Eurovision Song Contest 2006 =

- Junior Eurovision Song Contest 2006
- Participating broadcaster: Hellenic Broadcasting Corporation (ERT)
- Country: Greece
- Selection process: I teliki epilogi tou ellinikou tragoudiou - Eurovision Junior-06
- Selection date: 7 October 2006

Competing entry
- Song: "Den peirazei"
- Artist: Chloe Sofia Boleti
- Songwriter: Chloe Sofia Boleti

Placement
- Final result: 13th, 35 points

Participation chronology

Greece was represented at the Junior Eurovision Song Contest 2006 with the song "Den peirazei", written and performed by Chloe Sofia Boleti. The Greek participating broadcaster, the Hellenic Broadcasting Corporation (ERT), selected its entry for the contest through a national final.

== Before Junior Eurovision ==
=== I teliki epilogi tou ellinikou tragoudiou - Eurovision Junior-06 ===
The Hellenic Broadcasting Corporation (ERT) opened the submission window the national final on 21 June 2006. The deadline for the submissions window was originally 28 July 2006 but was extended to 4 August 2006. By the deadline, 92 participants with 107 songs were received. From the entries, ten finalists were chosen by a jury consisting of Giorgos Polychroniou (chairman), Andreas Konstantinidis, Constantina, Dionysis Schoinas, Nina Lotsari and Stelios Fotiadis.

On 19 September 2006, the ten finalists were revealed. Originally Verina Evangelou was supposed to be a finalist with "Kati symnavei" but withdrew due to personal reasons, she got replaced by Maria Rigopoulou with "Kosmos onirikos". The running order was revealed on 26 September 2006.

The final took part on 7 October 2006 in ERT studio at 20:00 CEST and was broadcast on ET1. The show was hosted by Giorgos Amyras and Renia Tsitsibikou. The results were decided by a jury and televoting. The jury consisted of Giorgos Polychroniou (chairman), Andreas Konstantinidis, Dionysis Schoinas, Nina Lotsari, Stelios Fotiadis, Giorgos Mouchtaridis, Alexandros Chountas and Kalli Georgelli. (Note: Alexandros and Kalli's vote counted as one vote)

Guest performers were Dionysis Schinas and Dimitris Schoinas with "Eimai akoma paidi", Alexandros and Kalli with "Tora einai i seira mas", Nicolas Ganopoulos with "Fili gia panta", Giorgos Kotsougiannis and Antonis Skrivanos from Secret Band with "O palios mou eaftos" and Luis Panagiotou and Christina Christofi with "Agoria koritsia".

Key: Winner

Final – 7 October 2006
R/O	Artist	Song	Songwriter(s)
1	Stergios Pertsinidis	"Thelo na ziso" ("Θέλω να ζήσω")	Stergios Pertsinidis
2	Elpida Bairaktaridou	"Party" ("Πάρτυ")	Elpida Bairaktaridou
3	Maria Rigopoulou	"Kosmos onirikos" ("Κόσμος ονειρικός")	Maria Rigopoulou
4	Eirini Korchatzi, Eirini Tabakou and Sofia Achina	"Ena asteri" ("Ένα αστέρι")	Eirini Korchatzi; Eirini Tabakou; Sofia Achina
5	Maria Iliadou and Faidra Apalaki	"Zise ti zoi" ("Ζήσε τη ζωή")	Maria Iliadou; Faidra Apalaki
6	Caroline Tatara	"Onira glyka" ("Όνειρα γλυκά")	Caroline Tatara
7	Magdalini Papadopoulou and Sofia Kazantzidou	"Se thelo" ("Σε θέλω")	Magdalini Papadopoulou; Sofia Kazantzidou
8	Chloe Boleti	"Den peirazei" ("Δεν πειράζει")	Chloe Boleti
9	Theodora Katsikogianni and Pinelopi Skalkotou	"Mia agkalia gia ta paidia" ("Μια αγκαλιά για τα παιδιά")	Theodora Katsikogianni; Pinelopi Skalkotou
10	Eleni Grammatikopoulou	"To fos" ("Το φως")	Eleni Grammatikopoulou

== At Junior Eurovision ==
At the running order draw on 17 October 2006, Greece was drawn to perform eleventh on 2 December 2006, following Sweden and preceding Belarus.

=== Voting ===
Points awarded to Greece
Score	Country
12 points (Note: All countries received one set of 12 points to ensure no country finished with nul points.)	Cyprus
10 points	
8 points	
7 points	Serbia
6 points	
5 points	
4 points	
3 points	Belgium
2 points	
1 point	Romania

Points awarded by Greece
Score	Country
12 points	Cyprus
10 points	Russia
8 points	Belarus
7 points	Romania
6 points	Sweden
5 points	Spain
4 points	Ukraine
3 points	Malta
2 points	Belgium
1 point	Serbia
