= Croatia in the Junior Eurovision Song Contest 2006 =

- Junior Eurovision Song Contest 2006
- Participating broadcaster: Croatian Radiotelevision (HRT)
- Country: Croatia
- Selection process: 4. Izbor za Dječju Pjesmu Eurovizije
- Selection date: 2 July 2006

Competing entry
- Song: "Lea"
- Artist: Mateo Đido
- Songwriter: Mateo Đido

Placement
- Final result: 10th, 50 points

Participation chronology

Croatia was represented at the Junior Eurovision Song Contest 2006 with the song "Lea", written and performed by Mateo Đido. The Croatian participating broadcaster, Croatian Radiotelevision (HRT), selected its entry for the contest through a national final.

== Before Junior Eurovision ==
=== 4. Izbor za Dječju Pjesmu Eurovizije ===
From the 230 submissions, a jury selected ten songs to compete in the national final which were announced on 26 April 2006.

The final was held at 2 July 2006 in Zagreb at 17:30 CET and was broadcast on HRT 1. The hosts of the show were Iva Šulentić and Robert Bošković. The final results were chosen by a jury that consisted of Vanna, Ivica Kostelić, Boris Novković, Natalija Jurić, Mladen Kušeć, Željen Klašterka and Lorena Jelusić. Guests in the national final included Josipa Lisac, Nika Turković, Lorena Jelusić and Dino Jelusić.

Final – 2 July 2006
R/O	Artist	Song	Points	Place
1	Matilda Beriša	“Balerina”	688	4
2	Matej Miličić	“Nedodirljiva”	328	8
3	Nikolina Petrov	“Mobitel”	523	5
4	Iva Valentić	“Bilo je ljeto”	258	9
5	Mia Maltar	“Volim te”	738	3
6	Tijana Petak and Lara Erstić	“Želim biti zvijezda”	482	6
7	Kim Verson	“Mi sad pjevamo”	258	9
8	Mateo Ðido	“Lea”	1,301	1
9	Jelena Žnidarić	“Sve svoje pjesme poklanjam tebi”	1,073	2
10	Helena Novosel and Kristina Majpruz	“Moja ljubavi”	409	7

== At Junior Eurovision ==
At the running order draw on 17 October 2006, Croatia was drawn to perform fourteenth on 2 December 2006, following Belgium and preceding Russia.

=== Voting ===
Points awarded to Croatia
Score	Country
12 points (Note: All countries received one set of 12 points to ensure no country finished with nul points.)	Macedonia
10 points	Serbia
8 points	
7 points	
6 points	Netherlands Sweden
5 points	
4 points	
3 points	
2 points	Ukraine
1 point	Belarus Russia

Points awarded by Croatia
Score	Country
12 points	Russia
10 points	Belgium
8 points	Belarus
7 points	Malta
6 points	Netherlands
5 points	Serbia
4 points	Romania
3 points	Ukraine
2 points	Sweden
1 point	Spain
