= Sweden in the Junior Eurovision Song Contest 2006 =

- Junior Eurovision Song Contest 2006
- Country: Sweden
- Selection process: Stage Junior 2006
- Selection date: 2 September 2006

Competing entry
- Song: "Det finaste någon kan få"
- Artist: Molly Sandén

Placement
- Final result: 3rd, 116 points

Participation chronology

Sweden was represented at the Junior Eurovision Song Contest 2006 by Molly Sandén with "Det finaste någon kan få". TV4 took over participation after Sveriges Television (SVT) withdrew after 2005.

After the 2005 Contest, SVT decided to withdraw from Junior Eurovision to participate in the revived Scandinavian contest MGP Nordic, previously held in 2002. TV4 decided to continue Sweden's participation in Junior Eurovision, remaining the only Nordic country left in the contest.

== Before Junior Eurovision ==
=== Stage Junior 2006 ===
TV4 decided to hold a national final to select the Swedish entry for the 2006 Junior Eurovision Song Contest. The show was held on 2 September at Globen in Stockholm, hosted by Agneta Sjödin and Adam Alsing. Televoting selected the winner from the 8 competing songs. Only the top three songs were announced, with Molly Sandén winning the contest as the favourite, receiving 35% of the votes for her performance of "Det finaste någon kan få".

Final – 2 September 2006
Draw	Artist	Song	Televote	Place
1	Sanna Johansson	"Jorden runt"	—	—
2	Sally Johansson-Frisell	"Nu vet jag bättre"	—	—
3	Sebastian Krantz	"Ta tag i situationen"	—	—
4	Bianca Wahlgren-Ingrosso & Malin Eriksson	"Kan det bli vi två"	16%	2
5	George Shaid	"Jag tror jag är kär"	—	—
6	Nadja Juslin	"Tusen rosor"	—	—
7	Karin Aldheimer & Viktor Abrahamsson	"Svartvitt"	12%	3
8	Molly Sandén	"Det finaste någon kan få"	35%	1

== At Junior Eurovision ==
On the night of the contest, held in Bucharest, Romania, Molly Sandén performed 10th in the running order of the contest, following Macedonia and preceding Greece. At the close of the voting Molly received 116 points, placing 3rd of the 15 competing entries, giving Sweden its best result at Junior Eurovision ever.

=== Voting ===
Points awarded to Sweden
Score	Country
12 points (Note: All countries received one set of 12 points to ensure no country finished with nul points.)	Netherlands
10 points	Belarus; Belgium; Malta; Russia
8 points	Portugal; Serbia; Ukraine
7 points	Cyprus; Romania
6 points	Greece
5 points	
4 points	Spain
3 points	
2 points	Croatia; Macedonia
1 point	

Points awarded by Sweden
Score	Country
12 points	Russia
10 points	Belarus
8 points	Spain
7 points	Romania
6 points	Croatia
5 points	Malta
4 points	Serbia
3 points	Cyprus
2 points	Netherlands
1 point	Belgium
