= Romania in the Junior Eurovision Song Contest 2006 =

- Junior Eurovision Song Contest 2006
- Participating broadcaster: Televiziunea Română (TVR)
- Country: Romania
- Selection process: Selecţia Naţională Eurovision Junior 2006
- Selection date: 1 June 2006

Competing entry
- Song: "Povestea mea"
- Artist: New Star Music
- Songwriter: New Star Music

Placement
- Final result: 6th, 80 points

Participation chronology

Romania was represented at the Junior Eurovision Song Contest 2006 with the song "Povestea mea", written and performed by New Star Music. The Romanian participating broadcaster, Televiziunea Română (TVR), selected its entry for the contest with the national final Selecţia Naţională Eurovision Junior 2006, held on 1 June 2006. In addition, TVR was also the host broadcaster and staged the event at Sala Polivalentă in Bucharest.

== Before Junior Eurovision ==
=== Selecţia Naţională Eurovision Junior 2006 ===
Televiziunea Română (TVR) received a total of 45 entries, in which 21 were chosen for the national final.

The final took place on 1 June 2006. 21 songs took part and the winner was determined by a 50/50 combination of votes from a jury panel and a public televote. The winner was "Povestea mea" performed by New Star Music, receiving the maximum points from the televoters and second most points from the jury.

Final – 1 June 2006
R/O	Artist	Song	Jury	Televote	Total	Place
1	Zig Zag	"Cantec pentru Eurovision Junior"	76	70	146	2
2	Julie Stanciu	"Las’, Las’, Las"	24	42	66	4
3	Perfect	"Un duet perfect"	12	0	12	14
4	Patricia Matei	"Cand ma joc"	32	0	32	8
5	Trupa Dinamic	"E sarbatoare"	14	0	14	13
6	A+	"Vara"	24	0	24	10
7	Andrei Loica	"Imi place gluma"	33	0	33	7
8	New Star Music	"Povestea mea"	75	84	159	1
9	Diana Caldararu	"Copilarie"	5	14	19	12
10	Ovidiu Lazar & Iulia Tohotan	"Daca am putea"	18	56	47	6
11	Bogdan Bidasca	"O masina"	4	0	4	18
12	Andreea Trandafir	"Printesa cocheta"	8	0	8	17
13	Ana Baniciu	"N-asteptati sa vina fata"	9	49	58	5
14	Monique Dinescu	"Mereu copii"	11	0	11	15
15	Alexandra Mateiuc	"Iubesc muzica"	2	21	23	11
16	Ana-Maria Pacararu	"Vacanta"	0	0	0	19
17	Lavinia Ionija	"Caruselul"	0	0	0	20
18	Oriana Istrate	"Petrecerea mea"	4	28	32	9
19	Marian Stancu	"Romeo si Julieta"	54	35	89	3
20	Karina Ghita	"Sa ating o stea"	1	7	8	16
21	Laetitia Ciocoiu	"Asta e sansa mea"	0	0	0	21

== At Eurovision ==
=== Voting ===
Points awarded to Romania
Score	Country
12 points (Note: All countries received one set of 12 points to ensure no country finished with nul points.)	Spain
10 points	
8 points	Cyprus
7 points	Greece; Sweden
6 points	Macedonia; Portugal
5 points	
4 points	Croatia; Serbia; Ukraine
3 points	Belarus
2 points	Belgium; Malta; Russia
1 point	Netherlands

Points awarded by Romania
Score	Country
12 points	Russia
10 points	Belarus
8 points	Spain
7 points	Sweden
6 points	Belgium
5 points	Serbia
4 points	Ukraine
3 points	Cyprus
2 points	Macedonia
1 point	Greece
