= Salden =

Salden may refer to:

- Salden, Buckinghamshire, seat of John Fortescue of Salden, the third Chancellor of the Exchequer of England

== People with the surname ==
- Thor Salden, the winning contestant in the Belgian pre-selections of the Junior Eurovision Song Contest 2006
