= Netherlands in the Junior Eurovision Song Contest 2006 =

- Junior Eurovision Song Contest 2006
- Participating broadcaster: Algemene Vereniging Radio Omroep (AVRO)
- Country: Netherlands
- Selection process: Junior Songfestival 2006
- Selection date: 30 September 2006

Competing entry
- Song: "Goed"
- Artist: Kimberly Nieuwenhuis
- Songwriter: Kimberly Nieuwenhuis

Placement
- Final result: 12th, 44 points

Participation chronology

The Netherlands was represented at the Junior Eurovision Song Contest 2006 with the song "Goed", written and performed by Kimberly Nieuwenhuis. The Dutch participating broadcaster, Algemene Vereniging Radio Omroep (AVRO), selected its entry for the contest through a national selection called Junior Songfestival 2006.

== Before Junior Eurovision ==
=== Junior Songfestival 2006 ===
Algemene Vereniging Radio Omroep (AVRO) opened the submission window for Junior Songfestival 2006 on 3 March 2006 and closed it on 12 May 2006. By the deadline, 1500 submissions were received. Out of the submissions, 45 acts were selected for the auditions. From the auditions, twelve acts got through to the workshops.

==== Workshops ====
In the workshops in Amsterdam, the participants worked on vocals, dancing and performing in Junior Songfestival 2006. The twelve acts participating in the workshops were revealed on 5 June 2006. From the twelve acts in the workshops, six finalists were chosen which were announced on 12 June 2006. (Note: Originally was supposed to be five finalists)

Qualified

The twelve remaining acts in Workshops
| Artist | Song | Result |
|---|---|---|
| Chamayre | "Dans maar" | —N/a |
| Coen | "Ik wil mezelf zijn" | Qualified |
| Jermaine | "Vrije tijd" | —N/a |
| Jordan and Eddy | "Voetbal" | —N/a |
| Kimberly | "Goed" | Qualified |
| Marie-Louise | "Dansen" | —N/a |
| Nigel | "Radar" | Qualified |
| Noël | "Geen kinderliedjes" | Qualified |
| Noortje and Ylva | "Alles is oké | Qualified |
| Savanna | "Hele leuke knul" | —N/a |
| Sherefa | "Hé, hé, hé" | Qualified |
| Salóme | "Ik droom, ik zweef" | —N/a |

==== Final ====
The final took place on 30 September 2006 at 19:00 CEST in Studio 24 at Hilversum and was broadcast on Nederland 3. The show was hosted by Sipke Jan Bousema. The interval act was the participants performing the common song "Vrij". The results were decied by 1/3 kids jury, 1/3 adult jury and 1/3 televoting. The adult jury consisted of Gerard Ekdom, Simone Kleinsma and Sita.

Final – 30 September 2006
| R/O | Artist | Song | Kids jury | Adult jury | Televoting | Total | Place |
|---|---|---|---|---|---|---|---|
| 1 | Noël | "Geen kinderliedjes" | 5 | 12 | 6 | 23 | 3 |
| 2 | Nigel | "Radar" | 8 | 5 | 10 | 23 | 4 |
| 3 | Noortje and Ylva | "Alles is oké" | 6 | 4 | 5 | 15 | 6 |
| 4 | Coen | "Ik wil mezelf zijn" | 4 | 8 | 4 | 16 | 5 |
| 5 | Kimberly | "Goed" | 12 | 10 | 8 | 30 | 1 |
| 6 | Sherefa | "Hé, hé, hé" | 10 | 6 | 12 | 28 | 2 |

== At Junior Eurovision ==
At the running order draw on 17 October 2006, the Netherlands was drawn to perform third on 2 December 2006, following Cyprus and preceding Romania.

=== Voting ===
Points awarded to Netherlands
| Score | Country |
|---|---|
| 12 points (Note: All countries received one set of 12 points to ensure no country finished with nul points.) | |
| 10 points | |
| 8 points | Belgium; Malta |
| 7 points | |
| 6 points | Croatia |
| 5 points | Serbia |
| 4 points | |
| 3 points | Russia |
| 2 points | Sweden |
| 1 point | |

Points awarded by Netherlands
| Score | Country |
|---|---|
| 12 points | Sweden |
| 10 points | Russia |
| 8 points | Belgium |
| 7 points | Spain |
| 6 points | Croatia |
| 5 points | Serbia |
| 4 points | Belarus |
| 3 points | Malta |
| 2 points | Cyprus |
| 1 point | Romania |
