= Malta in the Junior Eurovision Song Contest 2006 =

- Junior Eurovision Song Contest 2006
- Participating broadcaster: Public Broadcasting Services (PBS)
- Country: Malta
- Selection process: Junior Song for Europe 2006
- Selection date: 15 September 2006

Competing entry
- Song: "Extra Cute"
- Artist: Sophie Debattista
- Songwriter: Sophie Debattista

Placement
- Final result: 11th, 48 points

Participation chronology

Malta was represented at the Junior Eurovision Song Contest 2006 with the song "Extra Cute", written and performed by Sophie Debattista. The Maltese participating broadcaster, Public Broadcasting Services (PBS), selected its entry for the contest through Junior Song for Europe 2006.

== Before Junior Eurovision ==
=== Junior Song for Europe 2006 ===
The Public Broadcasting Services (PBS) opened the submission window for Junior Song for Europe 2006 on 14 July 2006 and closed it on 17 August 2006. By the deadline, 114 entries were received which 51 of them were chosen by a jury for the semi-finals. The song titles of the semi-finalists were revealed 21 August 2006

==== Semi-Finals ====
The semi-finals were held on 26 August 2006 in Golden Tulip Vivaldi Hotel in St. Julian's. From the entries, 14 finalists were chosen which were revealed on 28 August 2006 along with the running order.

Selected for the final

Semi-Finals - 26 August 2006
Song	Result
"A Rainbow of Love"	—N/a
"All You People Out There"	—N/a
"Angel Eyes"	—N/a
"Be Strong"	—N/a
"Believe in Yourself"	—N/a
"Dancing in the Street"	—N/a
"Dedication"	Qualified
"Dreaming of a Miracle"	—N/a
"Enjoy the Better Things"	Qualified
"Everywhere I Go"	Qualified
"Extra Cute"	Qualified
"Find Her Way"	—N/a
"Fly, Sing and Dance"	—N/a
"Find the Rhythm"	—N/a
"I Dream Awake"	—N/a
"If We Believe"	—N/a
"I'll Be On My Way"	—N/a
"In My Heart"	—N/a
"Just a Kid!"	—N/a
"Let's Play"	—N/a
"Life"	—N/a
"Make a Wish"	—N/a
"Music for You and Me"	Qualified
"Music is My Life"	—N/a
"Musical Rain"	—N/a
"My Angel and Friend"	—N/a
"My Life"	Qualified
"My Love"	Qualified
"Nature Calls"	—N/a
"New Generation"	—N/a
"No Expiry Date"	—N/a
"Play Your Violin"	Qualified
"Pretty in Pink"	—N/a
"Rhythm"	—N/a
"Save Rock 'n' Roll"	Qualified
"Sign in the Stars"	—N/a
"Smile Again"	Qualified
"Step by Step"	—N/a
"Stop Telling Me!"	Qualified
"Summer Summer"	—N/a
"Superstar"	—N/a
"Teenage Dreams"	—N/a
"Tell Me Now"	—N/a
"The Key"	Qualified
"Turn on the Radio"	Qualified
"Warning!"	—N/a
"Why?"	—N/a
"Wishes"	Qualified
"You Can Fly"	—N/a
"You Tell Me!"	—N/a
"Your Love"	—N/a

==== Final ====
The final was originally supposed to be held on 16 September 2006 in Sir Temi Zammit Hall in the University of Malta but was moved to a day earlier and the venue was also changed.

The final was held on 15 September 2006 in the ruins of the Royal Opera House in Valletta at 20:30 CEST and was broadcast on TVM. The show was hosted by Andre and Claire. The results were decided by 80% jury and 20% televoting. Guest performers included Bridget Gauci Borda Dancers, College of Jazz, Paul Curmi Dancers, Thea and Friends and the William Dance Centre.

Final – 15 September 2006
R/O	Artist	Song	Points	Place
1	Ishmael Grech	"My Life"	50	4
2	Maria and Ritianne Galdes	"Enjoy the Better Things"	13	13
3	Kylie Coleiro	"Everywhere I Go"	67	3
4	Domenique Azzopardi	"The Key"	38	7
5	Danica Muscat	"Play Your Violin"	36	8
6	Ehren French	"Smile Again"	8	14
7	Kristie	"Music for You and Me"	18	11
8	She2s	"Wishes"	28	10
9	Francesca Zarb	"Dedication"	39	6
10	Christine Haber	"My Love"	40	5
11	Sophie Debattista	"Extra Cute"	99	1
12	Vanessa Gatt	"Turn on the Radio"	31	9
13	Louanne Carauna	"Stop Telling Me!"	16	12
14	Guess Who	"Save Rock 'n' Roll"	97	2

== At Junior Eurovision ==
At the running order draw on 17 October 2006, Malta was drawn to perform eighth on 2 December 2006, following Serbia and preceding Macedonia.

=== Voting ===
Points awarded to Malta
Score	Country
12 points (Note: All countries received one set of 12 points to ensure no country finished with nul points.)	
10 points	
8 points	
7 points	Croatia; Macedonia
6 points	
5 points	Sweden
4 points	Belgium
3 points	Greece; Netherlands
2 points	Belarus
1 point	Cyprus; Portugal; Serbia; Spain; Ukraine

Points awarded by Malta
Score	Country
12 points	Belarus
10 points	Sweden
8 points	Netherlands
7 points	Serbia
6 points	Belgium
5 points	Ukraine
4 points	Russia
3 points	Portugal
2 points	Romania
1 point	Spain
