= Cyprus in the Junior Eurovision Song Contest 2006 =

- Junior Eurovision Song Contest 2006
- Participating broadcaster: Cyprus Broadcasting Corporation (CyBC)
- Country: Cyprus
- Selection process: National final
- Selection date: 30 September 2006

Competing entry
- Song: "Agoria koritsia"
- Artist: Luis Panagiotou and Christina Christofi
- Songwriters: Christina Christofi; Luis Panagiotou

Placement
- Final result: 8th, 58 points

Participation chronology

Cyprus was represented at the Junior Eurovision Song Contest 2006 with the song "Agoria koritsia", written and performed by Luis Panagiotou and Christina Christofi. The Cypriot participating broadcaster, the Cyprus Broadcasting Corporation (CyBC), selected its entry for the contest through a national final.

== Before Junior Eurovision ==
=== National final ===
Cyprus Broadcasting Corporation (CyBC) opened the submission window for the national final from 27 June 2006 until 18 August 2006. the submission window, 28 submissions were received.

The first phase of the selection was held on 5 September 2006 in CyBC Studios. From there, an eight-member jury chose 9 finalists. The day after, the finalists of the national final were announced. Christina Zante with the song “Apaitoume irini” was also originally one of the participants but was disqualified due to having professional music and modelling activities, making the national final have 8 participants. The running order was announced on 25 September 2006.

The final was held on 30 September 2006 with it being broadcast on RIK 1 and RIK Sat. The final was hosted by Christina Marouchou. The results were decided by 40% jury and 60% televoting. With there being a tie in first place with 90 points, Luis Panagiotou and Christina Christofi won due to having more points from the televoting. The national final also had a common song.

Final – 30 September 2006
R/O	Artist	Song	Points	Place
1	Christina Averkiou and Michalis Schinas	"Kainouria onira, kainouria archi" ("Καινούρια όνειρα, καινούρια αρχή")	80	3
2	Georgia Konstantinou	"Rozali" ("Ροζαλη")	20	8
3	Sotiris Charalambous	"Proseuchi" ("Προσευχή")	90	2
4	Christodoula Tsagkara	"Mia star" ("Μια σταρ")	46	5
5	Luis Panagiotou and Christina Christofi	"Agoria koritsia" ("Αγόρια κορίτσια")	90	1
6	Anna Loizou and Raphael Georgiou	"Fos" ("Φως")	62	4
7	Niki Alexandrou	"Stin ankalia tis mousikis" ("Στην αγκαλιά της μουσικής")	36	7
8	Georgios Ioannidis, Michalis Stelmachiuk, Charis Savva, Maria Moskofian and Elena Mannouri	"Filoi gia panta" ("Φίλοι για πάντα")	46	6

== At Junior Eurovision ==
At the running order draw on 17 October 2006, Cyprus was drawn to perform second on 2 December 2006, following Portugal and preceding the Netherlands.

=== Voting ===
Points awarded to Cyprus
Score	Country
12 points (Note: All countries received one set of 12 points to ensure no country finished with nul points.)	Greece
10 points	
8 points	
7 points	
6 points	Belarus; Russia
5 points	Ukraine
4 points	
3 points	Macedonia; Portugal; Romania; Spain; Sweden
2 points	Netherlands
1 point	

Points awarded by Cyprus
Score	Country
12 points	Greece
10 points	Russia
8 points	Romania
7 points	Sweden
6 points	Belarus
5 points	Spain
4 points	Serbia
3 points	Belgium
2 points	Ukraine
1 point	Malta
