= Areas imperialis =

Scientific classification
- Kingdom: Animalia
- Phylum: Arthropoda
- Class: Insecta
- Order: Lepidoptera
- Superfamily: Noctuoidea
- Family: Erebidae
- Subfamily: Arctiinae
- Genus: Areas
- Species: A. imperialis

Binomial name
- Areas imperialis (Kollar, [1844])

Synonyms
- Euprepia imperialis Kollar, [1844]; Areas (Melanareas) imperialis

Species of moth

Areas imperialis is a moth of the family Erebidae. It was described by Vincenz Kollar in 1844. It is found in Tibet, the north-western Himalayas, Sikkim and Nepal.
