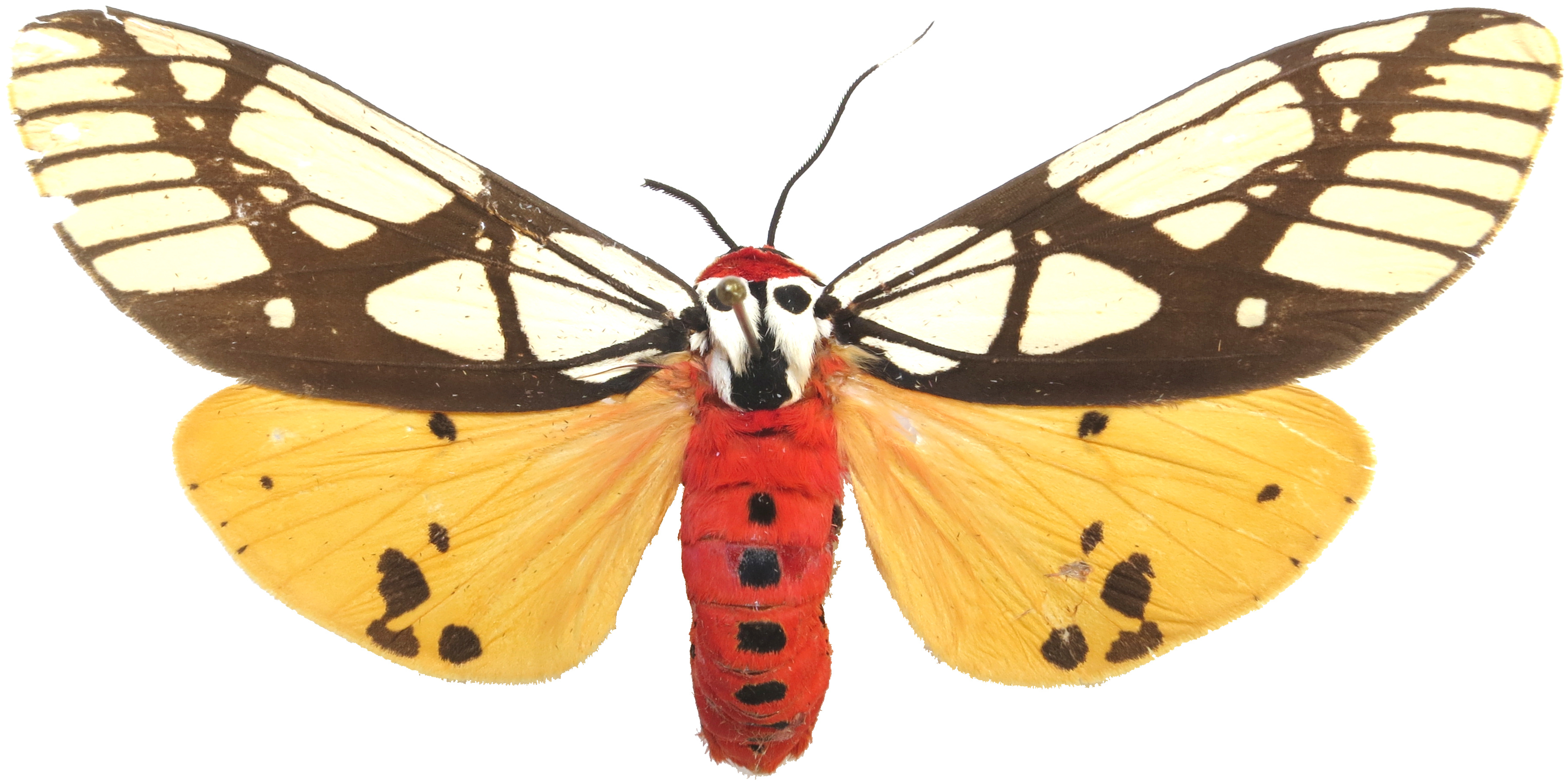
- Areas galactina - Kon Tum Province, Vietnam

Scientific classification
- Kingdom: Animalia
- Phylum: Arthropoda
- Class: Insecta
- Order: Lepidoptera
- Superfamily: Noctuoidea
- Family: Erebidae
- Subfamily: Arctiinae
- Genus: Areas
- Species: A. galactina

Binomial name
- Areas galactina (Hoeven, 1840)

Synonyms
- Chelonia galactina Hoeven, 1840; Pericallia galactina f. walshiae Roepke, 1938; Pericallia galactina latifascia Rothschild, 1933; Pericallia galactina ochracea; Areas orientalis Walker, 1855; Pericallia galactina ab. khasiana Rothschild, 1914; Numenes trigonalis Snellen van Vollenhoven, 1863; Areas cana Druce, 1899; Pericallia galactina intermedia Rothschild, 1933; Areas galactina intermedia Rothschild, 1933

= Areas galactina =

Species of moth

Areas galactina is a moth of the family Erebidae. It was described by Jan van der Hoeven in 1840. It is found in China (Sichuan, Hunan, Guangdong, Guangxi, Yunnan, Hubei), Taiwan, the north-western Himalayas, India (Sikkim, Assam, Andamans), Nepal, Bhutan, Bangladesh, Indochina, the Philippines, Indonesia and Sundaland.

The length of the forewings is 32–35 mm for males and 40–42 mm for females.

== Subspecies ==
- Areas galactina galactina
- Areas galactina formosana Okano, 1960 (Taiwan)
- Areas galactina hollowayi Dubatolov, Haynes & Kishida, 2009 (Malaysia: Sabah)
- Areas galactina inouei Dubatolov, Haynes & Kishida, 2009 (Vietnam)
- Areas galactina khasiana Daniel, 1943
- Areas galactina latifascia (Rothschild, 1933) (Andamans)
- Areas galactina ochracea Mell, 1922 (China: Sichuan, Hunan, Guangdong, Guangxi, Yunnan, Hubei)
- Areas galactina orientalis (Walker, 1855) (Assam, Sikkim, Himachal Pradesh, Nepal, Bhutan, Bangladesh)
- Areas galactina owadai Dubatolov, Haynes & Kishida, 2009 (Philippines: Palawan, Luzon, Mindoro, Panay, Leyte, Negros)
- Areas galactina trigonalis (Snellen van Vollenhoven, 1863) (Malacca, Sumatra, Borneo)
