= Antes muerta que sencilla =

2004 song by María Isabel

Single by María Isabel

from the album ¡No me toques las palmas que me conozco!
- Language: Spanish
- Released: 2004
- Label: Universal Music Group
- Songwriter: María Isabel

María Isabel singles chronology
"Antes muerta que sencilla" (2004)	"¡No me toques las palmas que me conozco!" (2004)

Music video
- "Antes muerta que sencilla" on YouTube

Junior Eurovision Song Contest 2004 entry
- Country: Spain
- Artist: María Isabel
- Language: Spanish
- Composer: María Isabel
- Lyricist: María Isabel

Finals performance
- Final result: 1st
- Final points: 171

Entry chronology
- ◄ "Desde el cielo" (2003)
- "Te traigo flores" (2005) ►

Official performance video
- "Antes muerta que sencilla" on YouTube

"Antes muerta que sencilla" (English: "I'd rather be dead than plain") is a song written by Spanish singer María Isabel in 2004, when she was nine years old. It represented Spain in the Junior Eurovision Song Contest 2004, winning the competition with a then record total of 171 points. It became a huge hit in Spain, Latin America, Japan, and it was also a top ten hit in France, and a top twenty in Switzerland. It was the first single of her first album ¡No me toques las palmas que me conozco! released on 2 November 2004.

A cover version titled "Antes muertas que sencillas" was recorded by Regional Mexican band Los Horóscopos de Durango and became popular among the Duranguense scene, gaining huge success in the United States and Mexico. The same title was used for their 2006 album.

== Background ==
=== National selection ===
Between 7 and 21 September 2004, "Antes muerta que sencilla" performed by María Isabel competed in Eurojunior 2004, the national selection organised by Televisión Española (TVE) to select its song and performer for the 2nd edition of the Junior Eurovision Song Contest. The song won the competition becoming the Spanish entrant, and María Isabel the performer, for Junior Eurovision. On 2 November 2004, she released her first album ¡No me toques las palmas que me conozco! of which "Antes muerta que sencilla" was the first single.

=== Junior Eurovision ===
On 20 November 2004, the Junior Eurovision Song Contest was held at the Håkons Hall in Lillehammer hosted by the Norwegian Broadcasting Corporation (NRK), and broadcast live throughout the continent. María Isabel performed "Antes muerta que sencilla" fifteenth on the evening. At the close of voting, the song had received 171 points, winning the competition.

=== Aftermath ===
On 26 November 2005, the 3rd edition of the Junior Eurovision Song Contest was held at the Ethias Arena in Hasselt hosted by Radio Télévision Belge Francophone (RTBF) and Vlaamse Radio- en Televisieomroep (VRT). María Isabel performed a medley of "Antes muerta que sencilla" and her new single "Pues va a ser que no" from her second album Número 2 as part of the interval act. She also presented the prize to the winner of the competition.

On 20 November 2010, the 8th edition of the Junior Eurovision Song Contest was held at the Minsk-Arena in Minsk hosted by the Belarusian Television and Radio Company (BTRC). María Isabel performed "Antes muerta que sencilla" in a medley with all the previous winners of the contest as part of the interval act. They also presented the trophy to the new winner at the end of the show. On 11 December 2022, the song was also performed at the 20th edition's interval act as part of the 20th anniversary winners medley, in this case by the Tavush Diocese Children’s Choir.

== Charts ==
"Antes muerta que sencilla" became a huge hit in Spain, Latin America, Japan, and it was also a top ten hit in France, and a top twenty in Switzerland.

=== Weekly charts ===
Chart (2004)	Peak position
Belgium (Wallonia Singles Chart)	36
France (SNEP Singles Chart)	6
Germany (German Singles Chart)	89
Italy (FIMI)	34
Switzerland (Swiss Singles Chart)	18

== Legacy ==
=== Los Horóscopos de Durango cover ===
A cover version titled "Antes muertas que sencillas" was recorded by Regional Mexican band Los Horóscopos de Durango and became popular among the Duranguense scene, gaining huge success in the United States and Mexico. The same title was used for their 2006 album.
