= Russia in the Junior Eurovision Song Contest 2006 =

- Junior Eurovision Song Contest 2006
- Country: Russia
- Selection process: National final
- Selection date: 4 June 2006

Competing entry
- Song: "Vesenniy Jazz"
- Artist: Tolmachevy Twins

Placement
- Final result: 1st, 154 points

Participation chronology

Russia was represented at the Junior Eurovision Song Contest 2006 in Bucharest, Romania. The Russian entry was selected through a national final, organised by Russian broadcaster All-Russia State Television and Radio Company (VGTRK). The final was held on 4 June 2006. Tolmachevy Twins and their song "Vesenniy Jazz" won the national final.

== Before Junior Eurovision ==
=== National final ===
On 5 April 2006, VGTRK announced that a national final would be held to select Russia' entry for the Junior Eurovision Song Contest 2006. A submission period for interested artists was opened and lasted until 27 April 2006. A professional jury selected twenty artists and songs from the applicants to proceed to the televised national final. The selected artists and songs competed at the national final which took place on 4 June 2006 in Moscow, hosted by Valeriya and Yuri Nikolaev. The winner was determined exclusively by public televoting. The members of the backup jury were Grigory Gladkov, Evgeny Krylatov, Alexander Zhurbin, Nadezhda Babkina and Philipp Kirkorov. In addition to the performances from the competitors, the show featured guest performances by Kseniya Sitnik, Vladislav Krutskikh and Volshebniki Dvora.

Final – 4 June 2006
Draw	Artist	Song	Place
1	Tolmachevy Twins	"Vesenniy Jazz"	1
2	Roma Kerimov	"Khudozhnik"	15
3	Tanya Khramova	"Parovoz"	18
4	Luara Hayrapetyan	"Krasnaya Shapochka"	2
5	Nastya Obraztsova	"Durnushka"	20
6	Zhenya Netsvetov	"Moya Rossiya"	5
7	Ksyusha Milyukova	"Ya i solnishko"	19
8	Merab Darsaniya	"Maestro Robertino"	4
9	Sasha Kozlova	"Vmeste s nami"	6
10	Alina Shaygorodskaya	"Puteshestvenniki"	17
11	Aleksandr Zinovyev	"Robinzon"	11
12	Narek Vardanyan	"Podruga balalayka"	3
13	Rita Mochalova	"Ya proshu vas, lyudi, byt dobree"	16
14	Volodya Safonkin	"Moya lyubov"	7
15	Slava Akimov	"Mobilniy telefon"	9
16	Katya Savelieva	"Ya tantsuyu"	14
17	Kirill Kirilenko	"Sobaka Nayda"	12
18	Ulyana Sinetskaya	"Feya"	13
19	Band "Patsany"	"Neverland"	8
20	Polina Ushakova	"Russkie matreshki"	10

== At Junior Eurovision ==
During the allocation draw on 17 October 2006, Russia was drawn to perform last, 15th, following Croatia. Russia placed 1st, scoring 154 points and winning the contest.

Tolmachevy Sisters were joined on stage by four boys from the ballet troupe.

In Russia, show were broadcast on Russia-1 with commentary by Olga Shelest. The Russian spokesperson revealing the result of the Russian vote was Roman Kerimov.

=== Voting ===
Points awarded to Russia
Score	Country
12 points (Note: All countries received one set of 12 points to ensure no country finished with nul points.)	Belarus; Belgium; Croatia; Romania; Serbia; Sweden; Ukraine
10 points	Cyprus; Greece; Netherlands; Portugal; Spain
8 points	
7 points	
6 points	
5 points	
4 points	Macedonia; Malta
3 points	
2 points	
1 point	

Points awarded by Russia
Score	Country
12 points	Belarus
10 points	Sweden
8 points	Ukraine
7 points	Serbia
6 points	Cyprus
5 points	Spain
4 points	Belgium
3 points	Netherlands
2 points	Romania
1 point	Croatia
