= Capricornio (album) =

Studio album by María Isabel
- Released: November 21, 2006 (Spain)
- Recorded: 2006
- Genre: Latin
- Label: Spain: Vale Music

María Isabel chronology
Número 2 (2005)	Capricornio (2006)	Ángeles S.A. (2007)

Capricornio is María Isabel's third album and was released in 2006.

== Track listing ==
1. "De Qué Vas"
2. "Súper Guay"
3. "Vampira"
4. "Washisnein"
5. "Cometas De Cristal"
6. "Mejor Sola Que Mal Acompañada"
7. "Comba María"
8. "Fantástica"
9. "La Maleta Del Abuelo"
10. "En Mi Escalera"
11. "Yo Soy Del Sur"
12. "Sumar"
13. "Toma Que Dale"
14. "Comme CI Comme Ça"
15. "Tómbola" (Duet with Marisol)

== Singles ==
"De Qué Vas"
