= Areal =

Areal can refer to:

- An adjective pertaining to an area
- Areal, Rio de Janeiro, a municipality in Brazil
- Areal Technology, a defunct hard disk drive manufacturer
- António Areal (1934—1978), Portuguese painter
- Sofia Areal (born 1960), Portuguese painter, António Areal's daughter

== See also ==
- Area (disambiguation)
- Areal density (computer storage)
- Areal feature in linguistics
- Areal velocity, a term from classical mechanics
- Areal, a scrapped video game
