= ¡No me toques las palmas que me conozco! =

Studio album by María Isabel
- Released: November 2, 2004 (Spain)
- Recorded: 2004
- Genre: R&B, Latin, Rap
- Label: Spain: Vale Music

María Isabel chronology
¡No me toques las palmas que me conozco! (2004)	Número 2 (2005)

Alternative covers
- Special Edition w/ DVD cover

¡No me toques las palmas que me conozco! is María Isabel's first album, released in 2004.

== Track listing ==
1. "Antes muerta que sencilla"
2. "La vida es bella"
3. "Un muchacho"
4. "¡No me toques las palmas que me conozco!
5. "Mi limusín"
6. "La noche y tu voz"
7. "Escalofrío"
8. "La Pepa"
9. "¿Onde vas Marisabel?"
10. "Mira niño"
