= Tolmachevy Sisters =

Russian identical twin singers (born 1997)

The Tolmachevy Sisters Сёстры Толмачёвы
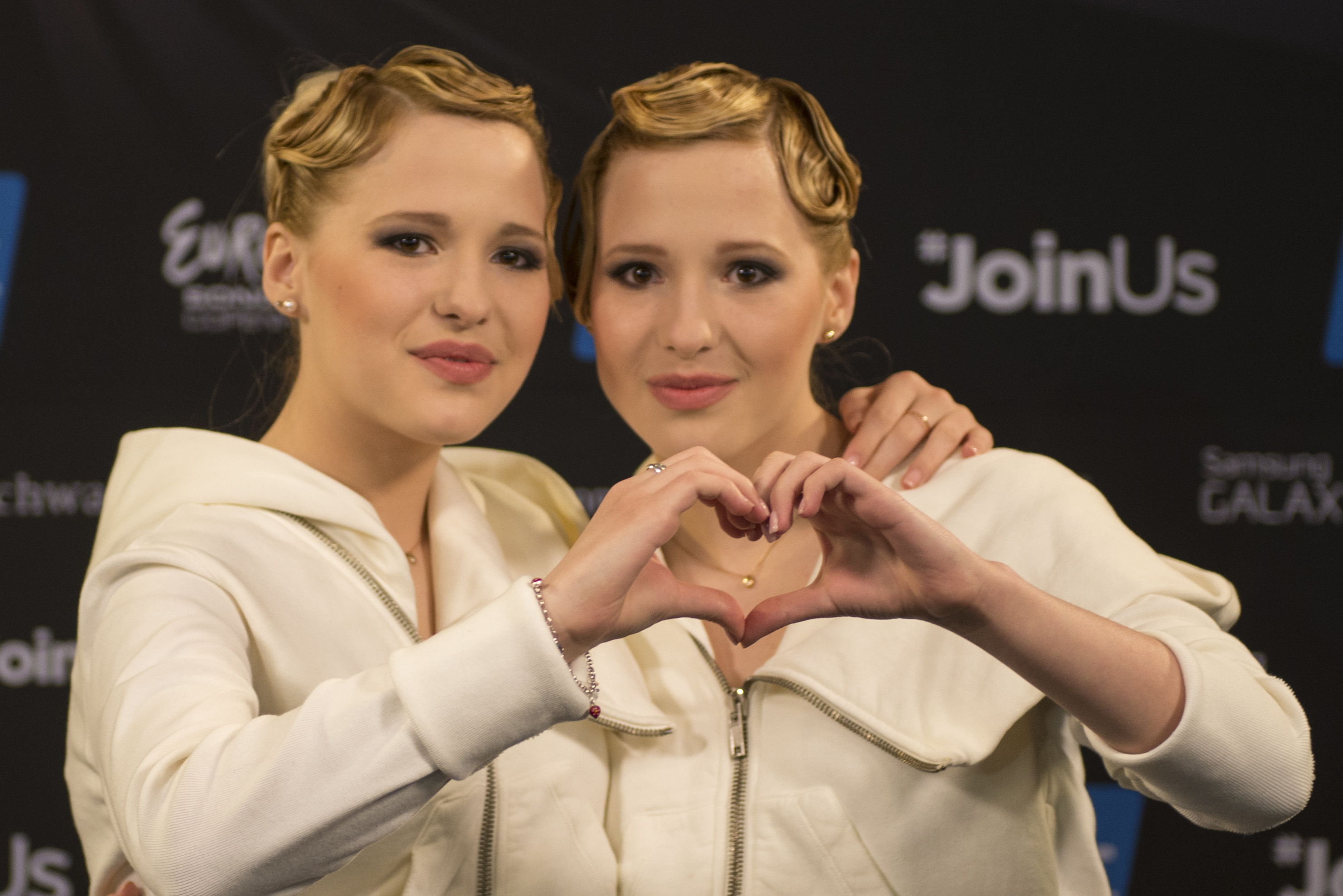
- The Tomalchevy Sisters in 2014

Background information
- Also known as: The Tolmachevy Twins
- Born: Anastasiya Andreyevna Tolmacheva; Maria Andreyevna Tolmacheva; 14 January 1997 (age 29); Kursk, Russia
- Genres: Pop
- Occupations: Singers, actresses
- Years active: 2006–present

Anastasiya (Note: Russian: Анастасия Андреевна Толмачёва) and Maria Andreyevna Tolmacheva (Note: Russian: Мария Андреевна Толмачёва) (born 14 January 1997), known as the Tolmachevy Sisters (Russian: Сёстры Толмачёвы, romanized: Syostry Tolmachyovy), are identical twin singers and actresses from Kursk, Russia. Aged nine, they won the Junior Eurovision Song Contest 2006 with their song "Vesenniy jazz". Eight years later, they represented Russia in the Eurovision Song Contest 2014, placing seventh with the song "Shine". The sisters released an album titled Polovinki in 2007.

== Career ==
=== 2006: Junior Eurovision Song Contest 2006 ===
At the age of nine, the sisters represented Russia at the Junior Eurovision Song Contest 2006 in Bucharest, Romania after being selected in the national final held on 4 June 2006. They later won the Junior Eurovision with their song "Vesenniy jazz" which earned them 154 points, with Belarus finishing in second place with 129 points.

=== 2007–2010: Polovinki and Eurovision appearances ===
In 2007, the sisters released their first album Polovinki. They also performed the song "Katyusha" on the Red Square in Moscow on Victory Day.

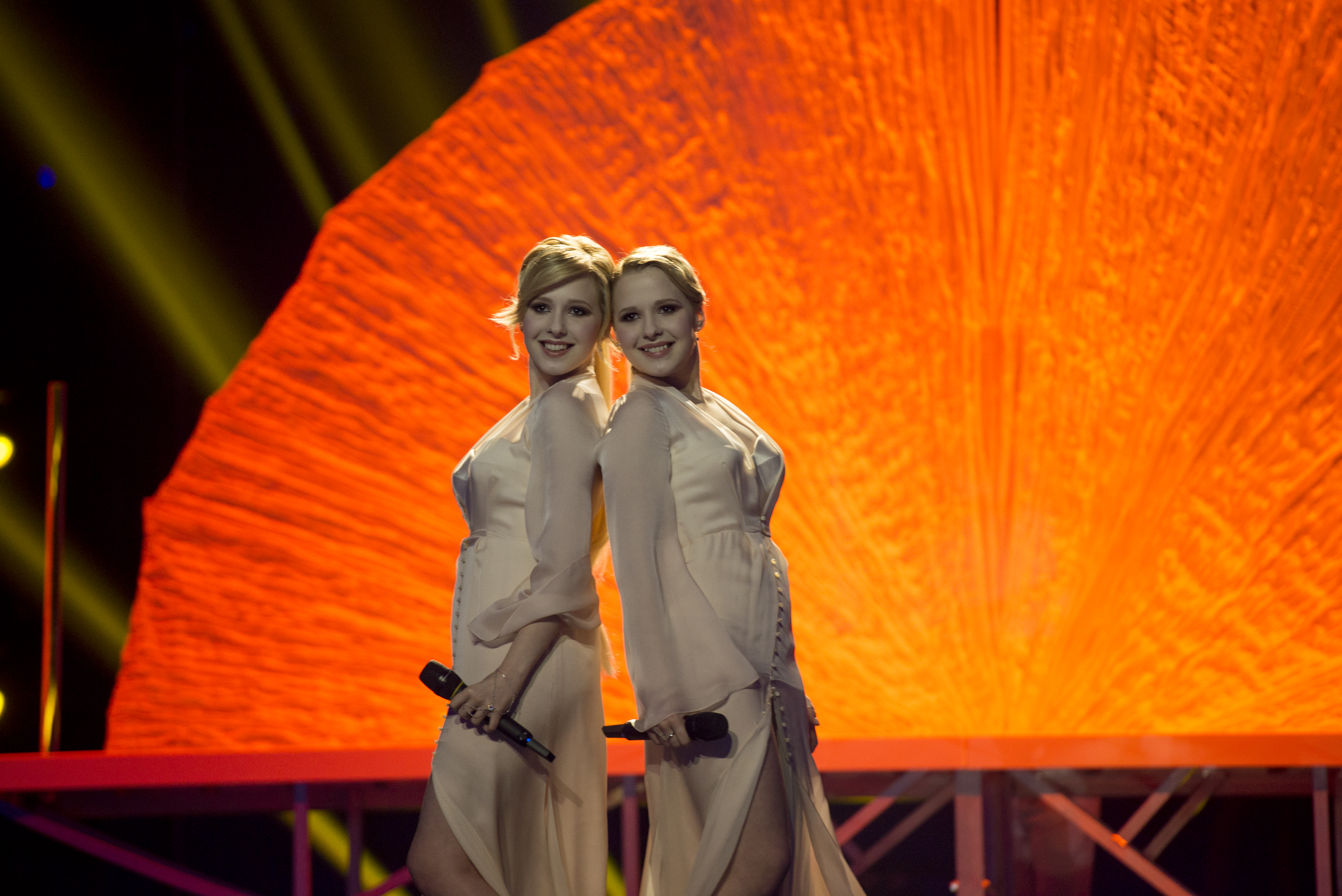
The Tolmachevy Sisters at the Eurovision Song Contest 2014

In 2009, the sisters made an appearance at the opening act of the first semi-final of the Eurovision Song Contest 2009 in Moscow, Russia. In 2010, the sisters were part of an interval act at the Junior Eurovision Song Contest 2010 in Minsk, Belarus, where previous winners of the contest sang their winning songs in a medley.

=== 2014: Eurovision Song Contest 2014 ===
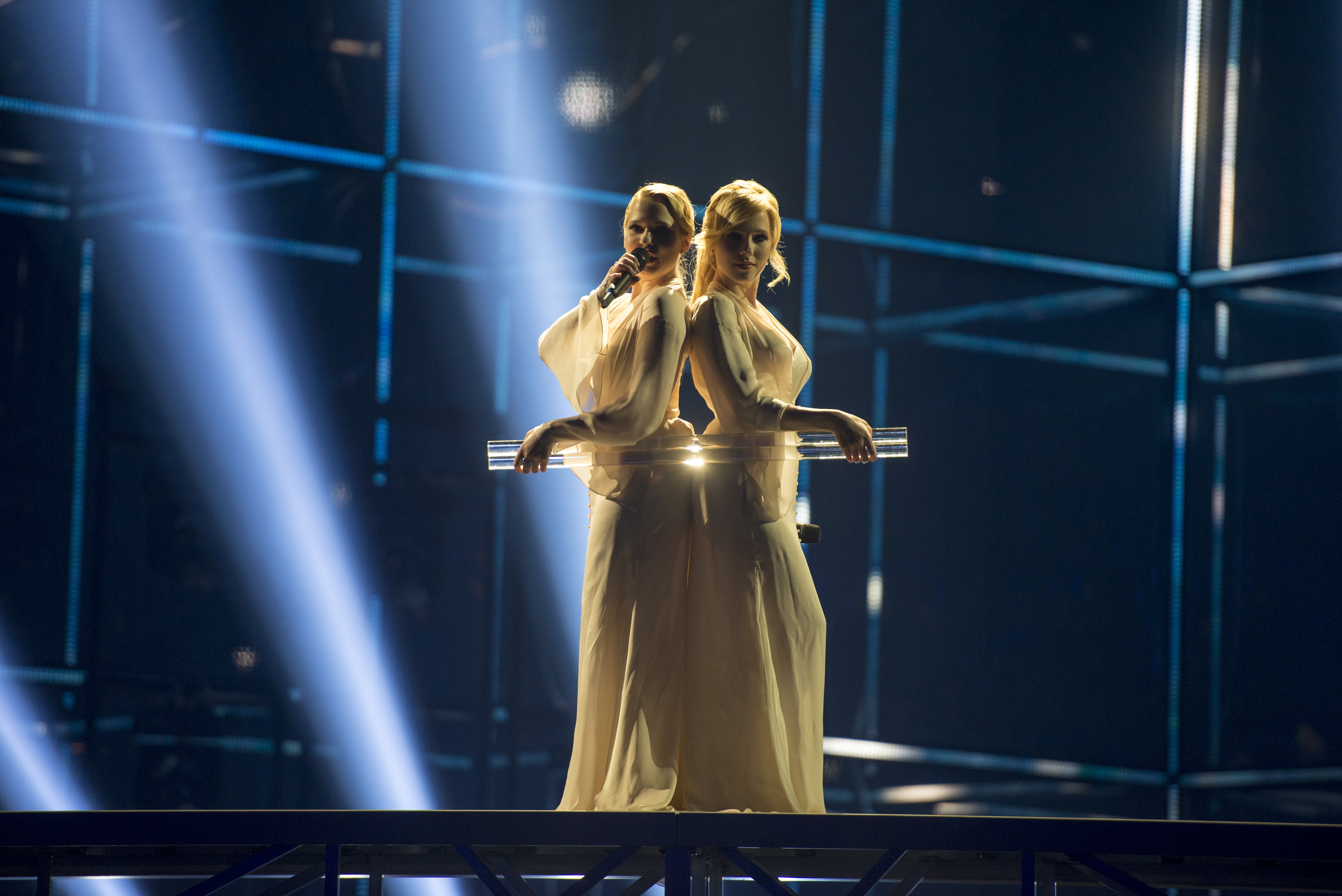
Performance at the Eurovision Song Contest 2014

The Tolmachevy Sisters were internally selected to represent Russia in the Eurovision Song Contest 2014 in Copenhagen, Denmark with the song "Shine". They finished in seventh place with 89 points.

The Tolmachevy Sisters were the subject of booing from the audience during the semi-final and final. The booing was also heard when countries awarded points to Russia. Fraser Nelson wrote: "I can’t remember the last time I heard a Eurovision audience boo anyone; during the Iraq war in 2003, no one booed Britain".

=== 2015–present: After Eurovision ===
At the Eurovision Song Contest 2019, both sisters were members of the Russian jury.

== Discography ==
=== Albums ===
Title	Album details
Polovinki	Released: 2007; Formats: CD, digital download

=== Singles ===
Title	Year	Album
"Vesenniy jazz" (Весенний джаз)	2006	Polovinki
"Shine"	2014	Non-album singles
"Ukhodi" (Уходи)	2014	Non-album singles
"My heart" (Сердце моё)	2015	Non-album singles

== See also ==
- Russia in the Junior Eurovision Song Contest 2006
- Russia in the Eurovision Song Contest 2014

== Notes ==
Awards and achievements
Preceded by Vladislav Krutskikh with "Doroga k solntsu"	Russia in the Junior Eurovision Song Contest; 2006	Succeeded by Alexandra Golovchenko with "Otlichnitsa"
Preceded by (Belarus) Ksenia Sitnik with "My Vmeste"	Winner of the Junior Eurovision Song Contest; 2006	Succeeded by (Belarus) Alexey Zhigalkovich with "S druz'yami"
Preceded by Dina Garipova with "What If"	Russia in the Eurovision Song Contest; 2014	Succeeded by Polina Gagarina with "A Million Voices"
