= Ángeles S.A. =

- Theatrical release poster
- Directed by: Eduard Bosch
- Cinematography: Peter Lyons Collister; Juan Carlos Gómez
- Music by: Christopher Lennertz
- Distributed by: Ensueño Films
- Release date: 21 December 2007
- Running time: 100 minutes
- Country: Spain
- Language: Spanish

Ángeles S.A. (Angels Inc.) is a 2007 Spanish family film released on December 21, 2007. It stars María Isabel in her first film.

== Plot ==
Carlos (Pablo Carbonell) is a happily married man with a loving wife Julia (Silvia Marsó) and father of two children, María Isabel and Dani (Óscar Casas). One day, María performs an singing audition at school (“El Mundo Al Revés”) and gets selected for a festival that is happening there. However, on the same day, her father goes to a business conference in China to sell his angel figurines.

During the airplane trip, he dies in a plane crash and goes to heaven. He meets Simona (Anabel Alonso), the head angel and eventually convinces her to let him become his daughter's guardian angel because she doesn't still have one. She does this by placing him inside the body of María's music teacher after dying in a car accident and thus becomes his daughters guardian angel.

However things change, he finds out that his wife is going to marry his enemy Luis (Juanjo Pardo) and María runs away from home after not liking the idea. Her father goes to look for her and finds her at school. Later Julia stays with her partner for dinner and the teacher acts as babysitter for Dani and María. During the evening, Luis tells her that he has to go on a trip and Julia breaks up with him after not liking his idea.

After reflecting on his errors, he tells her that he is not going on a trip because the most important thing is her and her family. On the day of the school festival, María stays in her room as she doesn't want to go. An angel finds her and tells her that she can sing the song she had composed for her father since her rival student Jennifer is having chronic flatulence attacks and can't sing. This is because the head angel has enchanted a piece of glass with magic that she touched.

María Isabel finally interprets her song with lyrics relating to how much she misses her father (“Cuando No Estás” meaning “Now you’re not here”). Afterwards her father appears and says goodbye to her. María Isabel accepts her mother's boyfriend as a father and they become a happy family again.

== DVD features ==
There is a special release of the film that came with a replica of the necklace that María Isabel wears throughout the movie. The DVD of the film was released in Region 2 only.

1. Music Videos: 'El Mundo Al Revés' and 'Cuando No Estás'
2. Making of Ángeles S.A.
3. Cast Interviews
4. Photo gallery
5. Trailers

== Cast ==
- María Isabel as María Isabel
- Pablo Carbonell as Carlos
- Silvia Marsó as Julia
- Juanjo Pardo as Luis
- Anabel Alonso as Simona
- Óscar Casas as Dani

== Soundtrack ==
The fourth album by María Isabel is also the soundtrack for the film. It was released on November 27, 2007.

Ángeles S.A.

Soundtrack album by María Isabel
- Released: November 2007 (Spain)
- Recorded: 2007
- Genre: Latin
- Label: Spain: Vale Music

María Isabel chronology
Capricornio (2006)	Ángeles S.A. (2007)	Los Lunnis con María Isabel (2009)

=== Track listing ===
1. Mis Ojos Caramelo
2. Angelitos Buenos
3. En Este Instante
4. El Mundo Al Revés
5. Cuando No Estás
6. Entre Montañas
7. Baila A Mi Vera
8. Dime Por Qué
9. Angelitos
10. Cuando No Estás (instrumental)
11. El Mundo Al Revés (instrumental)
12. Angelitos Buenos (instrumental)

== See also ==
- List of films about angels
