= Número 2 =

Studio album by María Isabel
- Released: October 2, 2005 (Spain)
- Recorded: 2005
- Genre: Pop
- Label: Spain: Vale Music
- Producer: Carlos Quintero & Mar de Pablos

María Isabel chronology
No Me Toques Las Palmas Que Me Conozco (2004)	Número 2 (2005)	Capricornio (2006)

Número 2 is María Isabel's second album and was released in 2005.

== Track listing ==
1. "Pues va a ser que no"
2. "Quién da la vez"
3. "Mi abuela"
4. "María Isabel número 2"
5. "Tu libertad"
6. "3x2"
7. "Me enamoro"
8. "Original"
9. "La reina de la fiesta"
10. "Piel de chocolate"
11. "De Ayamonte pa'l mundo"
12. "En mi jardín" (bonus track)

== Singles ==
"Pues va a ser que no"
"En mi jardín"
"Quién Da La Vez"
