= Areas (moth) =

Scientific classification
- Kingdom: Animalia
- Phylum: Arthropoda
- Class: Insecta
- Order: Lepidoptera
- Superfamily: Noctuoidea
- Family: Erebidae
- Subfamily: Arctiinae
- Subtribe: Spilosomina
- Genus: Areas; Walker, 1855

Type species
- Areas orientalis Walker, 1855

Synonyms
- Melanareas Butler, 1889

Genus of moths

Areas is a genus of tiger moths in the family Erebidae.

== Species ==
- Areas galactina (Hoeven, 1840)

=== Subgenus Melanareas Butler, 1889 ===
- Areas imperialis (Kollar, [1844])
