= AREA (fashion label) =

American fashion label

AREA is a fashion label founded in 2014 by Beckett Fogg and Piotrek Panszczyk. It is known for its use of crystals.

Simone Biles wore a Swarovski crystal covered dress by Area for the 2021 Met Gala for the opening of In America: A Lexicon of Fashion.

In December 2023, the company announced that it had partnered with the fashion brand business accelerator Tomorrow London Ltd.

Taylor Swift wore a pair of Area "crystal slit jeans" at Super Bowl LVIII. Swift wore a jeweled bralette top designed by the company for the cover of her 2025 album The Life of a Showgirl.

In February 2025, the company announced the appointment of Nicholas Aburn as creative director, replacing co-founder Piotrek Panszczyk in this role.
