= Pedro Madeira =

Portuguese singer

- Birth name: Pedro Alexandre Gomes Madeira
- Also known as: PM
- Born: 11 November 1992 (age 32); Vendas Novas, Portugal
- Genres: Pop, ballad, hip hop
- Occupation(s): Singer, songwriter
- Instrument(s): Vocals, piano, guitar
- Years active: 2006–present
- Website: pedromadeira.com.pt

Pedro Madeira (born 11 November 1992 in Vendas Novas, Portugal) is a Portuguese singer. He represented Portugal at the Junior Eurovision Song Contest 2006 with the song "Deixa-me sentir".

== Discography ==
=== Albums ===
- Dá-me a tua mão (2007)
- Viagem (2009)
- Onze (2012)
- De Lisboa para ti (2014)

=== Singles ===
- "Deixa-me sentir" (2006)
- "Descobre-me" (2009)
- "Tempo para viver" (2010)
- "Inflamável" (2012)
- "Dueto" (2012)
- "O Rapaz do Piano" (2012)
- "A Lenda" (2013)
- "Aprendiz" (2013)
- "LX" (2014)
- "Relógio" (2015)

== See also ==
- Portugal in the Junior Eurovision Song Contest

Awards and achievements
Preceded by none	Portugal in the Junior Eurovision Song Contest; 2006	Succeeded by Jorge Leiria with "Só quero é cantar"
