= Ksenia Sitnik =

Belarusian pop singer (born 1995)

Ksenia Sitnik Ксенія Сітнік
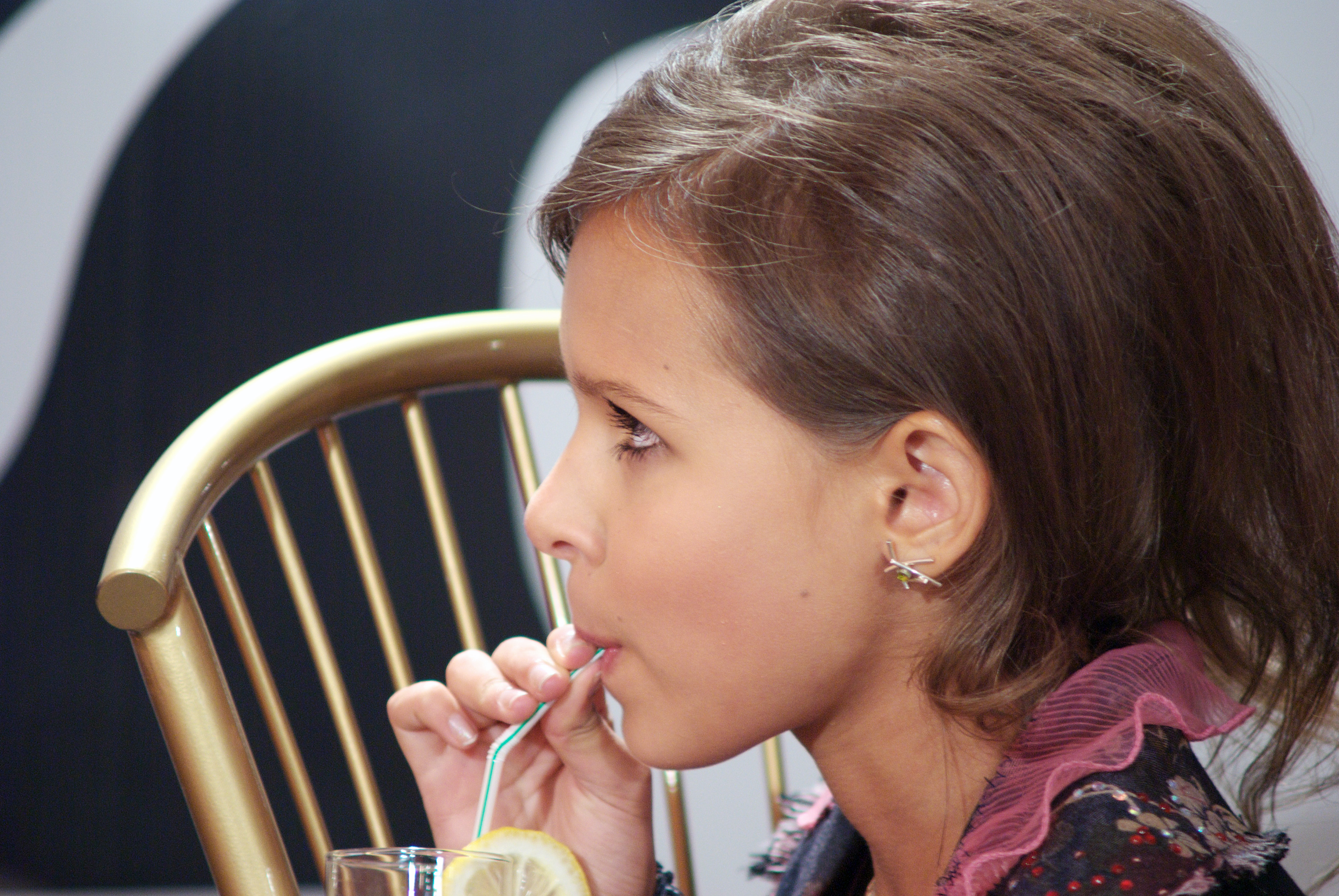

Background information
- Born: Ksenia Mikhailovna Sitnik; 15 May 1995 (age 31); Mazyr, Belarus
- Genres: Teen pop; dance-pop
- Occupation: Singer
- Years active: 2005–present

Ksenia Mikhailovna Sitnik (Note: Belarusian: Ксенія Міхайлаўна Сітнік, translit. Ksienija Michajlaŭna Sitnik; Russian: Ксения Михайловна Ситник, translit. Kseniya Mikhaylovna Sitnik) (born 15 May 1995), sometimes also transliterated as Kseniya Sitnik or Xenia Sitnik, is a Belarusian pop singer. She represented Belarus in the Junior Eurovision Song Contest 2005, which she won with the self-penned song "My vmeste" (We Are Together).

== Biography ==
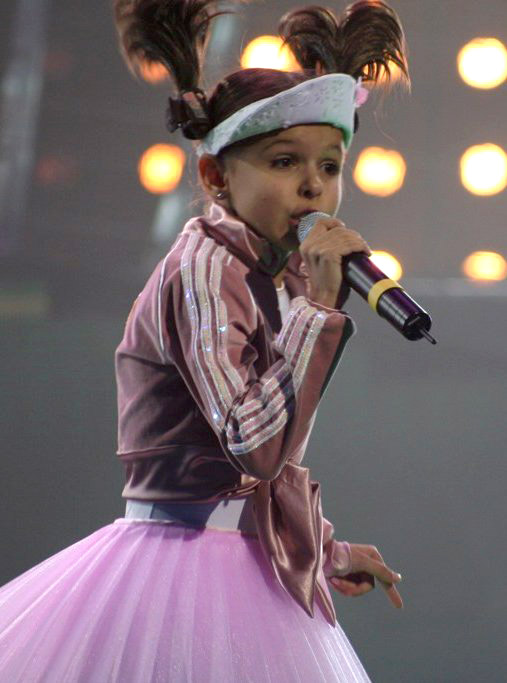
Sitnik performing at the Junior Eurovision Song Contest 2005

Ksenia Sitnik was born on 15 May 1995 in the city of Mazyr. She won first prize at the international children's contest at the Slavianski Bazaar in Vitebsk in July 2005. Sitnik won the Junior Eurovision Song Contest in 2005, where she represented her home country with the song My Vmeste. Despite the song not being particularly popular in pre-contest polls: for example, in the Europrediction poll, Sitnik came last with no points. Sitnik won, albeit narrowly – she had only three points more than the runner-up, Antonio José Sánchez Mazuecos from Spain.

In November 2006, Sitnik released a CD with accompanying music book called My Vmeste ("We Are Together"). She has released three music videos: Malenkiy Korablik ("Little Ship") in 2006, Prostaya Pesenka ("Simple Song") in 2007 and Non-stop in 2009.

== Discography ==
- My vmeste (2006)
- Respublika Kseniya (2010)

== See also ==
- Junior Eurovision Song Contest
- Belarus in the Junior Eurovision Song Contest

== Notes ==
Awards and achievements
Preceded by Yahor Vauchok with "Spjavajce sa mnoj"	Belarus in the Junior Eurovision Song Contest; 2005	Succeeded by Andrey Kunets with "Novyi den"
Preceded by (Spain) María Isabel with "Antes Muerta que Sencilla"	Winner of the Junior Eurovision Song Contest; 2005	Succeeded by (Russia) Tolmachevy Twins with "Vesenniy Jazz"
