= Thor Salden =

Thor!
- Also known as: Thor!
- Born: Thor Salden; 28 November 1997 (age 28); Antwerp
- Origin: Schoten, Belgium
- Genres: Pop
- Occupation: Singer
- Years active: 2006–2008; 2017; 2020
- Labels: Polydor, EMI

Thor Salden (born 28 November 1997), better known as Thor!, is a former child singer. Salden rose to fame in 2006, being the Belgian contestant at the Junior Eurovision Song Contest 2006 with "Een tocht door het donker". The song topped the Flemish Ultratop charts for one week. Salden withdrew from the stage at the age of 11.

== Life and career ==
Salden was born in Antwerp and lived in Schoten. In 2006, at the age of eight, he participated in the Belgian preselection for the Junior Eurovision Song Contest 2006 in Bucharest, Romania. Salden won both the first semi-final of 17 September and the final of 1 October 2006 of the selection. In the opening of the shows, he performed together with Attic and Clouseau.

Salden had first sung and recorded his self-written "Een toch door het donker" on a Fisher-Price toy recorder. The eventual final version of "Een tocht door het donker" ("A Journey Through The Dark"), produced by Peter Gillis was released as a single on 13 October 2006. Initially the song reached No. 1 in the Ultratop 50, No. 2 in Belgium's national download music chart and No. 8 in the Radio 2 Top 30. After 16 weeks in the Ultratop 50, Thor received a golden record on 30 January 2007 as a result of over 15,000 single sales and legal downloads of the song, making him the youngest Belgian artist to receive this award.

In the run-up to his Junior Eurovision participation, Salden was honoured by the municipality of Schoten for his victory in the pre-selection. Schoten city council also announced their plans surrounding the international Junior Eurovision final. Locals were able to watch the international final of the song contest on a screen on the local market square. At the contest, Salden eventually finished 7th, out of fifteenth.

On 22 December 2006, Salden auctioned off the T-shirt he wore during the Junior Eurovision Song Contest for the Studio Brussel charity Music for life.

Following his Junior Eurovision participation, Salden released only one more single, "We gaan naar de zee", in 2007. The song peaked at No. 20 at the Belgian Ultratop charts. In 2008, Thor was one of the participants of the Ketnet programme Ketnetpop, in which he was coached to perform his song at a live concert.

In December 2008, Salden, then aged 11, announced that he was withdrawing from performing, citing a discontinued interest in singing. In 2010, he made a short appearance during the Belgian pre-selection for Junior Eurovision 2010, being part of a jury of past contestants.

In 2017, he performed at a celebratory concert of Ketnet's 20th jubileum in the Antwerp Sportpaleis. It was Salden's first performance in a decade.

In 2020, he co-presented one day on NRJ Radio, after the request of his cousin, who worked as a DJ at the station. Meanwhile, he told Belgian media that he was not interested in making new music and revealed that he never had musical ambitions. "I've stopped doing music. I don't even know whether I had any ambitions as a child to do something with music. I had seen a commercial on television about applying to Junior Eurovision, that's why I took part. But the dream to become a pop artist, I didn't have.".

== Discography ==
=== Singles ===
Title	Year	Chart positions
Title	Year	Ultratop Flanders
"Een tocht door het donker"	2006	1
"We gaan naar de zee"	2007	20

Awards and achievements
Preceded by Lindsay	Belgium in the Junior Eurovision Song Contest; 2006	Succeeded by Trust
