= Area (Macedonian band) =

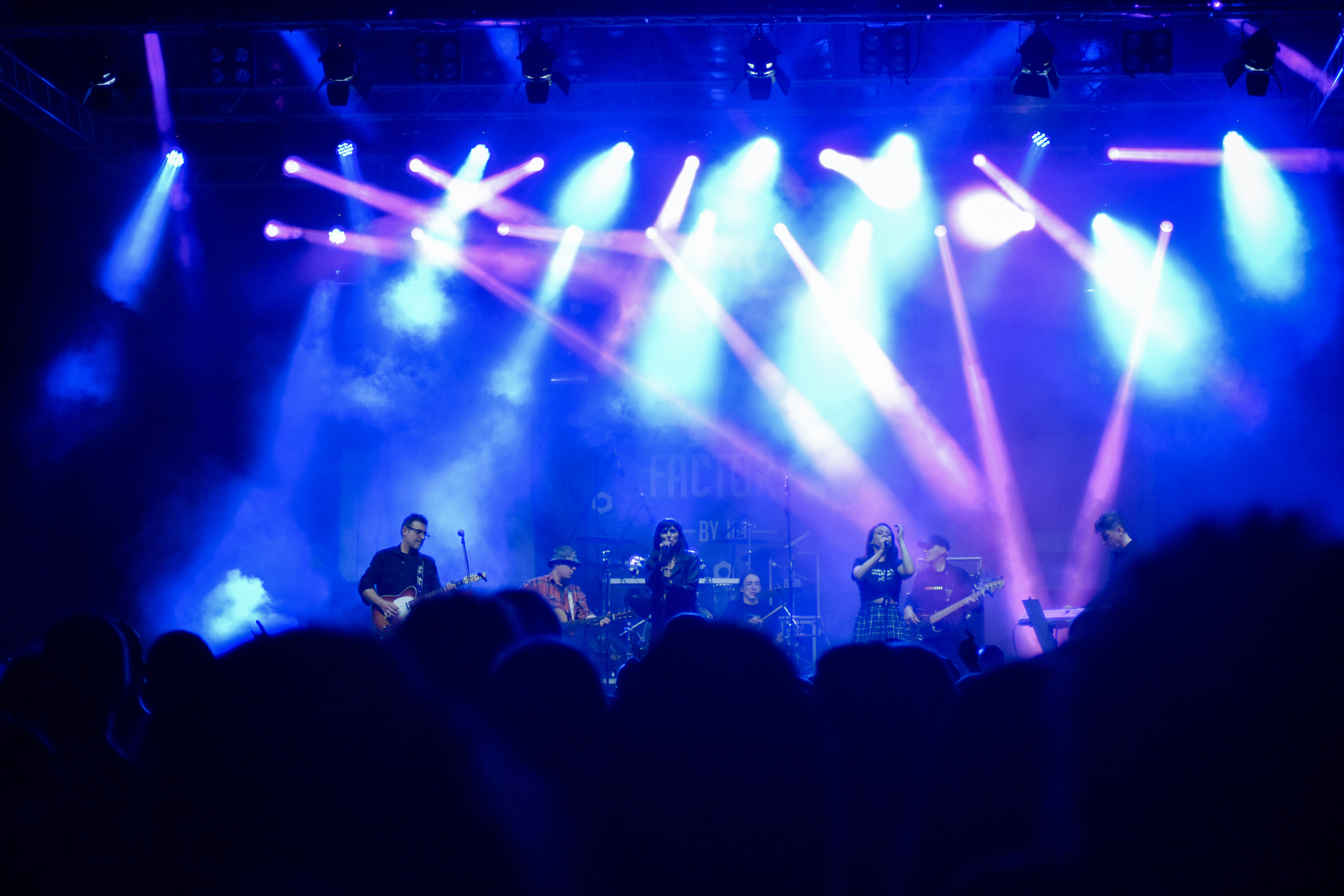
- Area performing at Moto Rock Fest in Kumanovo, 2022

Background information
- Origin: Gostivar, North Macedonia
- Genres: rock
- Years active: 1991–present
- Label: Avalon production
- Members: Ružica Milošeska Brčioska (vocals); Ivica Brčioski (guitar); Jordan Gavriloski (bass guitar); Goran Brčioski (keyboard); Viktor Angjelkoski (drums); Elena Brčioska (backing vocals)

Area is a Macedonian rock band from Gostivar. Ružica Milošeska Brčioska serves as the band's main vocalist and she is accompanied by guitarist Ivica Brčioski, bass guitarist Jordan Gavriloski, keyboardist Goran Brčioski, drummer Viktor Angjelkoski and backing vocalist Elena Brčioska. They have released seven studio albums in the span of their 30-year long career.

== Music career ==
The band was founded in 1991 and released their first song "Neka ljubovta bide vistina". In 1992, the group performed at Pop Rock Fest in Skopje, where it gained the first place and recorded its first album.. The album, titled Slučajno tuka was declared to be the Debut Album of the Year. Following the success of their first album, Area performed across North Macedonia until the end of 1994, after which it took a longer hiatus.
