= Belarus in the Junior Eurovision Song Contest =

- Junior Eurovision Song Contest
- Former participating broadcaster: Belarusian Television and Radio Company (BTRC)

Participation summary
- Appearances: 18
- First appearance: 2003
- Last appearance: 2020
- Highest placement: 1st: 2005, 2007
- Host: 2010, 2018
- Participation history: 2003; 2004; 2005; 2006; 2007; 2008; 2009; 2010; 2011; 2012; 2013; 2014; 2015; 2016; 2017; 2018; 2019; 2020; 2021 – 2025
- For the most recent participation see Belarus in the Junior Eurovision Song Contest 2020

Belarus has been represented at the Junior Eurovision Song Contest in every edition since its inception in 2003 until 2020. The Belarusian participating broadcaster in the contest is Belarusian Television and Radio Company (BTRC). The broadcaster hosted the contest at the Minsk-Arena in 2010 and again in 2018. Its first entry at the 2003 contest was "Tantsuy" by Volha Satsiuk, which finished in fourth place out of sixteen participating entries, achieving a score of 103 points.

Belarus was one of two countries to have never missed an edition of the contest, the other one being the Netherlands, until the broadcaster was expelled from the EBU in 2021. It is also one of the two countries, along with Serbia, to have participated in the Junior Eurovision Song Contest before debuting in the adult one. The country hosted the contest at the Minsk-Arena in 2010 and again in 2018.

== History ==
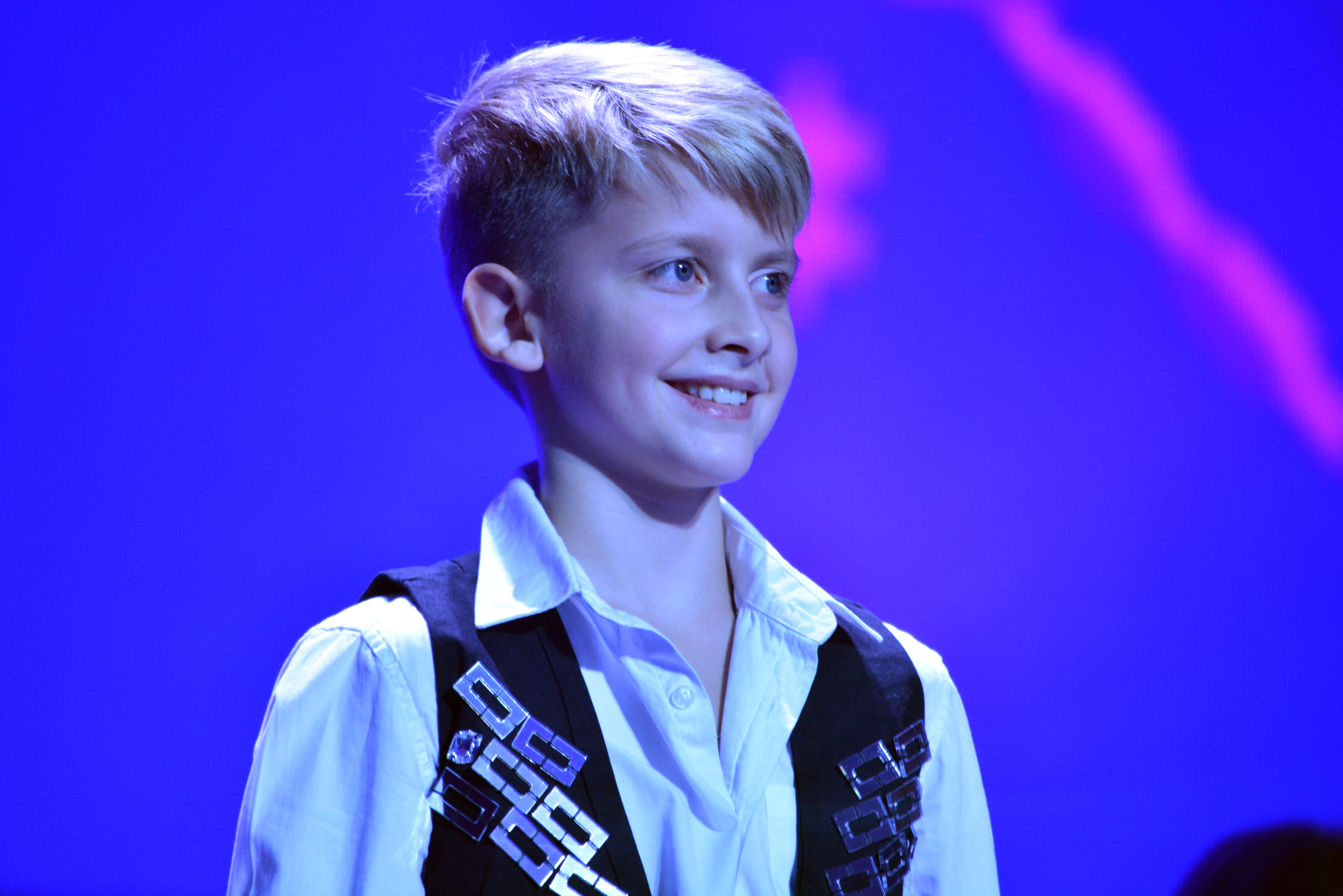
Ilya Volkov at Junior Eurovision Song Contest 2013, Kyiv.

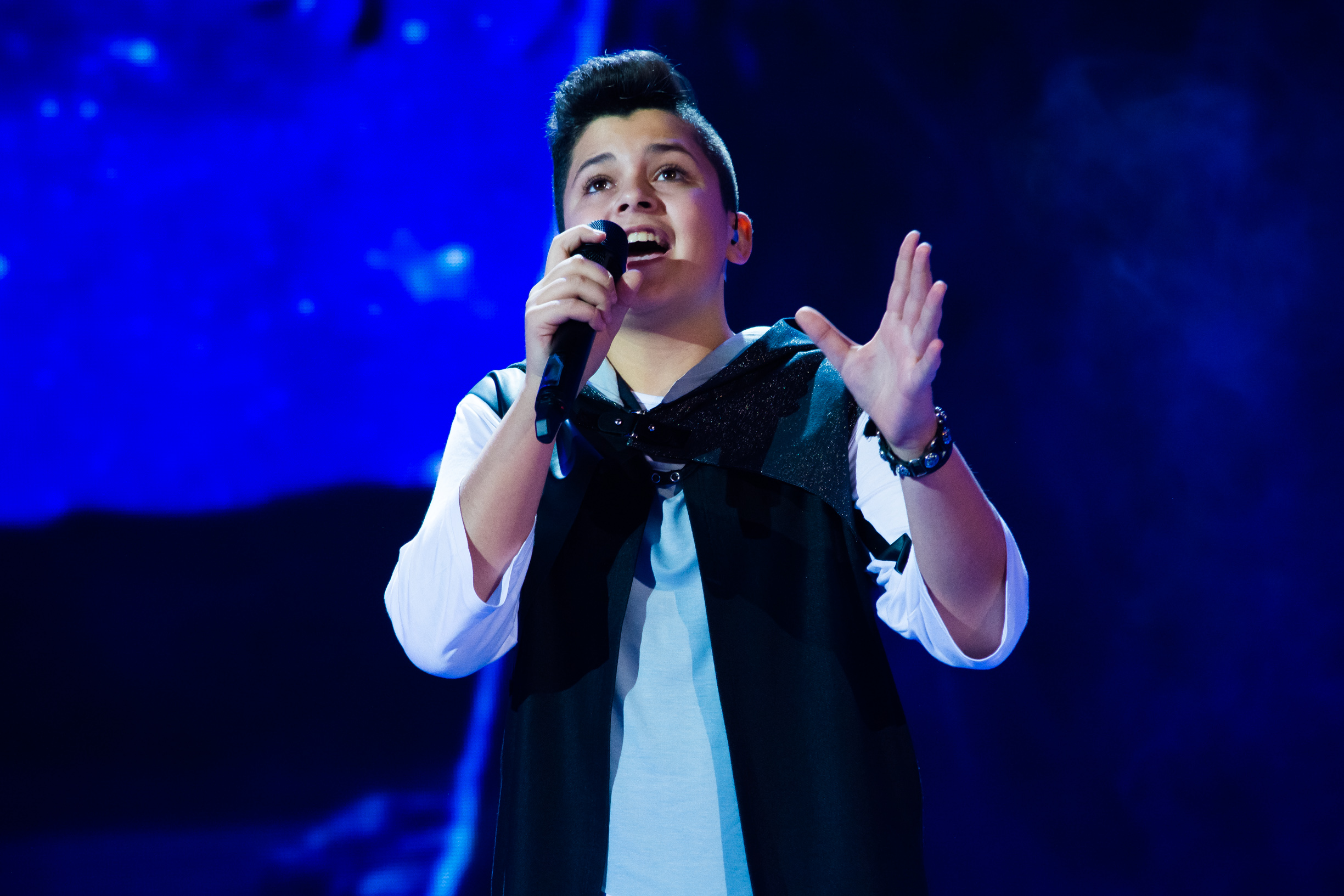
Ruslan Aslanov at Junior Eurovision Song Contest 2015, Sofia.

Belarus was one of the sixteen countries to have made their debut at the inaugural Junior Eurovision Song Contest 2003, which took place on 15 November 2003 at the Forum in Copenhagen, Denmark. The Belarusian broadcaster, Belarusian Television and Radio Company (BTRC), held a national final to select its representative for the contest. Child-singer Volha Satsiuk was the first participant to represent Belarus with the song "Tantsuy", which finished in fourth place out of sixteen participating entries, achieving a score of one hundred and three points.

Belarus took part in every edition of the contest from 2003 to 2020, winning the contest twice: in 2005 with Ksenia Sitnik performing the song "My vmeste"; and again in 2007 with Alexey Zhigalkovich performing the entry "S druz'yami". Viewing figures and interest for the Junior Eurovision in Belarus is very high; according to former EBU Executive Supervisor Svante Stockselius in 2010, Junior Eurovision was then considered "one of Belarus' most popular television shows". On 8 June 2009, the EBU confirmed that Belarus had won the rights to organise the Junior Eurovision Song Contest 2010 over bids from Russia and Malta; after undergoing construction in 2009, the 15,000-spectator Minsk-Arena hosted the event.

On 17 May 2016, Belarus confirmed that the country would be making its fourteenth Junior Eurovision appearance at the 2016 contest. The national selection show took place on 26 August 2016, in which ten acts competed in a live televised broadcast, with the winner having been determined by 50% professional jury and 50% public televoting. Alexander Minyonok won the 2016 Belarusian final with the song "Muzyka moikh pobed" and represented Belarus at the 2016 contest. On 15 October 2017, it was announced that Belarus would host the contest for a second time in the capital, Minsk. On 21 November 2017, Belarus' Deputy Prime Minister Vasily Zharko stated that the contest was scheduled to be held at Minsk Arena in November 2018. On 18 March 2018, Minsk Arena was confirmed as the venue by the contest organisers.

On 28 May 2021, the EBU announced it was suspending BTRC's membership due to "exceptional concerns" over its broadcasts. The broadcaster was given two weeks to respond before the suspension came into effect, which it failed to do publicly. Exclusion from EBU membership meant that BTRC would lose the rights to broadcast and participate in Eurovision events. On 1 July, the EBU officially imposed a three-year suspension on BTRC, scheduled to end on 1 July 2024, and the broadcaster subsequently acknowledged and accepted its temporary inability to take part in Eurovision. Following this, the director general of BTRC, Ivan Eismont, made a statement regarding the EBU's actions, in which he claimed that the national response to Belarus' exclusion from the adult contest was ambivalent, but that there was general sadness regarding their inability to compete at the junior contest after their success at the event over the years. The EBU had the right to review the suspension at any point prior to its official expiration, however, in April 2024 it declared that there was "no reason to change [its] position at the current time", thus extending the suspension indefinitely.

== Participation overview ==
Table key
1	First place
2	Second place
3	Third place

Year	Artist	Song	Language	Place	Points
2003	Volha Satsiuk	"Tantsuy" (Танцуй)	Belarusian	4	103
2004	Egor Volchek	"Spiavajcie sa mnoju" (Спявайце са мною)	Belarusian	14	9
2005	Ksenia Sitnik	"My vmeste" (Мы вместе)	Russian	1	149
2006	Andrey Kunets	"Noviy den" (Новый день)	Russian	2	129
2007	Alexey Zhigalkovich	"S druz'yami" (С друзьями)	Russian	1	137
2008	Dasha, Alina & Karyna	"Serdtse Belarusi" (Сердце Беларуси)	Belarusian, Russian	6	86
2009	Yury Demidovich	"Volshebniy krolik" (Волшебный кролик)	Russian, Latin	9	48
2010	Daniil Kozlov	"Muzyki svet" (Музыки свет)	Russian	5	85
2011	Lidiya Zablotskaya	"Angely dobra" (Ангелы добра)	Russian	3	99
2012	Egor Zheshko	"A more-more" (А море-море)	Russian	9	56
2013	Ilya Volkov	"Poy so mnoy" (Пой со мной)	Russian	3	108
2014	Nadezhda Misyakova	"Sokal" (Сокал)	Belarusian	7	71
2015	Ruslan Aslanov	"Volshebstvo (Magic)" (Волшебство)	Russian, English	4	105
2016	Alexander Minyonok	"Muzyka moikh pobed (Music Is My Only Way)" (Музыка моих побед)	Russian, English	7	177
2017	Helena Meraai	"I Am the One"	Russian	5	149
2018	Daniel Yastremski	"Time"	Russian, English	11	114
2019	Liza Misnikova	"Pepelny (Ashen)" (Пепельный)	Russian, English	11	92
2020	Arina Pehtereva	"Aliens"	Russian, English	5	130

== Commentators and spokespersons ==
The contests are broadcast online worldwide through the official Junior Eurovision Song Contest website junioreurovision.tv and YouTube. In 2015, the online broadcasts featured commentary in English by junioreurovision.tv editor Luke Fisher and 2011 Bulgarian Junior Eurovision Song Contest entrant Ivan Ivanov.

The Belarusian broadcaster, BTRC, sent its own commentators to each contest in order to provide commentary in the Russian language. Spokespersons were also chosen by the national broadcaster in order to announce the awarding points from Belarus. The table below list the details of each commentator and spokesperson since 2003.

Year	Channel	Commentator	Spokesperson	Ref.
2003	Belarus 1	Denis Kurian	Unknown	
2004	Belarus 1	Denis Kurian	Daria	
2005	Belarus 1, Belarus 24	Denis Kurian	Anton Lediaev	
2006	Belarus 1, Belarus 24	Denis Kurian	Liza Anton-Baychuk	
2007	Belarus 1, Belarus 24	Denis Kurian	Alexander Rogachevskiy	
2008	Belarus 1, Belarus 24	Denis Kurian	Anjelica Misevich	
2009	Belarus 1, Belarus 24	Denis Kurian	Arina Aleshkevich	
2010	Belarus 1, Belarus 24	Pavel Lozovik	Anastasiya Butyugina	
2011	Belarus 1, Belarus 24	Denis Kurian	Anna Kovalyova	
2012	Belarus 1, Belarus 24	Pavel Lozovik	Maria Drozdova	
2013	Belarus 1, Belarus 24	Anatoliy Lipetskiy	Alexandra Tkach	
2014	Belarus 1, Belarus 24	Anatoliy Lipetskiy	Katerina Taperkina	
2015	Belarus 1, Belarus 24	Anatoliy Lipetskiy	Valeria Drobyshevskaya	
2016	Belarus 1, Belarus 24	Julia Pertsova	Ruslan Aslanov	
2017	Belarus 1, Belarus 24	Evgeny Perlin	Saba Karazanashvili	
2018	Belarus 1, Belarus 24	Georgiy Koldun and Andrey Makaenok	Arina Rovba	
2019	Belarus 1, Belarus 24	Evgeny Perlin	Emilia	
2020	Belarus 1, Belarus 24	Pavel Lazovik	Ksenia Galetskaya	
2021–2026	Suspended from broadcasting		Did not participate	

== Hostings ==
Year	Location	Venue	Presenters
2010	Minsk	Minsk-Arena	Leila Ismailava and Denis Kurian
2018	Minsk	Minsk-Arena	Eugene Perlin, Helena Meraai and Zena

== See also ==
- Belarus in the Eurovision Song Contest – Senior version of the Junior Eurovision Song Contest.
- Belarus in the Turkvision Song Contest – A contest for countries and regions which are of Turkic-speaking or Turkic ethnicity.
