= List of Junior Eurovision Song Contest entries =

This is a chronological list of all the artists and songs that have competed in the Junior Eurovision Song Contest from 2003 to 2025.

== Entries ==
Table key
1	Winner
2	Second place
3	Third place
◁	Last place

List of entries in the Junior Eurovision Song Contest
#	№	Country	#	Artist	Song	Language	Pl.	Sc.
1st Junior Eurovision Song Contest 2003, Copenhagen, Denmark
1	01	Greece	1	Nicolas Ganopoulos	"Fili gia panta" (Φίλοι για πάντα)	Greek	8	53
2	02	Croatia	1	Dino Jelušić	"Ti si moja prva ljubav"	Croatian	1	134
3	03	Cyprus	1	Theodora Rafti	"Mia efhi" (Μια ευχή)	Greek	14	16
4	04	Belarus	1	Volha Satsiuk	"Tantsuy" (Танцуй)	Belarusian	4	103
5	05	Latvia	1	Dzintars Čīča	"Tu esi vasarā"	Latvian	9	37
6	06	Macedonia	1	Marija & Viktorija	"Ti ne me poznavaš" (Ти не ме познаваш)	Macedonian	12	19
7	07	Poland	1	Katarzyna Żurawik	"Coś mnie nosi"	Polish	16 ◁	3
8	08	Norway	1	2U	"Sinnsykt gal forelsket"	Norwegian	13	18
9	09	Spain	1	Sergio	"Desde el cielo"	Spanish	2	125
10	10	Romania	1	Bubu	"Tobele sunt viața mea"	Romanian	10	35
11	11	Belgium	1	X!NK	"De vriendschapsband"	Dutch	6	83
12	12	United Kingdom	1	Tom Morley	"My Song for the World"	English	3	118
13	13	Denmark	1	Anne Gadegaard	"Arabiens drøm"	Danish	5	93
14	14	Sweden	1	The Honeypies	"Stoppa mig"	Swedish	15	12
15	15	Malta	1	Sarah Harrison	"Like a Star"	English	7	56
16	16	Netherlands	1	Roel Felius	"Mijn ogen zeggen alles"	Dutch	11	23
2nd Junior Eurovision Song Contest 2004, Lillehammer, Norway
17	01	Greece	2	Secret Band	"O palios mou eaftos" (Ο παλιός μου εαυτός)	Greek	9	48
18	02	Malta	2	Young Talent Team	"Power of a Song"	English	12	14
19	03	Netherlands	2	Klaartje & Nicky	"Hij is een kei"	Dutch	11	27
20	04	Switzerland	1	Demis Mirarchi	"Birichino"	Italian	16	4
21	05	Norway	2	@lek	"En stjerne skal jeg bli"	Norwegian	13	12
22	06	France	1	Thomas Pontier	"Si on voulait bien"	French	6	78
23	07	Macedonia	2	Martina Siljanovska	"Zabava" (Забава)	Macedonian	7	64
24	08	Poland	2	KWADro	"Łap życie"	Polish	17 ◁	3
25	09	Cyprus	2	Marios Tofi	"Onira" (Όνειρα)	Greek	8	61
26	10	Belarus	2	Egor Volchek	"Spiavajcie so mnoj" (Спявайце со мной)	Belarusian	14	9
27	11	Croatia	2	Nika Turković	"Hej mali"	Croatian	3	126
28	12	Latvia	2	Mārtiņš Tālbergs and C-Stones Juniors	"Balts vai melns"	Latvian	17 ◁	3
29	13	United Kingdom	2	Cory Spedding	"The Best Is Yet to Come"	English	2	140
30	14	Denmark	2	Cool Kids	"Pigen er min"	Danish	5	116
31	15	Spain	2	María Isabel	"Antes muerta que sencilla"	Spanish	1	171
32	16	Sweden	2	Limelights	"Varför jag?"	Swedish	15	8
33	17	Belgium	2	Free Spirits	"Accroche-toi"	French	10	37
34	18	Romania	2	Noni Răzvan Ene	"Îți mulțumesc"	Romanian	4	123
3rd Junior Eurovision Song Contest 2005, Hasselt, Belgium
35	01	Greece	3	Alexandros & Kalli	"Tora einai i seira mas" (Tώρα είναι η σειρά μας)	Greek	6	88
36	02	Denmark	3	Nicolai	"Shake Shake Shake"	Danish, English	4	121
37	03	Croatia	3	Lorena Jelusić	"Rock Baby"	Croatian	12	36
38	04	Romania	3	Alina Eremia	"Țurai!"	Romanian	5	89
39	05	United Kingdom	3	Joni Fuller	"How Does It Feel?"	English	14	28
40	06	Sweden	3	M+	"Gränslös kärlek"	Swedish	15	22
41	07	Russia	1	Vladislav Krutskikh and Street Magic	"Doroga k solntsu" (Дорога к солнцу)	Russian	9	66
42	08	Macedonia	3	Denis Dimoski	"Rodendeski baknež" (Родендески бакнеж)	Macedonian	8	68
43	09	Netherlands	3	Tess	"Stupid"	Dutch	7	82
44	10	Serbia and Montenegro	1	Filip Vučić	"Ljubav pa fudbal" (Љубав па фудбал)	Montenegrin	13	29
45	11	Latvia	3	Kids4Rock	"Es esmu maza jauka meitene"	Latvian	11	50
46	12	Belgium	3	Lindsay	"Mes rêves"	French	10	63
47	13	Malta	3	Thea and Friends	"Make It Right!"	English	16 ◁	18
48	14	Norway	3	Malin	"Sommer og skolefri"	Norwegian	3	123
49	15	Spain	3	Antonio José	"Te traigo flores"	Spanish	2	146
50	16	Belarus	3	Ksenia Sitnik	"My vmeste" (Мы вместе)	Russian	1	149
4th Junior Eurovision Song Contest 2006, Bucharest, Romania
51	01	Portugal	1	Pedro Madeira	"Deixa-me sentir"	Portuguese	14	22
52	02	Cyprus	3	Luis Panagiotou & Christina Christofi	"Agoria koritsia" (Αγόρια κορίτσια)	Greek	8	58
53	03	Netherlands	4	Kimberly	"Goed"	Dutch	12	44
54	04	Romania	4	New Star Music	"Povestea mea"	Romanian	6	80
55	05	Ukraine	1	Nazar Slyusarchuk	"Khlopchyk Rock 'n' Roll" (Хлопчик рок н рол)	Ukrainian	9	58
56	06	Spain	4	Dani Fernández	"Te doy mi voz"	Spanish	4	90
57	07	Serbia	1	Neustrašivi učitelji stranih jezika	"Učimo strane jezike" (Учимо стране језике)	Serbian, English	5	81
58	08	Malta	4	Sophie Debattista	"Extra Cute"	English	11	48
59	09	Macedonia	4	Zana Aliu	"Vljubena" (Вљубена)	Macedonian	15 ◁	14
60	10	Sweden	4	Molly Sandén	"Det finaste någon kan få"	Swedish	3	116
61	11	Greece	4	Chloe Sofia Boleti	"Den peirazei" (Δεν πειράζει)	Greek	13	35
62	12	Belarus	4	Andrey Kunets	"Noviy den" (Новый день)	Russian	2	129
63	13	Belgium	4	Thor!	"Een tocht door het donker"	Dutch	7	71
64	14	Croatia	4	Mateo Đido	"Lea"	Croatian	10	50
65	15	Russia	2	Tolmachevy Twins	"Vesenniy Jazz" (Весенний джаз)	Russian	1	154
5th Junior Eurovision Song Contest 2007, Rotterdam, Netherlands
66	01	Georgia	1	Mariam Romelashvili	"Odelia Ranuni" (ოდელია რანუნი)	Georgian	4	116
67	02	Belgium	5	Trust	"Anders"	Dutch	15	19
68	03	Armenia	1	Arevik	"Erazanq" (Երազանք)	Armenian	2	136
69	04	Cyprus	4	Yiorgos Ioannides	"I mousiki dinei ftera" (Η μουσική δίνει φτερά)	Greek	14	29
70	05	Portugal	2	Jorge Leiria	"Só quero é cantar"	Portuguese	16	15
71	06	Russia	3	Alexandra Golovchenko	"Otlichnitsa" (Отличница)	Russian	6	105
72	07	Romania	5	4Kids	"Sha-la-la"	Romanian	10	54
73	08	Bulgaria	1	Bon-Bon	"Bonbolandiya" (Бонболандия)	Bulgarian	7	86
74	09	Serbia	2	Nevena Božović	"Piši mi" (Пиши ми)	Serbian	3	120
75	10	Netherlands	5	Lisa, Amy & Shelley	"Adem in, adem uit"	Dutch	11	39
76	11	Macedonia	5	Rosica Kulakova and Dimitar Stojmenovski	"Ding Ding Dong" (Динг Динг Донг)	Macedonian	5	111
77	12	Ukraine	2	Ilona Halytska	"Urok hlamuru" (Урок гламуру)	Ukrainian	9	56
78	13	Sweden	5	Frida Sandén	"Nu eller aldrig"	Swedish	8	83
79	14	Malta	5	Cute	"Music"	English	12	37
80	15	Greece	5	Made in Greece	"Kapou berdeftika" (Κάπου μπερδεύτηκα)	Greek	17 ◁	14
81	16	Lithuania	1	Lina Joy	"Kai miestas snaudžia"	Lithuanian	13	33
82	17	Belarus	5	Alexey Zhigalkovich	"S druz'yami" (С друзьями)	Russian	1	137
6th Junior Eurovision Song Contest 2008, Limassol, Cyprus
83	01	Romania	6	Mădălina and Andrada	"Salvați planeta!"	Romanian	9	58
84	02	Armenia	2	Monica	"Im Ergi Hnchyune" (Իմ Երգի Հնչյունե)	Armenian	8	59
85	03	Belarus	6	Dasha, Alina & Karyna	"Serdtse Belarusi" (Сердце Беларуси)	Russian, Belarusian	6	86
86	04	Russia	4	Mihail Puntov	"Spit angel" (Спит ангел)	Russian	7	73
87	05	Greece	6	Niki Yiannouchu	"Kapoia nychta" (Κάποια νύχτα)	Greek	14	19
88	06	Georgia	2	Bzikebi	"Bzz.."	None	1	154
89	07	Belgium	6	Oliver	"Shut Up"	Dutch	11	45
90	08	Bulgaria	2	Krastyana Krasteva	"Edna mechta" (Една мечта)	Bulgarian	15 ◁	15
91	09	Serbia	3	Maja Mazić	"Uvek kad u nebo pogledam" (Увек кaд у небо погледaм)	Serbian	12	37
92	10	Malta	6	Daniel Testa	"Junior Swing"	English	4	100
93	11	Netherlands	6	Marissa	"1 dag"	Dutch	13	27
94	12	Ukraine	3	Viktoria Petryk	"Matrosy" (Матроси)	Ukrainian	2	135
95	13	Lithuania	2	Eglė Jurgaitytė	"Laiminga diena"	Lithuanian	3	103
96	14	Macedonia	6	Bobi Andonov	"Prati mi SMS" (Прати ми СМС)	Macedonian	5	93
97	15	Cyprus	5	Elena Mannouri and Charis Savva	"Gioupi gia!" (Γιούπι για!)	Greek	10	46
7th Junior Eurovision Song Contest 2009, Kyiv, Ukraine
98	01	Sweden	6	Mimmi Sandén	"Du"	Swedish	6	68
99	02	Russia	5	Ekaterina Ryabova	"Malenkiy prints" (Маленький принц)	Russian	2	116
100	03	Armenia	3	Luara Hayrapetyan	"Barcelona" (Բարսելոնա)	Armenian	2	116
101	04	Romania	7	Ioana Anuța	"Ai puterea în mâna ta"	Romanian	13 ◁	19
102	05	Serbia	4	Ništa lično	"Onaj pravi" (Онаj прави)	Serbian, Croatian	10	34
103	06	Georgia	3	Princesses	"Lurji prinveli" (ლურჯი ფრინველი)	Georgian, English	6	68
104	07	Netherlands	7	Ralf Mackenbach	"Click Clack"	Dutch, English	1	121
105	08	Cyprus	6	Rafaella Kosta	"Thalassa, ilios, aeras, fotia" (Θάλασσα, ήλιος, αέρας, φωτιά)	Greek	11	32
106	09	Malta	7	Francesca & Mikaela	"Double Trouble"	English	8	55
107	10	Ukraine	4	Andranik Alexanyan	"Try topoli, try surmy" (Три тополі, три сурми)	Ukrainian	5	89
108	11	Belgium	7	Laura Omloop	"Zo verliefd (Yodelo)"	Dutch	4	113
109	12	Belarus	7	Yuriy Demidovich	"Volshebniy krolik" (Волшебный кролик)	Russian	9	48
110	13	Macedonia	7	Sara Markoska	"Za ljubovta" (За љубовта)	Macedonian	12	31
8th Junior Eurovision Song Contest 2010, Minsk, Belarus
111	01	Lithuania	3	Bartas	"Oki Doki"	Lithuanian	6	67
112	02	Moldova	1	Ștefan Roșcovan	"Ali Baba"	Romanian, English	8	54
113	03	Netherlands	8	Anna and Senna	"My Family"	Dutch, English	9	52
114	04	Serbia	5	Sonja Škorić	"Čarobna noć" (Чаробна ноћ)	Serbian	3	113
115	05	Ukraine	5	Yulia Gurska	"Miy litak" (Мій літак)	Ukrainian	14 ◁	28
116	06	Sweden	7	Josefine Ridell	"Allt jag vill ha"	Swedish	11	48
117	07	Russia	6	Sasha Lazin and Liza Drozd	"Boy and Girl"	Russian^{1}	2	119
118	08	Latvia	4	Šarlote Lēnmane	"Viva la Dance (Dejo tā)"	Latvian	10	51
119	09	Belgium	8	Jill and Lauren	"Get Up!"	Dutch, English	7	61
120	10	Armenia	4	Vladimir Arzumanyan	"Mama" (Մամա)	Armenian	1	120
121	11	Malta	8	Nicole Azzopardi	"Knock Knock!....Boom!Boom!"	English, Maltese	13	35
122	12	Belarus	8	Daniil Kozlov	"Muzyki svet" (Музыки свет)	Russian	5	85
123	13	Georgia	4	Mariam Kakhelishvili	"Mari Dari"	None	4	109
124	14	Macedonia	8	Anja Veterova	"Еооо, Еооо"	Macedonian	12	38
9th Junior Eurovision Song Contest 2011, Yerevan, Armenia
125	01	Russia	7	Katya Ryabova	"Romeo and Juliet"	Russian	4	99
126	02	Latvia	5	Amanda Bašmakova	"Moondog"	Latvian	13 ◁	31
127	03	Moldova	2	Lerika	"No, no"	Romanian, English	6	78
128	04	Armenia	5	Dalita	"Welcome to Armenia"	Armenian, English	5	85
129	05	Bulgaria	3	Ivan Ivanov	"Superhero"	Bulgarian	8	60
130	06	Lithuania	4	Paulina Skrabytė	"Debesys"	Lithuanian	10	53
131	07	Ukraine	6	Kristall	"Europe"	Ukrainian, English	11	42
132	08	Macedonia	9	Dorijan Dlaka	"Žimi ovoj frak"	Macedonian	12	31
133	09	Netherlands	9	Rachel	"Teenager"	Dutch	2	103
134	10	Belarus	9	Lidiya Zablotskaya	"Angely dobra" (Ангелы добра)	Russian	3	99
135	11	Sweden	8	Erik Rapp	"Faller"	Swedish	9	57
136	12	Georgia	5	Candy	"Candy Music"	Georgian	1	108
137	13	Belgium	9	Femke	"Een kusje meer"	Dutch	7	64
10th Junior Eurovision Song Contest 2012, Amsterdam, Netherlands
138	01	Belarus	10	Egor Zheshko	"A more-more" (А море-море)	Russian	9	56
139	02	Sweden	9	Lova Sönnerbo	"Mitt Mod"	Swedish	6	70
140	03	Azerbaijan	1	Omar & Suada	"Girls and Boys (Dünya Sənindir)"	Azerbaijani, English	11	49
141	04	Belgium	10	Fabian Feyaerts	"Abracadabra"	Dutch	5	72
142	05	Russia	8	Lerika	"Sensation"	Russian, English	4	88
143	06	Israel	1	Kids.il	"Let the Music Win"	Hebrew, English, French, Russian	8	68
144	07	Albania	1	Igzidora Gjeta	"Kam një këngë vetëm për ju"	Albanian	12 ◁	35
145	08	Armenia	6	Compass Band	"Sweetie Baby"	Armenian, English	3	98
146	09	Ukraine	7	Anastasiya Petryk	"Nebo" (Небо)	Ukrainian, English	1	138
147	10	Georgia	6	Funkids	"Funky Lemonade"	Georgian, English	2	103
148	11	Moldova	3	Denis Midone	"Toate vor fi"	Romanian, English	10	52
149	12	Netherlands	10	Femke	"Tik Tak Tik"	Dutch	7	69
11th Junior Eurovision Song Contest 2013, Kyiv, Ukraine
150	01	Sweden	10	Eliias	"Det är dit vi ska"	Swedish	9	46
151	02	Azerbaijan	2	Rustam Karimov	"Me and My Guitar"	Azerbaijani, English	7	66
152	03	Armenia	7	Monica Avanesyan	"Choco Factory"	Armenian, English	6	69
153	04	San Marino	1	Michele Perniola	"O-o-O Sole intorno a me"	Italian	10	42
154	05	Macedonia	10	Barbara Popović	"Ohrid i muzika"	Macedonian	12 ◁	19
155	06	Ukraine	8	Sofia Tarasova	"We Are One"	Ukrainian, English	2	121
156	07	Belarus	11	Ilya Volkov	"Poy so mnoy" (Пой со мной)	Russian	3	108
157	08	Moldova	4	Rafael Bobeica	"Cum să fim"	Romanian, English	11	41
158	09	Georgia	7	Smile Shop	"Give Me Your Smile"	Georgian, English	5	93
159	10	Netherlands	11	Mylène and Rosanne	"Double Me"	Dutch	8	59
160	11	Malta	9	Gaia Cauchi	"The Start"	English	1	130
161	12	Russia	9	Dayana Kirillova	"Dream On"	Russian, English	4	106
12th Junior Eurovision Song Contest 2014, Marsa, Malta
162	01	Belarus	12	Nadezhda Misyakova	"Sokal" (Сокал)	Belarusian	7	71
163	02	Bulgaria	4	Krisia, Hasan & Ibrahim	"Planet of the Children"	Bulgarian	2	147
164	03	San Marino	2	The Peppermints	"Breaking My Heart"	Italian, English	15	21
165	04	Croatia	5	Josie	"Game Over"	Croatian	16 ◁	13
166	05	Cyprus	7	Sophia Patsalides	"I pio omorfi mera" (Η πιο όμορφη μέρα)	Greek, English	9	69
167	06	Georgia	8	Lizi Pop	"Happy Day"	Georgian, English	11	54
168	07	Sweden	11	Julia Kedhammar	"Du är inte ensam"	Swedish	13	28
169	08	Ukraine	9	Sympho-Nick	"Spring Will Come"	Ukrainian, English	6	74
170	09	Slovenia	1	Ula Ložar	"Nisi sam (Your Light)"	Slovenian, English	12	29
171	10	Montenegro	1	Maša Vujadinović & Lejla Vulić	"Budi dijete na jedan dan"	Montenegrin, English	14	24
172	11	Italy	1	Vincenzo Cantiello	"Tu primo grande amore"	Italian, English	1	159
173	12	Armenia	8	Betty	"People of the Sun"	Armenian, English	3	146
174	13	Russia	10	Alisa Kozhikina	"Dreamer"	Russian, English	5	96
175	14	Serbia	6	Emilija Đonin	"Svet u mojim očima" (Свет у мојим очима)	Serbian	10	61
176	15	Malta	10	Federica Falzon	"Diamonds"	English	4	116
177	16	Netherlands	12	Julia van Bergen	"Around"	Dutch	8	70
13th Junior Eurovision Song Contest 2015, Sofia, Bulgaria
178	01	Serbia	7	Lena Stamenković	"Lenina pesma" (Ленина песма)	Serbian	7	79
179	02	Georgia	9	The Virus	"Gabede"	Georgian	10	51
180	03	Slovenia	2	Lina Kuduzović	"Prva ljubezen"	Slovenian, English	3	112
181	04	Italy	2	Chiara & Martina Scarpari	"Viva"	Italian	16	34
182	05	Netherlands	13	Shalisa	"Million Lights"	Dutch, English	15	35
183	06	Australia	1	Bella Paige	"My Girls"	English	8	64
184	07	Ireland	1	Aimee Banks	"Réalta na Mara"	Irish	12	36
185	08	Russia	11	Mikhail Smirnov	"Mechta" (Мечта)	Russian, English	6	80
186	09	Macedonia	11	Ivana & Magdalena	"Pletenka - Braid of Love"	Macedonian	17 ◁	26
187	10	Belarus	13	Ruslan Aslanov	"Volshebstvo" (Волшебство)	Russian	4	105
188	11	Armenia	9	Mika	"Love"	Armenian, English	2	176
189	12	Ukraine	10	Anna Trincher	"Pochny z sebe" (Почни з себе)	Ukrainian, English	11	38
190	13	Bulgaria	5	Gabriela Yordanova & Ivan Stoyanov	"Colour of Hope"	Bulgarian	9	62
191	14	San Marino	3	Kamilla Ismailova	"Mirror"	Italian, English	14	36
192	15	Malta	11	Destiny Chukunyere	"Not My Soul"	English	1	185
193	16	Albania	2	Mishela Rapo	"Dambaje"	Albanian, English	5	93
194	17	Montenegro	2	Jana Mirković	"Oluja"	Montenegrin	13	36
14th Junior Eurovision Song Contest 2016, Valletta, Malta
195	01	Ireland	2	Zena Donnelly	"Brice ar Bhricé"	Irish, English	10	122
196	02	Armenia	10	Anahit & Mary	"Tarber"	Armenian, English	2	232
197	03	Albania	3	Klesta Qehaja	"Besoj"	Albanian, English	13	38
198	04	Russia	12	The Water of Life Project	"The Water of Life"	Russian, English	4	202
199	05	Malta	12	Christina	"Parachute"	English	6	191
200	06	Bulgaria	6	Lidia Ganeva	"Magical Day"	Bulgarian, English	9	161
201	07	Macedonia	12	Martija Stanojković	"Love Will Lead Our Way"	Macedonian, English	12	41
202	08	Poland	3	Olivia Wieczorek	"Nie zapomnij"	Polish, English	11	60
203	09	Belarus	14	Aleksandr Minyonok	"Musyka moikh pobed (Music is My Only Way)"	Russian	7	177
204	10	Ukraine	11	Sofia Rol	"Planet Craves for Love"	Ukrainian, English	14	30
205	11	Italy	3	Fiamma Boccia	"Cara Mamma (Dear Mom)"	Italian	3	209
206	12	Serbia	8	Dunja Jeličić	"U la la la" (У ла ла ла)	Serbian	17 ◁	14
207	13	Israel	2	Shir & Tim	"Follow My Heart"	Hebrew, English	15	27
208	14	Australia	2	Alexa Curtis	"We Are"	English	5	202
209	15	Netherlands	14	Kisses	"Kisses and Dancin'"	Dutch, English	8	174
210	16	Cyprus	8	George Michaelides	"Dance Floor"	Greek, English	16	27
211	17	Georgia	10	Mariam Mamadashvili	"Mzeo"	Georgian	1	239
15th Junior Eurovision Song Contest 2017, Tbilisi, Georgia
212	01	Cyprus	9	Nicole Nicolaou	"I Wanna Be A Star"	Greek, English	16 ◁	45
213	02	Poland	4	Alicja Rega	"Mój Dom"	Polish	8	138
214	03	Netherlands	15	Fource	"Love Me"	Dutch, English	4	156
215	04	Armenia	11	Misha	"Boomerang"	Armenian, English	6	148
216	05	Belarus	15	Helena Meraai	"I Am The One"	Russian	5	149
217	06	Portugal	3	Mariana Venâncio	"Youtuber"	Portuguese	14	54
218	07	Ireland	3	Muireann McDonnell	"Súile Glasa"	Irish	15	54
219	08	Macedonia	13	Mina Blažev	"Dancing Through Life"	Macedonian, English	12	69
220	09	Georgia	11	Grigol Kipshidze	"Voice of the Heart"	Georgian	2	185
221	10	Albania	4	Ana Kodra	"Don't Touch My Tree"	Albanian, English	13	67
222	11	Ukraine	12	Anastasiya Baginska	"Don't Stop"	Ukrainian, English	7	147
223	12	Malta	13	Gianluca Cilia	"Dawra Tond"	English, Maltese	9	107
224	13	Russia	13	Polina Bogusevich	"Wings"	Russian, English	1	188
225	14	Serbia	9	Irina Brodić & Jana Paunović	"Ceo svet je naš" (Цео свет је наш)	Serbian	10	92
226	15	Australia	3	Isabella Clarke	"Speak Up"	English	3	172
227	16	Italy	4	Maria Iside Fiore	"Scelgo (My Choice)"	Italian, English	11	86
16th Junior Eurovision Song Contest 2018, Minsk, Belarus
228	01	Ukraine	13	Darina Krasnovetska	"Say Love"	Ukrainian, English	4	182
229	02	Portugal	4	Rita Laranjeira	"Gosto de Tudo (Já Não Gosto de Nada)"	Portuguese	18	42
230	03	Kazakhstan	1	Daneliya Tuleshova	"Ózińe sen" (Өзіңе сен)	Kazakh, English	6	171
231	04	Albania	5	Efi Gjika	"Barbie"	Albanian, English	17	44
232	05	Russia	14	Anna Filipchuk	"Unbreakable"	Russian, English	10	122
233	06	Netherlands	16	Max & Anne	"Samen"	Dutch, English	13	91
234	07	Azerbaijan	3	Fidan Huseynova	"I Wanna Be Like You"	Azerbaijani, English	16	47
235	08	Belarus	16	Daniel Yastremski	"Time"	Russian, English	11	114
236	09	Ireland	4	Taylor Hynes	"IOU"	Irish	15	48
237	10	Serbia	10	Bojana Radovanović	"Svet" (Свет)	Serbian	19	30
238	11	Italy	5	Melissa & Marco	"What Is Love"	Italian, English	7	151
239	12	Australia	4	Jael	"Champion"	English	3	201
240	13	Georgia	12	Tamar Edilashvili	"Your Voice"	Georgian	8	144
241	14	Israel	3	Noam Dadon	"Children Like These"	Hebrew, English	14	81
242	15	France	2	Angélina	"Jamais sans toi"	French, English	2	203
243	16	Macedonia	14	Marija Spasovska	"Doma" (Дома)	Macedonian	12	99
244	17	Armenia	12	L.E.V.O.N	"L.E.V.O.N"	Armenian	9	125
245	18	Wales	1	Manw	"Perta"	Welsh	20 ◁	29
246	19	Malta	14	Ela	"Marchin On"	English	5	181
247	20	Poland	5	Roksana Węgiel	"Anyone I Want To Be"	Polish, English	1	215
17th Junior Eurovision Song Contest 2019, Gliwice, Poland
248	01	Australia	5	Jordan Anthony	"We Will Rise"	English	8	121
249	02	France	3	Carla	"Bim bam toi"	French	5	169
250	03	Russia	15	Tatyana Mezhentseva and Denberel Oorzhak	"A Time for Us"	Russian, English	13	72
251	04	North Macedonia	15	Mila Moskov	"Fire"	Macedonian, English	6	150
252	05	Spain	5	Melani García	"Marte"	Spanish	3	212
253	06	Georgia	13	Giorgi Rostiashvili	"We Need Love"	Georgian, English	14	69
254	07	Belarus	17	Liza Misnikova	"Pepelny (Ashen)" (Пепельный)	Russian, English	11	92
255	08	Malta	15	Eliana Gomez Blanco	"We Are More"	English, Maltese	19 ◁	29
256	09	Wales	2	Erin Mai	"Calon yn Curo (Heart Beating)"	Welsh	18	35
257	10	Kazakhstan	2	Yerzhan Maksim	"Armanyńnan qalma" (Арманыңнан қалма)	Kazakh, English	2	227
258	11	Poland	6	Viki Gabor	"Superhero"	Polish, English	1	278
259	12	Ireland	5	Anna Kearney	"Banshee"	Irish	12	73
260	13	Ukraine	14	Sophia Ivanko	"The Spirit of Music"	Ukrainian, English	15	59
261	14	Netherlands	17	Matheu	"Dans met jou"	Dutch, English	4	186
262	15	Armenia	13	Karina Ignatyan	"Colours of Your Dream"	Armenian, English	9	115
263	16	Portugal	5	Joana Almeida	"Vem Comigo (Come with Me)"	Portuguese, English	16	43
264	17	Italy	6	Marta Viola	"La voce della terra"	Italian, English	7	129
265	18	Albania	6	Isea Çili	"Mikja ime fëmijëri"	Albanian	17	36
266	19	Serbia	11	Darija Vračević	"Podigni glas (Raise Your Voice)" (Подигни глас)	Serbian, English	10	109
18th Junior Eurovision Song Contest 2020, Warsaw, Poland
267	01	Germany	1	Susan	"Stronger With You"	German, English	12 ◁	66
268	02	Kazakhstan	3	Karakat Bashanova	"Forever"	Kazakh, English	2	152
269	03	Netherlands	18	Unity	"Best Friends"	Dutch, English	4	132
270	04	Serbia	12	Petar Aničić	"Heartbeat"	Serbian, English	11	85
271	05	Belarus	18	Arina Pehtereva	"Aliens"	Russian, English	5	130
272	06	Poland	7	Ala Tracz	"I'll Be Standing"	Polish, English	9	90
273	07	Georgia	14	Sandra Gadelia	"You Are Not Alone"	Georgian, English	6	111
274	08	Malta	16	Chanel Monseigneur	"Chasing Sunsets"	English	8	100
275	09	Russia	16	Sofia Feskova	"My New Day"	Russian, English	10	88
276	10	Spain	6	Soleá	"Palante"	Spanish	3	133
277	11	Ukraine	15	Oleksandr Balabanov	"Vidkryvai (Open Up)"	Ukrainian, English	7	106
278	12	France	4	Valentina	"J'imagine"	French	1	200
19th Junior Eurovision Song Contest 2021, Paris, France
279	01	Germany	2	Pauline	"Imagine Us"	German, English	17	61
280	02	Georgia	15	Niko Kajaia	"Let's Count the Smiles"	Georgian, English, French	4	163
281	03	Poland	8	Sara James	"Somebody"	Polish, English	2	218
282	04	Malta	17	Ike and Kaya	"My Home"	English	12	97
283	05	Italy	7	Elisabetta Lizza	"Specchio (Mirror on the Wall)"	Italian, English	10	107
284	06	Bulgaria	7	Denislava and Martin	"Voice of Love"	Bulgarian, English	16	77
285	07	Russia	17	Tatyana Mezhentseva	"Mon Ami"	Russian, English, French	7	124
286	08	Ireland	6	Maiú Levi Lawlor	"Saor (Disappear)"	Irish, English, French	18	44
287	09	Armenia	14	Maléna	"Qami Qami" (Քամի Քամի)	Armenian, English	1	224
288	10	Kazakhstan	4	Alinur Khamzin and Beknur Zhanibekuly	"Ertegı älemı (Fairy World)" (Ертегі әлемі)	Kazakh, French	8	121
289	11	Albania	7	Anna Gjebrea	"Stand By You"	Albanian, English	14	84
290	12	Ukraine	16	Olena Usenko	"Vazhil"	Ukrainian	6	125
291	13	France	5	Enzo	"Tic Tac"	French	3	187
292	14	Azerbaijan	4	Sona Azizova	"One of Those Days"	Azerbaijani, English	5	151
293	15	Netherlands	19	Ayana	"Mata Sugu Aō Ne" (またすぐ会おうね)	Dutch, English, Japanese	19 ◁	43
294	16	Spain	7	Levi Díaz	"Reír"	Spanish	15	77
295	17	Serbia	13	Jovana and Dunja	"Oči deteta (Children's Eyes)" (Очи Детета)	Serbian	13	86
296	18	North Macedonia	16	Dajte Muzika	"Green Forces"	Macedonian, English	9	114
297	19	Portugal	6	Simão Oliveira	"O Rapaz"	Portuguese	11	101
20th Junior Eurovision Song Contest 2022, Yerevan, Armenia
298	1	Netherlands	20	Luna	"La festa"	Dutch, English	7	128
299	2	Poland	9	Laura	"To the Moon"	Polish, English	10	95
300	3	Kazakhstan	5	David Charlin	"Jer-Ana (Mother Earth)" (Жер-Ана)	Kazakh, English	15	47
301	4	Malta	18	Gaia Gambuzza	"Diamonds in the Skies"	English	16 ◁	43
302	5	Italy	8	Chanel Dilecta	"Bla Bla Bla"	Italian, English	11	95
303	6	France	6	Lissandro	"Oh maman!"	French	1	203
304	7	Albania	8	Kejtlin Gjata	"Pakëz diell"	Albanian	12	94
305	8	Georgia	16	Mariam Bigvava	"I Believe"	Georgian, English	3	161
306	9	Ireland	7	Sophie Lennon	"Solas"	Irish	4	150
307	10	North Macedonia	17	Lara feat. Jovan and Irina	"Životot e pred mene" (Животот е пред мене)	Macedonian, English	14	54
308	11	Spain	8	Carlos Higes	"Señorita"	Spanish	6	137
309	12	United Kingdom	4	Freya Skye	"Lose My Head"	English	5	146
310	13	Portugal	7	Nicolas Alves	"Anos 70"	Portuguese	8	121
311	14	Serbia	14	Katarina Savić	"Svet bez granica" (Свет без граница)	Serbian	13	92
312	15	Armenia	15	Nare	"Dance!"	Armenian, English	2	180
313	16	Ukraine	17	Zlata Dziunka	"Nezlamna (Unbreakable)" (Незламна)	Ukrainian, English	9	111
21st Junior Eurovision Song Contest 2023, Nice, France
314	1	Spain	9	Sandra Valero	"Loviu"	Spanish	2	201
315	2	Malta	19	Yulan	"Stronger"	English	10	94
316	3	Ukraine	18	Anastasia Dymyd	"Kvitka" (Квітка)	Ukrainian, English	5	128
317	4	Ireland	8	Jessica McKean	"Aisling"	Irish	16 ◁	42
318	5	United Kingdom	5	STAND UNIQU3	"Back to Life"	English	4	160
319	6	North Macedonia	18	Tamara Grujeska	"Kaži mi, kaži mi koj" (Кажи ми, кажи ми кој)	Macedonian	12	76
320	7	Estonia	1	Arhanna	"Hoiame kokku"	Estonian, English	15	49
321	8	Armenia	16	Yan Girls	"Do It My Way"	Armenian, English	3	180
322	9	Poland	10	Maja Kryzyżewska	"I Just Need a Friend"	Polish, English	6	124
323	10	Georgia	17	Anastasia & Ranina	"Over the Sky"	Georgian, English	14	74
324	11	Portugal	8	Júlia Machado	"Where I Belong"	Portuguese, English	13	75
325	12	France	7	Zoé Clauzure	"Cœur"	French	1	228
326	13	Albania	9	Viola Gjyzeli	"Bota ime"	Albanian	8	115
327	14	Italy	9	Melissa & Ranya	"Un mondo giusto"	Italian, English	11	81
328	15	Germany	3	Fia	"Ohne Worte"	German	9	107
329	16	Netherlands	21	Sep and Jasmijn	"Holding on to You"	Dutch, English	7	122
22nd Junior Eurovision Song Contest 2024, Madrid, Spain
330	01	Italy	10	Simone Grande	"Pigiama party"	Italian, English	9	98
331	02	Estonia	2	Annabelle	"Tänavad"	Estonian	14	55
332	03	Albania	10	Nikol Çabeli	"Vallëzoj"	Albanian	7	126
333	04	Armenia	17	Leo	"Cosmic Friend"	Armenian, English	8	125
334	05	Cyprus	10	Maria Pissarides	"Crystal Waters"	Greek, English	13	60
335	06	France	8	Titouan	"Comme ci comme ça"	French	4	177
336	07	North Macedonia	19	Ana and Aleksej	"Marathon"	Macedonian, English	16	54
337	08	Poland	11	Dominik Arim	"All Together"	Polish, English	12	61
338	09	Georgia	18	Andria Putkaradze	"To My Mom"	Georgian	1	239
339	10	Spain	10	Chloe DelaRosa	"Como la Lola"	Spanish	6	144
340	11	Germany	4	Bjarne	"Save the Best for Us"	German, English	11	71
341	12	Netherlands	22	Stay Tuned	"Music"	Dutch, English	10	91
342	13	San Marino	4	Idols SM	"Come noi"	Italian	17 ◁	47
343	14	Ukraine	19	Artem Kotenko	"Hear Me Now"	Ukrainian, English	3	203
344	15	Portugal	9	Victoria Nicole	"Esperança"	Portuguese, Spanish	2	213
345	16	Ireland	9	Enya Cox Dempsey	"Le chéile"	Irish	15	55
346	17	Malta	20	Ramires Sciberras	"Stilla ċkejkna"	Maltese	5	153
23rd Junior Eurovision Song Contest 2025, Tbilisi, Georgia
347	01	Malta	21	Eliza Borg	"I Believe"	English	11	92
348	02	Azerbaijan	5	Yağmur	"Miau miau"	Azerbaijani, English	15	66
349	03	Croatia	6	Marino Vrgoč	"Snovi"	Croatian	14	70
350	04	San Marino	5	Martina Crv	"Beyond the Stars"	Italian, English	9	125
351	05	Armenia	18	Albert	"Brave Heart"	Armenian	4	175
352	06	Ukraine	20	Sofiia Nersesian	"Motanka" (Мотанка)	Ukrainian, English	2	177
353	07	Ireland	10	Lottie O'Driscoll Murray	"Rúin"	Irish	18 ◁	44
354	08	Netherlands	23	Meadow	"Freeze"	Dutch, English	10	93
355	09	Poland	12	Marianna Kłos	"Brightest Light"	Polish, English	8	139
356	10	North Macedonia	20	Nela Mančeska	"Miracle"	Macedonian, English	7	141
357	11	Montenegro	3	Asja Džogović	"I tužna i srećna priča" (И тужна и срећна прича)	Montenegrin	17	49
358	12	Italy	11	Leonardo Giovannangeli	"Rockstar"	Italian, English	12	73
359	13	Portugal	10	Inês Gonçalves	"Para onde vai o amor?"	Portuguese	13	73
360	14	Spain	11	Gonzalo Pinillos	"Érase una vez (Once Upon a Time)"	Spanish, English	5	152
361	15	Georgia	19	Anita Abgariani	"Shine Like a Star"	Georgian, English	3	176
362	16	Cyprus	11	Rafaella and Christos	"Away"	Greek, English	16	50
363	17	France	9	Lou Deleuze	"Ce monde"	French	1	248
364	18	Albania	11	Kroni Pula	"Fruta perime"	Albanian	6	145
24th Junior Eurovision Song Contest 2026, Ta' Qali, Malta
365	01	Netherlands	24	Maria	"Stronger Together"	Dutch, English	8	126
366	02	Cyprus	12	Harry Georgiou	"Who I Can Be"	Greek, English	10	98
367	03	Portugal	11	Salvador Rio	"Alma"	Portuguese	13	64
368	04	Montenegro	4	Mija Vujović	"Muzika nas spaja"(Музика нас спаја)	Montenegrin	12	68
369	05	San Marino	6	Violamarie	"Ruota panoramica"	Italian, English	4	148
370	06	France	10	Alec	"Comment tu vas?"	French	3	165
371	07	Poland	13	Wiktor Sas	"Gravity"	Polish, English	6	144
372	08	Armenia	19	Naré	"Boo!"	Armenian, English	1	202
373	09	Malta	22	Beppe	"Blue Bird"	English	7	136
374	10	Italy	12	Matteo Trullu	"Che cos'è l'amore?"	Italian	11	87
375	11	Ukraine	21	Erika Kolesnichenko	"Not a Lullaby"	Ukrainian, English	9	106
376	12	North Macedonia	21	Ana Stojanoska	"Idnata jas" (Идната јас)	Macedonian	16 ◁	57
377	13	Ireland	11	Caleb Kirwan and Naomi Gribben	"Níos láidre"	Irish	14	64
378	14	Albania	12	Eslin Kurti	"Kërce me mua"	Albanian	15	62
379	15	Georgia	20	Davit Lomidze	"Sun on the Rooftops"	Georgian	5	145
380	16	Spain	12	Lucas Paulano	"Cuore bello (te quiero, te quiero)"	Spanish	2	184

== Withdrawn entries ==
This list presents all the cases when a country withdrew or was disqualified from the contest.

Withdrawn Junior Eurovision Song Contest entries
Country	Year	Artist	Song	Language	Ref(s)
Cyprus	2005	Rena Kiriakidi	"Tsirko" (Τσίρκο)	Greek	
Armenia	2020	Maléna	"Why"	Armenian, English	

== See also ==
- List of Eurovision Song Contest entries
