= Latvia in the Junior Eurovision Song Contest 2004 =

- Junior Eurovision Song Contest 2004
- Country: Latvia
- Selection process: National final
- Selection date: 2 October 2004

Competing entry
- Song: "Balts vai melns"
- Artist: Mārtiņš Tālbergs and C-Stones Juniors
- Songwriter: Mārtiņš Tālbergs

Placement
- Final result: 17th, 3 points

Participation chronology

Latvia was represented at the Junior Eurovision Song Contest 2004 which took place on 20 November 2004, in Lillehammer, Norway. The Latvian broadcaster Latvijas Televīzija (LTV) organised a national final in order to select the Latvian entry for the 2004 contest. On 2 October 2004, Mārtiņš Tālbergs won the national final and was selected to represent Latvia with the song "Balts vai melns".

== Before Junior Eurovision ==
=== National final ===
Ten entries were selected for the national final, and the competing artists and songs were announced on 20 August 2004. One reserve entry was also chosen for the national final which was "Nejust neko" by Armīns Larks.

The final took place on 2 October 2004 at 18:30 CEST in the Jūras vārti Theatre in Ventspils and was broadcast on LTV1. The show was hosted by Rūta Reinika and Lauris Reiniks. Ten entries competed and the song with the highest number of votes from the public, "Balts vai melns" performed by Mārtiņš Tālbergs, was declared the winner. Guest performers in the final included C-Stones.

Final – 2 October 2004
R/O	Artist	Song	Televote	Place
1	Ilze Migliniece	"Tad, kad laukā lietus līst"	1,557	6
2	Miks Dukurs	"Mēs esam viens otram"	3,258	4
3	Evita Gržibovska	"Nāc dziedi, dejo līdz!"	4,667	2
4	Baiba Skudiķe	"Manis dēļ"	987	9
5	Sabīne Berezina	"Ir laiks"	775	10
6	Kristīna Zaharova	"Pārdomas"	995	8
7	Nadežda Maņkeviča	"Es vēlos"	1,287	7
8	Edgars Šmiukšis	"Meitenes dziesma"	2,158	5
9	Mārtiņš Tālbergs	"Balts vai melns"	6,317	1
10	Ralfs Eilands	"Dziesmiņa par mērkaķi"	3,557	3

== At Junior Eurovision ==
=== Voting ===
Points awarded to Latvia
Score	Country
12 points	
10 points	
8 points	
7 points	
6 points	
5 points	
4 points	
3 points	
2 points	Greece
1 point	Poland

Points awarded by Latvia
Score	Country
12 points	Romania
10 points	United Kingdom
8 points	Croatia
7 points	France
6 points	Spain
5 points	Netherlands
4 points	Denmark
3 points	Macedonia
2 points	Cyprus
1 point	Belarus
