= Cyprus in the Junior Eurovision Song Contest 2004 =

- Junior Eurovision Song Contest 2004
- Participating broadcaster: Cyprus Broadcasting Corporation (CyBC)
- Country: Cyprus
- Selection process: National final
- Selection date: 7 September 2004

Competing entry
- Song: "Onira"
- Artist: Marios Tofi
- Songwriter: Marios Tofi

Placement
- Final result: 8th, 61 points

Participation chronology

Cyprus was represented at the Junior Eurovision Song Contest 2004 with the song "Onira", written and performed by Marios Tofi. The Cypriot participating broadcaster, the Cyprus Broadcasting Corporation (CyBC), selected its entry for the contest through a national final for the first time.

== Before Junior Eurovision ==
=== National final ===
The Cyprus Broadcasting Corporation (CyBC) opened a submission window for the national final on 30 March 2004 and closed it on 30 June 2004. From the submission window, 54 submissions were received. The songs were evaluated by a 6-member jury on 26 July with ten finalists being chosen. The six-member jury consisted of Andri Tsavela, Dimitris Mouktaroudis, Katerina Christofidou, Kyriakos Pastides, Loukas Prastitis and Sofia Mouaimi. On the same day, the finalists were announced.

The final was originally supposed to be held on 13 September 2004 but was moved to 7 September 2004. The show was held in RIK Studio 3 at 20:00 CET and was broadcast on RIK 1 and RIK Sat. The show was hosted by Nikos Bogiatzis. The results were decided by 40% jury and 60% televoting. The jury in the final was the same but also it also consisted of Michalis Maniotis. A guest performance was done by Theodora Rafti opening the show with "Mia efhi" and Hi-5 performing during the interval.

Final – 7 September 2004
| R/O | Artist | Song | Songwriter(s) | Jury | Televote | Place |
| R/O | Artist | Song | Songwriter(s) | Place | Votes | Place |
|---|---|---|---|---|---|---|
| 1 | Nicole Paparistodemou | "Ena Latin se prokali" ("Ένα Λάτιν σε προκαλεί") | Nicole Paparistodemou | 4 | 1,994 | 5 |
| 2 | Marios Tofi | "Onira" ("Όνειρα") | Marios Tofi | 2 | 5,423 | 1 |
| 3 | Christodoula Tsaggara | "Thelo diakopes" ("Θέλω διακοπές") | Christodoula Tsaggara | 10 | 663 | 10 |
| 4 | Andreas Christoforou | "Tha se agapo" ("Θα σε αγαπώ") | Andreas Christoforou | 6 | 750 | 9 |
| 5 | Lorena-Kalliopi Konstantinou | "Kalimera sto mellon" ("Καλημέρα στο μέλλον") | Lorena-Kalliopi Konstantinou | 8 | 1,742 | 7 |
| 6 | Luis Panagiotis | "Gela Tragouda" ("Γέλα Τραγούδα") | Luis Panagiotis | 5 | 4,544 | 2 |
| 7 | Raphael Georgiou and Anna Loizou | "Doste ta cheria" ("Δώστε τα χέρια") | Raphael Georgiou; Anna Loizou | 3 | 2,639 | 3 |
| 8 | Stella Maria Koukkidi | "Afta pou chriazome" ("Αυτά που χρειάζομαι") | Stella Maria Koukkidi | 7 | 1,056 | 8 |
| 9 | Malvina Charalambidi and Kyriaki Athanasiou | "Party kalokairino" ("Πάρτυ καλοκαιρινό") | Malvina Charalambidi; Kyriaki Athanasiou | 9 | 2,547 | 6 |
| 10 | Georgia Panagi | "Bla, bla, bla" ("Μπλα, μπλα, μπλα") | Georgia Panagi | 1 | 1,193 | 4 |

== At Junior Eurovision ==
At the running order draw, Cyprus were drawn to perform ninth on 20 November 2004, following Poland and preceding Belarus.

=== Voting ===
Points awarded to Cyprus
| Score | Country |
|---|---|
| 12 points | Greece |
| 10 points | |
| 8 points | Malta; United Kingdom |
| 7 points | |
| 6 points | Macedonia |
| 5 points | Croatia; Romania Spain |
| 4 points | Belarus |
| 3 points | Netherlands |
| 2 points | Latvia |
| 1 point | Belgium; Denmark; Switzerland |

Points awarded by Cyprus
| Score | Country |
|---|---|
| 12 points | Greece |
| 10 points | Spain |
| 8 points | Romania |
| 7 points | Denmark |
| 6 points | Croatia |
| 5 points | United Kingdom |
| 4 points | France |
| 3 points | Macedonia |
| 2 points | Belgium |
| 1 point | Sweden |
