= Greece in the Junior Eurovision Song Contest 2004 =

- Junior Eurovision Song Contest 2004
- Participating broadcaster: Hellenic Broadcasting Corporation (ERT)
- Country: Greece
- Selection process: Eurovision Junior 2004
- Selection date: 26 September 2004

Competing entry
- Song: "O palios mou eaftos"
- Artist: Secret Band
- Songwriter: Andreas Kefalas

Placement
- Final result: 9th, 48 points

Participation chronology

Greece was represented at the Junior Eurovision Song Contest 2004 with the song "O palios mou eaftos", written by Andreas Kefalas, and performed by Secret Band. The Greek participating broadcaster, the Hellenic Broadcasting Corporation (ERT), selected its entry for the contest through a national final.

== Before Junior Eurovision ==
=== Eurovision Junior ===
By the submission window deadline set by the Hellenic Broadcasting Corporation (ERT), about a 100 entries were received, from which ten were selected as the finalists by a jury. The jury consisted of chairman Paschalis Avranitidis, Antonis Papas, Apostolia Zoi, Christos Hatzinasios, Fiona Tzavara, Petros Imvrios, and Stavros Papastavrou. The finalists were revealed on 19 July 2004 and the songs were released online on 23 July 2004.

The final took place on 26 September 2004 at 18:00 CEST in the ERT studios in Athens. The show was hosted by Giorgos Frantzeskakis. Guest performers included Apostolis Zoi, Breakers Without Fears, Christos Hatzinasios, Fiona Tzavara, Marios Tofi, Nicolas Ganopoulos, Paschalis Avranitdis and Petros Imvrios. The results were decided by 60% televoting and 40% jury.

Key: Winner Second place Third place

Final – 26 September 2004
R/O	Artist	Song	Songwriter(s)	Result
1	Sivilla Vasiadi and Giannis Chasapis	"I zoi synechizetai" ("Η ζωή συνεχίζεται")	Valeria Vasiadi	—N/a
2	Eleni Fragoulia	"Simera" ("Σήμερα")	Eleni Fragoulia	—N/a
3	Marianna Malantzi	"Ble tzin" ("Μπλε τζιν")	Marianna Malantzi	—N/a
4	Karolina Kountoupidou	"Ela kai chorepse mazi mas" ("Έλα και χόρεψε μαζί μας")	Stavroula Giannikopoulou	—N/a
5	Giorgos and Andreas	"O palios mou eaftos" ("Ο παλιός μου εαυτός")	Andreas Kefalas	1
6	Maria-Nefeli Papadaki	"Do-re-mi-fa-sol" ("Ντο-ρε-μη-φα-σολ")	Maria-Nefeli Papadaki	—N/a
7	Kalli Georgelli	"Tha pistefo s ena asteri" ("Θα πιστέφο σ' ένα αστέρι")	Alexandra-Kalliopi Georgelli	3
8	Alexandros Chountas	"Tha thela" ("Θα 'θελα")	Alexandros Chountas	—N/a
9	Sofia Koutsouri	"Akouse me" ("Άκουσε με")	Sofia Koutsouri	—N/a
10	Chloe Boleti	"Vima-vima" ("Βήμα-βήμα")	Chloe Boleti	2

=== Preparations ===
On 7 October 2004, it was announced that Giorgos and Andreas’ stage name in the Junior Eurovision Song Contest 2004 would be Secret Band.

== At Junior Eurovision ==
At the running order draw, Greece were drawn to perform first on 20 November 2004, preceding Malta.

=== Voting ===
Points awarded to Greece
Score	Country
12 points	Cyprus; Malta
10 points	
8 points	
7 points	
6 points	Romania
5 points	United Kingdom
4 points	
3 points	Croatia; France
2 points	Belgium; Switzerland
1 point	Netherlands; Norway; Spain

Points awarded by Greece
Score	Country
12 points	Cyprus
10 points	Spain
8 points	Romania
7 points	Denmark
6 points	France
5 points	United Kingdom
4 points	Croatia
3 points	Belgium
2 points	Latvia
1 point	Belarus
