= Belgium in the Junior Eurovision Song Contest 2004 =

- Junior Eurovision Song Contest 2004
- Participating broadcaster: Radio-télévision belge de la Communauté française (RTBF)
- Country: Belgium
- Selection process: Eurokids 2004
- Selection date: 26 September 2004

Competing entry
- Song: "Accroche-toi"
- Artist: Free Spirits
- Songwriters: Free Spirits

Placement
- Final result: 10th, 37 points

Participation chronology

Belgium was represented at the Junior Eurovision Song Contest 2004 with the song "Accroche-toi", written and performed by Free Spirits. The Belgian participating broadcaster, Radio-télévision belge de la Communauté française (RTBF), selected its entry for the contest through Eurokids 2004.

== Before Junior Eurovision ==
=== Eurokids 2004 ===
Radio-télévision belge de la Communauté française (RTBF) opened the submission window for Eurokids 2004 from 7 February until 2 April 2004. More than 260 entries were received by the deadline. 33 of the entries were selected for the auditions, from them ten semi-finalists were chosen.

The ten semi-finalists were revealed on 23 June 2004. Their songs were first presented to the public on 29 August 2004 between 13:00 and 14:00 CEST on VivaCité. The running order draw was done on the introduction show on 3 September 2004 at 20:25 CEST and broadcast on La Une and RTBF Sat. The common song was "Notre terre".

==== Format ====
Eurokids 2004 consisted of two semi-finals and one final. The results were decided by 1/4 kids jury, 1/4 jury of listeners of VivaCité and 2/4 televoting. In the final, a press jury also decided a part of the result. Each semi-final consisted of 5 participants.

Originally the winners of the semi-finals and the three best scoring entries in the semi-finals were supposed to qualify for the final. After the disqualification of Bess, it was decided that the three best scoring entries in each semi-final would qualify.

==== Semi-Finals ====
The semi-finals were held on 10 and 17 September 2004 and broadcast on La Une and RTBF Sat. Guest performers included T-Rio in Semi-Final 1 and Jenifer in Semi-Final 2.

On the day of the second Semi-Final, it was announced that Bess with "Laissez-les vivre" had been disqualified due to plagiarism with a song with the same title from 1991. Alex with "Écoute-moi" qualified to the final due to scoring more points than the third place in Semi-Final 1.

Qualifier
◇ Disqualified entry

Semi Final 1 – 10 September 2004
R/O	Artist	Song	Points	Place
1	B-Cocktail	"L'âge d'aimer"	33	5
2	Kevin	"J'ai envie"	37	4
3	Hotvibes	"Ma vraie identité"	41	3
4	Bess ◇	"Laissez-les vivre" ◇	45	1
5	Free Spirits	"Accroche-toi"	44	2

Semi Final 2 – 17 September 2004
R/O	Artist	Song	Points	Place
1	Alex	"Écoute-moi"	38	4
2	Julie	"Ma chance"	32	5
3	Manon	"Mais la vie"	40	3
4	Mary-Lo	"Laissez-moi rêver"	47	1
5	Methiola	"S'amuser"	43	2

==== Final ====
The Final was held on 26 September 2004 at 20:10 CEST and broadcast on La Une and RTBF Sat. The show was opened by Lorie with "Ensorcelée".

Winner

Final – 26 September 2004
R/O	Artist	Song	Points	Place
1	Free Spirits	"Accroche-toi"	56	1
2	Hotvibes	"Ma vraie identité"	47	4
3	Kevin	"J'ai envie"	30	7
4	Mary-Lo	"Laissez-moi rêver"	50	3
5	Methiola	"S'amuser"	52	2
6	Manon	"Mais la vie"	45	5
7	Alex	"Écoute-moi"	35	6

== At Junior Eurovision ==
At the running order draw, Belgium were drawn to perform seventeenth on 20 November 2004, following Sweden and preceding Romania.

=== Voting ===
Points awarded to Belgium
Score	Country
12 points	
10 points	
8 points	
7 points	France
6 points	
5 points	
4 points	Macedonia; Netherlands; Spain; Switzerland
3 points	Greece
2 points	Belarus; Croatia; Cyprus; Poland; Sweden
1 point	United Kingdom

Points awarded by Belgium
Score	Country
12 points	Spain
10 points	United Kingdom
8 points	France
7 points	Netherlands
6 points	Croatia
5 points	Romania
4 points	Denmark
3 points	Macedonia
2 points	Greece
1 point	Cyprus
