= Romania in the Junior Eurovision Song Contest 2004 =

- Junior Eurovision Song Contest 2004
- Participating broadcaster: Televiziunea Română (TVR)
- Country: Romania
- Selection process: Selecția Națională Eurovision Junior 2004
- Selection date: 25 September 2004

Competing entry
- Song: "Îți mulțumesc"
- Artist: Noni Răzvan Ene
- Songwriter: Noni Răzvan Ene

Placement
- Final result: 4th, 123 points

Participation chronology

Romania was represented at the Junior Eurovision Song Contest 2004 with the song "Îți mulțumesc", written and performed by Noni Răzvan Ene. The Romanian participating broadcaster, Televiziunea Română (TVR), selected its entry for the contest through Selecția Națională Eurovision Junior 2004.

== Before Junior Eurovision ==
=== Selecția Națională Eurovision Junior 2004 ===
By the submission window deadline, Televiziunea Română (TVR) had received 21 entries, which seven of them were disqualified. All of the submissions were revealed on 9 August 2004. A jury judged the entries and selected ten finalists between 16 and 20 August. The ten finalists were revealed on 7 September 2004, along with their songs being released.

The final took place on 25 September 2004 and was broadcast on TVR 1. The show was hosted by Alina Sorescu. The results were decided by a jury and televoting. The jury consisted of Andreea Andrei, Liana Ekeles, Lucia Dumitrescu, Mihai Alexandru and Mihai Ogasanu. The running order is unknown except that Giulia Silvestru with "Liniște" performed tenth.

Key: Winner Second place Third place

Final – 25 September 2004
Artist	Song	Result
Alexandru Petcu	"Tot ce-mi doresc"	—N/a
Ana-Maria Deliu	"Țarina de la Turda"	—N/a
Dana Gabriela Mareș	"Vreau să fiu artistă"	—N/a
Giulia Silvestru	"Liniște"	2
Lara Popescu and Alexandru Matios	"Asta e vacanța"	—N/a
Matei Tibacu-Blendea	"Reacție în lanț"	—N/a
Noni Răzvan Ene	"Îți mulțumesc"	1
Patricia Matei	"Eu sent speranța" (Note: Originally titled "Copii viitorului")	3
Raluca Paraschiv	"Cântecul meu"	—N/a
Răzvan Dumitru	"Corabia de vise"	—N/a

== At Junior Eurovision ==
At the running order draw, Romania were drawn to perform last on 20 November 2004, following Belgium.

=== Voting ===
TVR received 1,256 votes in total from the televoting for the Junior Eurovision Song Contest 2004.

Points awarded to Romania
Score	Country
12 points	Belarus; Latvia; Spain
10 points	Croatia; France; Switzerland
8 points	Cyprus; Greece
7 points	Macedonia; Norway
6 points	Poland; Sweden; United Kingdom
5 points	Belgium
4 points	
3 points	
2 points	Denmark; Malta
1 point	

Points awarded by Romania
Score	Votes	Country
12 points	415	Spain
10 points	146	United Kingdom
8 points	108	Denmark
7 points	88	Croatia
6 points	70	Greece
5 points	64 (Note: Cyprus got more points due to having a higher ranking by the backup jury)	Cyprus
4 points	64	Belarus
3 points	57	France
2 points	55	Macedonia
1 point	46	Malta
