= Sunrise in Baku Fashion Project =

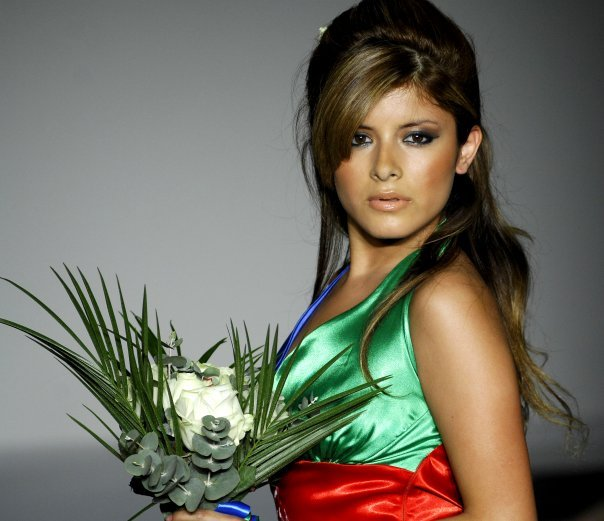
- Sunrise in Baku Fashion Project was organised in the aid of ABC Trust Foundation
- Date: 28 February 2009
- Location: The Mayfair, London
- Country: United Kingdom
- Presented by: KPK Entertainment Group

Sunrise in Baku was an international fashion project held on 28 February 2009 in London, England. The project was part of a series of philanthropic events organised by KPK Entertainment Group in the United Kingdom and aimed to raise funds and awareness for the UK-based charity organisation ABC Trust Foundation – Action for Children of Brazil. The initiative, whose proceedings contributed towards the establishment of a primary school in Brazil, was supported by Azerbaijan Embassy, Brazil Embassy and the High Commission of Cyprus in London.

The fashion project involved young rising designers from a number of countries, including Azerbaijan, Ukraine, Russia, Italy and the United Arab Emirates. The Azerbaijani collection reflecting the national flag of Azerbaijan (see photo) under Azeri national music was inspired by the name of the fashion project. The collection, presented by Ramina Mavadin Huseynova, formed the culmination of the catwalk show during the night.

Cyprus High Commission's Cultural Counsellor Dr. Niki Katsaouni mentioned on her speech: 'This is a great evening organised by two young ladies, Kamila Mavadin Huseynova from Azerbaijan and Katerina Gavrielidou from Cyprus, founders of KPK Entertainment Group, a nonprofit organization that has already a background of philanthropic contribution in Britain. I would like to express my support to initiatives like this which enhance the cultural cooperation between young people from different countries. It is remarkable how two small countries like Azerbaijan and Cyprus worked together towards the common good, tonight dedicated to the children of Brazil'.

The project attracted the interest of international media such as Fashion TV (Europe, USA and the Middle East), BBC Azeri, London Greek Radio, MTV, Hellenic TV, and Sigma Live.

ABC Trust Foundation was chosen by KPK Entertainment Group as the sole beneficiary charity foundation for Sunrise in Baku Fashion Project. Action for Brazil's Children Foundation is dedicated to helping the most vulnerable children and young people of Brazil. By raising awareness and funding, ABC Trust supports the work of local, community-led organisations who give children the education, support and inspiration they need to transform their lives. ABC Trust is a UK-based organisation set up by Jimena Page, as Founding Trustee, and Led Zeppelin legend Jimmy Page, as Founding Patron. They have since been joined by a board of trustees and a group of Patrons who lend a hand whenever possible.

KPK Entertainment Group is an international non-profit organisation founded under the leadership of Kamila Mavadin Huseynova in November 2007. KPK Entertainment holds annual summits that bring together young talented individuals to work on new projects and develop new ideas for the support of different charity foundations across the globe. The events of KPK Entertainment Group are the platform for young designers, singers, and artists to demonstrate their talents. Among them are fashion designers Yuliya Polishchuk, Mona Hamid, singers Marios Tofi, Heidi Anne Burford, artists Karim Theilgaard, Krish Nightstar, model Claudia Camarena and many others.
