= Netherlands in the Junior Eurovision Song Contest 2004 =

- Junior Eurovision Song Contest 2004
- Participating broadcaster: Algemene Vereniging Radio Omroep (AVRO)
- Country: Netherlands
- Selection process: Junior Songfestival 2004
- Selection date: 25 September 2004

Competing entry
- Song: "Hij is een kei"
- Artist: Klaartje and Nicky
- Songwriters: Nicky Bruin; Klaartje Meulemeester

Placement
- Final result: 11th, 27 points

Participation chronology

The Netherlands was represented at the Junior Eurovision Song Contest 2004 with the song "Hij is een kei", written by Nicky Bruin and Klaartje Meulemeester, and performed by themselves as Klaartje and Nicky. The Dutch participating broadcaster, Algemene Vereniging Radio Omroep (AVRO), selected its entry for the contest through a national selection called Junior Songfestival 2004.

== Before Junior Eurovision ==
=== Junior Songfestival 2004 ===
The submission window was originally supposed to end on 14 April 2004 but due to enormous interest, the deadline was extended to 16 April 2004. By the deadline, AVRO received over 1000 submissions.

From the submissions, 45 acts were selected to the auditions that took place on 14 and 15 May 2004. On 14 July 2004, the participants of Junior Songfestival 2004 were revealed during a press conference in Six Flags Holland.

The host of Junior Songfestival 2004 was Angela Groothuizen. The adult jury consisted of Angela Schijf, Carlo Boszhard, Jeroen Kijk in de Vegte, and Manuela Kemp. This was the first Junior Songfestival to also have a common song which was “Wij gaan eervoor”.

==== Format ====
Junior Songfestival 2004 consisted of two semi finals and one final. Each semi-final had 5 participants and two participants would qualify to the final. The results were decided by 1/3 adult jury, 1/3 kids jury and 1/3 televoting. The final was originally supposed to have 4 participants

==== Semi-Finals ====
The semi-finals were held on 11 and 18 September 2004 in Studio 23 at Media Park, Hilversum and was broadcast on Nederland 2 at 19:55 CET. At the first semi final, the host accidentally announced the 3rd place, Klaartje and Nicky as the qualifiers, which was supposed to be Marnix. After it was revealed that Marnix was supposed to qualify, in order not to disappoint Klaartje and Nicky, the professional jury let them qualify to the final.

Semi Final 1 – 11 September 2004
R/O	Artist	Song	Kids jury	Adult jury	Televoting	Total	Place	Result
1	Four Stars	"Hoi"	6	7	8	21	4	—N/a
2	Marnix	"Het allergrootste hart"	10	10	7	27	2	Qualified
3	Klaartje and Nicky	"Hij is een kei"	7	8	10	25	3	Qualified (Note: Originally supposed to be eliminated.)
4	Shakira	"Dansen in Afrika"	12	12	12	36	1	Qualified
5	Lorrèn	"Alles wat je kan"	8	6	6	20	5	—N/a

Semi Final 2 – 18 September 2004
R/O	Artist	Song	Kids jury	Adult jury	Televoting	Total	Place	Result
1	Anouk	"Over en uit"	12	12	10	34	1	Qualified
2	Danny	"Van zingen word ik blij"	6	10	12	28	2	Qualified
3	Denise	"Jungle beat"	8	6	7	21	5	—N/a
4	Four Flying Elements	"Zo is het leven"	10	8	6	24	3	—N/a
5	Kika	"Dansen"	7	7	8	22	4	—N/a

==== Final ====
The final was held on 25 September 2004 at Pepsi Stage in Amsterdam and was broadcast on Nederland 2 at 19:25 CET.

Final – 25 September 2004
R/O	Artist	Song	Kids jury	Adult jury	Televoting	Total	Place
1	Klaartje and Nicky	"Hij is een kei"	10	12	10	32	1
2	Anouk	"Over en uit"	12	10	7	29	2
3	Danny	"Van zingen word ik blij"	6	6	12	24	3
4	Shakira	"Dansen in Afrika"	8	8	8	24	4
5	Marnix	"Het allergrootste hart"	7	7	6	19	5

== At Junior Eurovision ==
At the running order draw, the Netherlands were drawn to perform third on 20 November 2004, following Malta and preceding Switzerland.

=== Voting ===
Points awarded to the Netherlands
Score	Country
12 points	
10 points	
8 points	
7 points	Belgium
6 points	
5 points	Latvia
4 points	
3 points	Belarus; Malta; Norway
2 points	Spain
1 point	Croatia; France; Macedonia; Sweden

Points awarded by the Netherlands
Score	Country
12 points	United Kingdom
10 points	Spain
8 points	Croatia
7 points	Denmark
6 points	Macedonia
5 points	France
4 points	Belgium
3 points	Cyprus
2 points	Malta
1 point	Greece
