= Marilena Gauci =

Maltese politician (born 1991)

Member of the Parliament of Malta
- Incumbent
- Assumed office 20 June 2026

Personal details
- Born: 20 October 1991 (age 35)
- Party: Nationalist Party

Marilena Gauci (born 20 October 1991) is a Maltese politician serving as a member of the Parliament of Malta since 2026. She has served as spokesperson for the film industry of the Nationalist Party since 2026. In 2004, Gauci represented Malta in the Junior Eurovision Song Contest, and in 2009, she won the Alexandria Song & Music Festival in Egypt. She participated in the Maltese national selections for the Eurovision Song Contest in 2011 and 2013. In 2017, she auditioned for The X Factor UK, and in 2018, she placed third in Miss Universe Malta. In 2024, Gauci was appointed vice president of the Malta Entertainment Industry and Arts Association.
