= Lists of Eurovision Song Contest entries =

These are the lists of Eurovision Song Contest entries:

- List of Eurovision Song Contest entries (1956–2003)
- List of Eurovision Song Contest entries (2004–present)
- List of Junior Eurovision Song Contest entries

== See also ==
- List of Eurovision Song Contest winners
