= Yuliya Polishchuk =

Ukrainian artist (born 1983)

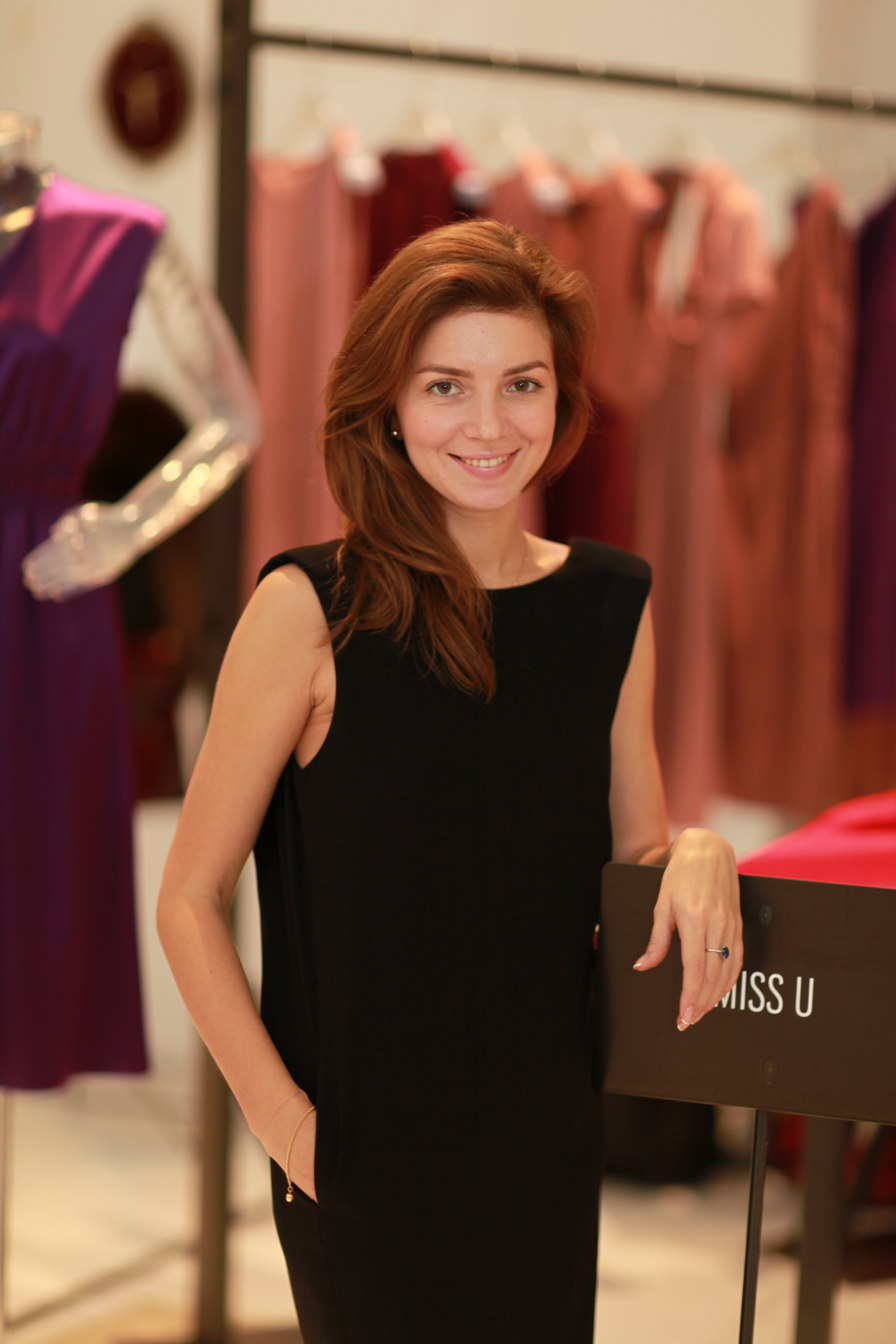
- Taken at White Milano Show
- Born: 14 March 1983 (age 43); Kyiv, Ukraine
- Education: University of the Arts, London
- Occupation: Fashion designer
- Known for: MissU, Yuliya Polishchuk, Fashion Move On
- Labels: MissU, Yuliya Polishchuk
- Website: yuliyapolishchuk.com

Yuliya Polishchuk (Ukrainian: Юлія Поліщук; born 14 March 1983) is a London-based fashion designer who was born in Ukraine.

== Career ==
Polishchuk launched MissU in 2012. In March 2013, she released a new line of evening dresses under her own name and received attention from fashion critics in Ukraine.

Polishchuk became a resident of the Ukrainian Fashion Week in Kyiv in March 2012. Her portfolio includes two fashion labels. The MissU trademark caters to young women and features designs intended to be mischievous and thoughtful, careless and serious, but at the same time both feminine and romantic. In contrast, the self-titled Yuliya Polishchuk brand is dedicated to evening dresses designed to convey a charming, elegant style for confident and successful women.

Yuliya's work was presented for the first time in February 2009, during Sunrise in Baku Fashion Project. The fashion project was broadcast for a month on Fashion TV (Europe, America and Middle East), BBC Azeri, and MTV, and Yuliya's work attracted much of the spotlight during the show.

== Other activities ==
Yuliya Polishchuk actively supports education and student programs in the fashion industry, and regularly delivers lectures at universities in London and Kyiv. Recently, the designer initiated Fashion Move On, a unique art project that she run in partnership with the Ukrainian Fashion Week. The project was created to support and develop collaborations between designers, filmmakers and contemporary artists. The collaboration occurred in the form of short films that were officially presented to the press and public during the Ukrainian Fashion Week.
