= United Kingdom in the Junior Eurovision Song Contest 2004 =

- Junior Eurovision Song Contest 2004
- Participating broadcaster: ITV
- Country: United Kingdom
- Selection process: Junior Eurovision Song Contest: The British Final
- Selection date: 4 September 2004

Competing entry
- Song: "The Best Is Yet to Come"
- Artist: Cory Spedding
- Songwriter: Cory Spedding

Placement
- Final result: 2nd, 140 points

Participation chronology

The United Kingdom was represented at the Junior Eurovision Song Contest 2004, with the song "The Best Is Yet to Come", written and performed by Cory Spedding. The British participating broadcaster, ITV, organised a national final to select its entry for the contest.

The British entry was selected to perform thirteenth in the running order, following the entry from Latvia and preceding the entry from Denmark. It finished in second position with 140 points, which remains the UK's highest placing in the Junior Eurovision Song Contest as of 2023.

== Before Junior Eurovision ==
=== Junior Eurovision Song Contest 2004: The British Final ===
A national final was held by ITV to select its entry for the Junior Eurovision Song Contest 2004. The final, broadcast on digital channel ITV2, was held on 4 September 2004 at the Granada Studios in Manchester and was presented by Holly Willoughby, Stephen Mulhern and Michael Underwood. Regional televoting was held to select the winner from the eight competing acts.

Final – 4 September 2004
R/O	Artist	Song	Points	Place
1	Samantha Seth	"Rockstar Wannabe"	17	7
2	Kirsty Williams	"Sunshine"	29	4
3	Nathan Sykes	"Born to Dance"	34	3
4	Charlie Allan	"One in a Crowd"	17	7
5	Loaded Dice	"Dill"	24	5
6	Jessica Hamilton	"Because of You"	19	6
7	Andrew Merry	"Together Again"	46	2
8	Cory Spedding	"The Best is Yet to Come"	48	1

Detailed regional televoting results
R/O	Song	Regional televoting					UK Text & Mobile	Total
R/O	Song	South England	Scotland	Northern Ireland	North England	Wales	UK Text & Mobile	Total
1	"Rockstar Wannabe"	1	8	1	2	2	3	17
2	"Sunshine"	5	5	6	8	3	2	29
3	"Born to Dance"	10	1	5	5	8	5	34
4	"One in a Crowd"	3	4	2	3	1	4	17
5	"Dill"	6	3	4	1	4	6	24
6	"Because of You"	2	2	3	6	5	1	19
7	"Together Again"	4	10	10	4	10	8	46
8	"The Best is Yet to Come"	8	6	8	10	6	10	48

== At Junior Eurovision ==
The Eurovision Song Contest 2004 was initially to be held in Manchester. However, ITV abandoned the project due to finance and scheduling problems. It was therefore moved to Lillehammer in Norway.

On the night of the contest, Cory Spedding performed 13th in the running order of the contest, following Latvia and preceding Denmark. At the close of the voting Cory received 140 points, placing 2nd of the 18 competing entries, beaten by María Isabel of Spain.

In the United Kingdom, the show was televised on digital channel ITV2 (due to poor viewing figures the previous year) with commentary by Matt Brown. The British spokesperson, who announced the British votes during the final, was national finalist Charlie Allan. A delayed broadcast, consisting of highlights, was aired on ITV1 the following afternoon.

=== Voting ===
Points awarded to the United Kingdom
Score	Country
12 points	Netherlands
10 points	Belarus; Belgium; Denmark; Latvia; Malta; Poland; Romania; Spain
8 points	
7 points	Croatia; Sweden; Switzerland
6 points	France; Norway
5 points	Cyprus; Greece; Macedonia
4 points	
3 points	
2 points	
1 point	

Points awarded by the United Kingdom
Score	Country
12 points	Croatia
10 points	Denmark
8 points	Cyprus
7 points	Spain
6 points	Romania
5 points	Greece
4 points	Malta
3 points	Macedonia
2 points	France
1 point	Belgium
