= Macedonia in the Junior Eurovision Song Contest 2004 =

- Junior Eurovision Song Contest 2004
- Participating broadcaster: Macedonian Radio Television (MRT)
- Country: Macedonia
- Selection process: Evrosong 2004 Za Deca
- Selection date: 26 June 2004

Competing entry
- Song: "Zabava"
- Artist: Martina Siljanovska
- Songwriter: Martina Siljanovska

Placement
- Final result: 7th, 64 points

Participation chronology

Macedonia (Note: Presented under the provisional appellation "former Yugoslav Republic of Macedonia", abbreviated "FYR Macedonia".) was represented at the Junior Eurovision Song Contest 2004 with the song "Zabava", written and performed by Martina Siljanovska. The Macedonian participating broadcaster, Macedonian Radio Television (MRT), organised a national final to select its entry for the contest.

== Before Junior Eurovision ==
=== Evrosong 2004 Za Deca ===
By the deadline, 10 songs were received, which all of the songs qualified for the final.

The final was held on 26 June 2004 in Studio 3 of MRT at 20:30 CET. There were 10 participants and the results were decided by 50% five-member jury and 50% televoting.

Key: Winner Second place

Final - 26 June 2004
| R/O | Artist | Song | Place |
|---|---|---|---|
| 1 | Ljubinka Petruševska | "Na vrata tropa ljubovta" ("На врата тропа љубовта") | —N/a |
| 2 | Elena Dimovska | "Ako dojde kraj" ("Ако дојде крај") | —N/a |
| 3 | Gligor Dinev, Eva Hristovska, Ruben Jusuf, Veronika Šijak and Elena Jovanovska | "Gradski fraer" ("Градски фраер") | 2 |
| 4 | Martina Siljanovska | "Zabava" ("Забава") | 1 |
| 5 | Marija Pavlovska | "Doždot" ("Дождот") | —N/a |
| 6 | Irana Atanasovska and Bojdan Smilevski | "Nema što da krieme" ("Нема што да криеме") | —N/a |
| 7 | Robert Mitrov | "Te sonuvam" ("Те сонувам") | —N/a |
| 8 | Gordana Monevska | "Osamena" ("Осамена") | —N/a |
| 9 | Ivet Caro and Orhideja Dukovska | "Angel čuvar" ("Ангел чувар") | —N/a |
| 10 | Stefani Brzanova | "Gulapče" ("Гулапче") | —N/a |

== At Junior Eurovision ==
At the running order draw, Macedonia was drawn to perform seventh on 20 November 2004, following France and preceding Poland.

=== Voting ===
Points awarded to Macedonia
| Score | Country |
|---|---|
| 12 points (Note: All countries received one set of 12 points to ensure no country finished with nul points.) | |
| 10 points | |
| 8 points | Croatia |
| 7 points | |
| 6 points | Malta Netherlands |
| 5 points | Denmark Norway Poland Switzerland |
| 4 points | France |
| 3 points | Belgium Cyprus Latvia Spain Sweden United Kingdom |
| 2 points | Romania |
| 1 point | |

Points awarded by Macedonia
| Score | Country |
|---|---|
| 12 points | Croatia |
| 10 points | Spain |
| 8 points | Denmark |
| 7 points | Romania |
| 6 points | Cyprus |
| 5 points | United Kingdom |
| 4 points | Belgium |
| 3 points | Malta |
| 2 points | France |
| 1 point | Netherlands |
