= France in the Junior Eurovision Song Contest 2004 =

- Junior Eurovision Song Contest 2004
- Participating broadcaster: France Télévisions
- Country: France
- Selection process: Artist: Eurovision Junior 2004 — La sélection Song: Internal selection
- Selection date: Artist: 20 September 2004; Song: 9 November 2004

Competing entry
- Song: "Si on voulait bien"
- Artist: Thomas Pontier
- Songwriter: Thomas Pontier

Placement
- Final result: 6th, 78 points

Participation chronology

France was represented at the Junior Eurovision Song Contest 2004 with the song "Si on voulait bien", written and performed by Thomas Pontier. The French participating broadcaster, France Télévisions, selected its representative through a national final called Eurovision Junior 2004 — La sélection, while the song was selected internally. This was the first-ever entry from France in the Junior Eurovision Song Contest.

== Before Junior Eurovision ==
=== Eurovision Junior 2004 — La sélection ===
France Télévisions held the casting sessions for the national final on 26 August in Marseille and 27 August 2004 in Lille. On 12 September 2004, the 11 finalists of the national final were announced. Christopher was in the original list but wasn’t in the national final due to unknown reasons.

The national final was held on 20 September 2004 at 20:55 CET and broadcast on France 3. The national final was hosted by Pierre Sled and Sophie Davant. In the first round, the 11 finalists sang songs of their choice and three of them were chosen to the second round by 50% professional jury and 50% televoting.

==== First Round ====
First Round – 20 September 2004
R/O	Artist	Song (Original artist)	Result
1	Cindy	"Rue de la paix" (Zazie)	—N/a
2	Joris	"J’irais au bout de me revês" (Jean Jacques Goldman)	—N/a
3	Lucie	"Mon manège à moi" (Edith Piaf)	—N/a
4	Julian and Marine	"J’ai demandé à la lune" (Indochine)	—N/a
5	Julien	"Suzette" (Dany Brillant)	—N/a
6	Les J.A.M.M.E.	"Fan" (Pascal Obispo)	—N/a
7	Julie	"Il y a trop de gens qui t’aiment" (Hélène Ségara)	Qualified
8	Tiffanie	"La gadoue" (Petula Clark)	—N/a
9	Thomas	"Un autre monde" (Téléphone)	Qualified
10	Axelle	"Le monde est stone" (Fabienne Thibault)	Qualified
11	Marion and Julia	"Les brunes comptent pas pour des prunes" (Lio)	—N/a

In the second round, the second round qualifiers had to sing another song in acapella and the winner was chosen by 50% professional jury and 50% televoting.

==== Second Round ====
Second Round – 20 September 2004
R/O	Artist	Song (Original artist)
1	Thomas	"Amsterdam" (Jacques Brel)
2	Julie	"Mrs Jones" (Hélène Ségara)
3	Axelle	"L’hymne à l’amour" (Edith Piaf)

=== Song selection ===
On 7 October 2004, it was revealed that Thomas would sing "Si on voulait bien" which was written by himself. His song was released on 9 November 2004.

== At Junior Eurovision ==
At the running order draw, France were drawn to perform sixth on 20 November 2004, following Norway and preceding Macedonia.

=== Voting ===
Points awarded to France
Score	Country
12 points	
10 points	
8 points	Belgium Spain
7 points	Latvia
6 points	Belarus Denmark Greece Switzerland
5 points	Netherlands
4 points	Croatia Cyprus Poland Sweden
3 points	Romania
2 points	Macedonia Norway United Kingdom
1 point	Malta

Points awarded by France
Score	Country
12 points	Spain
10 points	Romania
8 points	Croatia
7 points	Belgium
6 points	United Kingdom
5 points	Denmark
4 points	Macedonia
3 points	Greece
2 points	Poland
1 point	Netherlands
