= Malta in the Junior Eurovision Song Contest 2004 =

- Junior Eurovision Song Contest 2004
- Participating broadcaster: Public Broadcasting Services (PBS)
- Country: Malta
- Selection process: Junior Song For Europe 2004
- Selection date: 24 September 2004

Competing entry
- Song: "Power of a Song"
- Artist: Young Talent Team
- Songwriters: Charlotte Debattista; Marilena Gauci

Placement
- Final result: 12th, 14 points

Participation chronology

Malta was represented at the Junior Eurovision Song Contest 2004 with the song "Power of a Song", written by Charlotte Debattista and Marilena Gauci, and performed by themselves as Young Talent Team. The Maltese participating broadcaster, Public Broadcasting Services (PBS), selected its entry for the contest through the national final Junior Song For Europe 2004, being held on 24 September 2004. The song finished 12th with 14 points.

== Before Junior Eurovision ==
=== Junior Song For Europe 2004 ===
The Public Broadcasting Services (PBS) opened the submission window for Junior Song For Europe 2004 on 28 June 2004 and closed it on 28 July 2004. By the deadline, 118 entries were received. The first elimination round took place on 9 and 10 August 2004 at the Golden Tulip Vivaldi Hotel in St. Julian's. The second elimination round took place on 18 August 2004, where the sixteen finalists were chosen.

The final took place on 24 September 2004 at 20:30 CEST in the Sir Temi Zammit Hall in University of Malta and was broadcast on TVM. Guest performers included Julie and Ludwig with "On Again... Off Again", and Sarah Harrison with "Some Girls", "The Show" and "The Voice Within". Young Talent Team won the national final with just one point in front of the runner-up Dario Bezzina. The winner was selected by 60% professional jury and 40% televoting.

Junior Song For Europe 2004 – 24 September 2004
R/O	Artist	Song	Songwriter(s)	Jury	Televote	Total	Place
1	Kylie Coleiro	"Because We R Friends"	Kylie Coleiro	37	4	41	15
2	Jessica Muscat	"Precious Time"	Jessica Muscat	27	12	39	16
3	Yazmin and Sophie	"The Magic Window"	Yazmin; Sophie	68	48	116	6
4	Thea Saliba	"Say 'No'"	Thea Saliba	65	28	93	7
5	Klinsmann Coleiro	"Warzone Children"	Klinsmann Coleiro	89	32	121	4
6	Leanne Ellul	"Colours of Love"	Leanne Ellul	60	16	76	10
7	Young Talent Team	"Power of a Song"	Charlotte Debattista; Marilena Gauci	73	80	153	1
8	Domenique Azzopardi	"Talk To Me"	Domenique Azzopardi	43	44	87	8
9	Yanika Fava	"Dream"	Yanika Fava	72	8	80	9
10	Brooke Borg	"Come Over"	Brooke Borg	23	40	63	13
11	Christabelle Borg	"One Way Journey"	Christabelle Borg; Giselle Spiteri	57	64	121	3
12	Maronia Gafa'	"Shalom"	Maronia Gafa'	34	20	54	14
13	Dario Bezzina	"Eviva I-Muzika"	Dario Bezzina	96	56	152	2
14	Ylenia Caruana	"Colour Dreaming"	Ylenia Carauna	48	72	120	5
15	Raisa Piscopo	"Don't You Think It's Time"	Raisa Piscopo	32	36	68	12
16	Cristina & Ryan	"Young and Free"	Kristina Camilleri Burlo; Ryan Abela	51	24	75	11

Detailed Jury Votes
R/O	Song	Jury 1	Jury 2	Jury 3	Jury 4	Jury 5	Jury 6	Total
1	"Because We R Friends"	8	1	9	10	3	7	38
2	"Precious time"	7	2	1	2	12	3	27
3	"The Magic Window"	18	20	3	9	16	2	68
4	"Say 'No'"	4	16	7	14	6	18	65
5	"Warzone Children"	1	18	18	18	20	14	89
6	"Colours of Love"	16	9	5	6	18	6	60
7	"Power of a Song"	20	3	20	16	4	10	73
8	"Talk To Me"	5	4	11	11	11	1	43
9	"Dream"	12	14	10	12	8	16	72
10	"Come Over"	2	8	6	1	1	5	23
11	"One Way Journey"	9	7	14	8	7	12	57
12	"Shalom"	3	10	4	4	9	4	34
13	"Eviva I-Muzika"	14	12	16	20	14	20	96
14	"Colour Dreaming"	11	11	2	5	10	9	48
15	"Don't You Think It's Time"	6	5	8	3	2	8	32
16	"Young and Free"	10	6	12	7	5	11	51

== At Eurovision ==
Malta performed 2nd in the contest, following Greece and preceding the Netherlands. Malta placed 12th out of total 18 countries with 14 points.

=== Voting ===
Points awarded to Malta
Score	Country
12 points	
10 points	
8 points	
7 points	
6 points	
5 points	
4 points	Denmark; United Kingdom
3 points	Macedonia
2 points	Netherlands
1 point	Romania

Points awarded by Malta
Score	Country
12 points	Greece
10 points	United Kingdom
8 points	Cyprus
7 points	Spain
6 points	Macedonia
5 points	Denmark
4 points	Switzerland
3 points	Netherlands
2 points	Romania
1 point	France
