= Denmark in the Junior Eurovision Song Contest 2004 =

- Junior Eurovision Song Contest 2004
- Country: Denmark
- Selection process: MGP 2004
- Selection date: 25 September 2004

Competing entry
- Song: "Pigen er min"
- Artist: Cool Kids

Placement
- Final result: 5th, 116 points

Participation chronology

Denmark was represented at the Junior Eurovision Song Contest 2004, sending their second entry to the contest. The Danish entry was Cool Kids with the song "Pigen er min", which was the winner of the Danish national selection MGP 2004.

== Before Junior Eurovision ==
=== MGP 2004 ===
DR held the 4th edition of the MGP contest on 25 September 2004 to select the Danish entry to the Junior Eurovision Song Contest.

The final was held at the DR Studio 3 in Copenhagen, hosted by Christine Milton and Mads Lindemann. The winner was chosen through two rounds of televoting and SMS voting: firstly, the top 5 songs were selected from the 10 competing songs to progress to the superfinal, where the final winner was chosen through another round of televoting. The votes were distributed among a number of regions, who gave points to each song.

The winner was Cool Kids with his song "Pigen er min", receiving 58 points.

Final – 17 September 2004
Draw	Artist	Song	Result
1	Simone	"Hvorfor gik du din vej?"	Eliminated
2	Green Kidz	"På en grøn grøn sommerdag"	Eliminated
3	G=Beat	"Buster Buster"	Superfinalist
4	Frigg	"Jeg ka' li' det"	Eliminated
5	Cool Kids	"Pigen er min"	Superfinalist
6	Line Rømer	"Stop Stop"	Superfinalist
7	Amalie og Frederikke	"Tænker på et kram"	Superfinalist
8	Cozy	"Helt special"	Superfinalist
9	Nico & Julie	"Første blik"	Eliminated
10	C-Kat	"Helt Utroligt"	Eliminated

Superfinal – 17 September 2004
Draw	Artist	Song	Jutland	Funen	Zealand & Islands	Greater Copenhagen	SMS voting	Total	Place
1	G=Beat	"Buster Buster"	6	8	4	8	6	32	4
2	Cool Kids	"Pigen er min"	12	12	10	12	12	58	1
3	Line Rømer	"Stop Stop"	4	4	6	4	4	22	5
4	Amalie og Frederikke	"Tænker på et kram"	8	6	8	6	8	36	3
5	Cozy	"Helt special"	10	10	12	10	10	52	2

== At Junior Eurovision ==
Cool Kids performed 14th in the running order of the contest, held in Lillehammer, Norway, following United Kingdom and preceding Spain. At the close of the voting Denmark received 116 points, placing 5th of the 18 competing entries.

=== Voting ===
Points awarded to Denmark
Score	Country
12 points	Norway
10 points	Sweden; United Kingdom
8 points	Macedonia; Poland; Romania
7 points	Cyprus; Greece; Netherlands; Spain
6 points	Croatia
5 points	Belarus; France; Malta
4 points	Belgium; Latvia
3 points	Switzerland
2 points	
1 point	

Points awarded by Denmark
Score	Country
12 points	Spain
10 points	United Kingdom
8 points	Croatia
7 points	Norway
6 points	France
5 points	Macedonia
4 points	Malta
3 points	Sweden
2 points	Romania
1 point	Cyprus
