= RTBF Sat =

Belgian international television channel

- Country: Belgium

Ownership
- Owner: RTBF

History
- Launched: 26 November 2001
- Closed: 15 February 2010
- Former names: RTBF Satellite

Links
- Website: rtbfsat.be

RTBF Sat was a Belgian international television channel, available throughout Europe by digital satellite.

== History ==
RTBF Sat was launched by RTBF on 26 November 2001. From 26 November 2008, the channel changed satellite of transmission from Astra to Hot Bird.

On 15 February 2010, RTBF Sat closed down due to budgetary constraints. A possible RTBF Sat relaunch is mentioned in RTBF's 2013-2017 contract, which was ultimately never achieved.
