= Poland in the Junior Eurovision Song Contest 2004 =

- Junior Eurovision Song Contest 2004
- Participating broadcaster: Telewizja Polska (TVP)
- Country: Poland
- Selection process: Eurowizja dla Dzieci 2004
- Selection date: 19 September 2004

Competing entry
- Song: "Łap życie"
- Artist: KWADro
- Songwriters: Weronika Bochat; Anna Klamczynska; Kamila Piątkowska; Dominika Rydz

Placement
- Final result: 17th, 3 points

Participation chronology

Poland was represented at the Junior Eurovision Song Contest 2004 with the song "Łap życie", written Weronika Bochat, Anna Klamczynska, Kamila Piątkowska, and Dominika Rydz, and performed by KWADro. The Polish participating broadcaster, Telewizja Polska (TVP), organised the national final Eurowizja dla Dzieci 2004 to select its entry for the contest.

== Before Junior Eurovision ==
=== Eurowizja dla Dzieci 2004 ===
Telewizja Polska (TVP) opened the submission window for the national final from 29 August until 10 September 2004. On 15 September 2004, the twelve finalists of the national final were announced. Originally the results were supposed to be decided by 50% televoting and 50% professional jury, but it was later decided it would be only decided by professional jury.

The national final was recorded on 19 September 2004 at 17:00 CET in TVP Studios, but was broadcast on 26 September 2004 at 15:30 CET on TVP1. The final was hosted by Michał Juszczakiewicz and Zuzanna Madejska.

Final – 19 September 2004
R/O	Artist	Song	Songwriter(s)
1	Fart	"Śpiewaj"	K. Wroblewski; S. Tarasiuk
2	Julia Kopczyk	"Jestem jaka jestem"	J. Kopczyk
3	Patrycja Kowalska	"Wyobraźnia"	P. Kowalska
4	Graffiti	"Dogonić marzenia"	K. Młynek; L. Klonowska
5	Agata Stodolna	"To samo"	A. Stodolna
6	Adrianna Wenclewska	"Chcę pamiętać"	A. Wenclewska
7	Paweł Pietrzyk	"Rockendrolowe sny"	P. Pietrzyk
8	Monika Bękelarska	"Mur"	M. Bękelarska
9	Dominika Guzek and Kasper Zborowski-Weychman	"Czary"	Kasper Zborowski-Weychman
10	Agata Korwin	"Swoje zdanie"	A. Korwin
11	KWADro	"Łap życie"	A. Klamczyńska; D. Rydz; K. Piątkowska; W. Bochat
12	Natalia Goerne	"Mam marzenia do spełnienia"	N. Goerne

== At Junior Eurovision ==
At the running order draw, Poland were drawn to perform eighth on 20 November 2004, following Macedonia and preceding Cyprus.

=== Voting ===
Points awarded to Poland
Score	Country
12 points	
10 points	
8 points	
7 points	
6 points	
5 points	
4 points	
3 points	
2 points	France
1 point	Belarus

Points awarded by Poland
Score	Country
12 points	Spain
10 points	United Kingdom
8 points	Denmark
7 points	Croatia
6 points	Romania
5 points	Macedonia
4 points	France
3 points	Belarus
2 points	Belgium
1 point	Latvia
