= Croatia in the Junior Eurovision Song Contest 2004 =

- Junior Eurovision Song Contest 2004
- Participating broadcaster: Hrvatska radiotelevizija (HRT)
- Country: Croatia
- Selection process: 2. Izbor za Dječju Pjesmu Eurovizije 2004
- Selection date: 25 September 2004

Competing entry
- Song: "Hej mali"
- Artist: Nika Turković
- Songwriters: Nika Turković

Placement
- Final result: 3rd, 126 points

Participation chronology

Croatia was represented at the Junior Eurovision Song Contest 2004 with the song "Hej mali", written and performed by Nika Turković. The Croatian participating broadcaster, Hrvatska radiotelevizija (HRT), organised an national final to select its entry for the contest.

== Before Junior Eurovision ==
=== 2. Izbor za Dječju Pjesmu Eurovizije 2004 ===
2. Izbor za Dječju Pjesmu Eurovizije 2004 was the second edition of the national selection organised by Hrvatska radiotelevizija (HRT) to select its entry for the Junior Eurovision Song Contest 2004.

==== Competing entries ====
Artists and composers were able to submit their entries to the broadcaster. 100 entries were received by the broadcaster during the submission period. An expert committee consisting of Sandra Bagarić, Josip Cvitanović, Rajko Dujmić, Mladen Kušec, Marin Margitić and Maja Vučić selected twelve entries and two reserve entries for the competition from the received submissions. The entries and reserve entries were revealed on 23 May 2004.

==== Final ====
The final took place on 25 September 2004 in Zagreb. All the songs were accompanied by a symphony orchestra, and the winner was determined by a public televote. Only the top four places were announced. Dino Jelusić opened the show with "Ti si moja prva ljubav" and the interval act was a dance act by Colonia.

Final – 25 September 2004
| R/O | Artist | Song | Songwriter(s) | Conductor | Place |
|---|---|---|---|---|---|
| 1 | Petra Škofić | "Potres" | Petra Škofić | Josip Cvitanović | —N/a |
| 2 | Anita Novak | "Moja utjeha" | Anita Novak | Luka Vukšić | —N/a |
| 3 | Mia Kordić | "Mogu" | Nika Turković | Luka Vukšić | 4 |
| 4 | Kristijan Stepanić | "Da li još" | Kristijan Stepanić | Josip Cvitanović | —N/a |
| 5 | Lana Ivanković | "Svakom tko zna" | Lana Ivanković | Josip Cvitanović | —N/a |
| 6 | Nela Buj | "Suze malene" | Nela Buj | Luka Vukšić | —N/a |
| 7 | Tea Zec | "Don't Worry" | Tea Zec | Josip Cvitanović | —N/a |
| 8 | Iva Valentić | "Hajde upali mrak" | Iva Valentić | Luka Vukšić | 3 |
| 9 | Kristina Jarić and Niko Miljanić | "Djeca svijeta" | Kristina Jarić | Luka Vukšić | —N/a |
| 10 | Sedmo Nebo | "Odlazim" | Jakov Milanković; Ana Guberina | Josip Cvitanović | —N/a |
| 11 | Nika Turković | "Hej mali" | Nika Turković | Luka Vukšić | 1 |
| 12 | Party Kiss and Double F. | "Nije ok" | Hana Blažević | Josip Cvitanović | 2 |

Reserve entries
| Artist | Song |
|---|---|
| Igor Opočak and Tea Gjini | "Hi, hi baby!" |
| Lucija Lučić | "Zbogom oružje" |

== At Junior Eurovision ==
=== Voting ===
Points awarded to Croatia
| Score | Country |
|---|---|
| 12 points | Macedonia; United Kingdom |
| 10 points | Norway |
| 8 points | Belarus; Denmark; France; Latvia; Netherlands; Sweden; Switzerland |
| 7 points | Poland; Romania |
| 6 points | Belgium; Cyprus; Spain |
| 5 points | |
| 4 points | Greece |
| 3 points | |
| 2 points | |
| 1 point | |

Points awarded by Croatia
| Score | Country |
|---|---|
| 12 points | Spain |
| 10 points | Romania |
| 8 points | Macedonia |
| 7 points | United Kingdom |
| 6 points | Denmark |
| 5 points | Cyprus |
| 4 points | France |
| 3 points | Greece |
| 2 points | Belgium |
| 1 point | Netherlands |
