= Sweden in the Junior Eurovision Song Contest 2004 =

- Junior Eurovision Song Contest 2004
- Country: Sweden
- Selection process: Lilla Melodifestivalen 2004
- Selection date: 9 October 2004

Competing entry
- Song: "Varför jag?"
- Artist: Limelights

Placement
- Final result: 15th, 8 points

Participation chronology

Sweden was represented at the Junior Eurovision Song Contest 2004 by the Limelights and the song "Varför jag?". the duo of Anna Jalkéus and Liselotte Östblom were the winners of the Lilla Melodifestivalen contest in 2004.

== Before Junior Eurovision ==
=== Lilla Melodifestivalen 2004 ===
Lilla Melodifestivalen 2004 was used to select the artist to represent Sweden at the Junior Eurovision Song Contest 2004, organised by Swedish broadcaster Sveriges Television (SVT). More than 1400 entries were submitted to SVT to compete in the contest, with only 10 being selected to compete in the televised contest on 9 October 2004.

The contest was hosted by children's TV presenter Mela Tesfazion and singer of Barbados and Alcazar Magnus Carlsson. The winner was decided by a jury and public televoting.

During the interval act, Lena Philipsson performed her new single "Lena Anthem".

Draw	Artist	Song	Jury	Televote	Total	Place
1	Yazmina Simic	"Jag vill veta nu"	34	0	34	6
2	Erik Nielsen	"Oh La La"	22	50	72	2
3	JaP	"Min vän"	10	0	10	10
4	Jessica and Karin	"Att ha en vän"	16	0	16	9
5	ReLi	"När jag åker moped"	40	20	60	5
6	Sisters	"Sjörövarvisa"	32	0	32	7
7	Girlzz	"Förstå"	18	0	18	8
8	Ville Blomgren	"Min gröna ö"	34	30	64	3
9	Limelights	"Varför jag?"	22	60	82	1
10	Reggae Boyz	"Shabalabala polarn"	22	40	62	4

== At Junior Eurovision ==
On the night of the contest, held in Lillehammer in Norway, the Limelights performed 16th in the running order of the contest, following Spain and preceding Belgium. At the close of the voting "Varför jag" received 8 points, placing 15th of the 18 competing entries.

=== Voting ===
Points awarded to Sweden
Score	Country
12 points	
10 points	
8 points	
7 points	
6 points	
5 points	
4 points	Norway
3 points	Denmark
2 points	
1 point	Cyprus

Points awarded by Sweden
Score	Country
12 points	Spain
10 points	Denmark
8 points	Croatia
7 points	United Kingdom
6 points	Romania
5 points	Norway
4 points	France
3 points	Macedonia
2 points	Belgium
1 point	Netherlands
