= Junior Eurovision Song Contest 2004 =

International song competition for youth

Date and venue
- Final: 20 November 2004
- Venue: Håkons Hall; Lillehammer, Norway

Organisation
- Organiser: European Broadcasting Union (EBU)
- Executive supervisor: Svante Stockselius

Production
- Host broadcaster: Norwegian Broadcasting Corporation (NRK)
- Director: Gitte Calmeyer
- Executive producer: Ivar Ragne Jensen
- Presenters: Stian Barsnes Simonsen; Nadia Hasnaoui

Participants
- Number of entries: 18
- Debuting countries: France; Switzerland
- Participation map: Participating countries

Vote
- Voting system: Each country awards 1–8, 10, and 12 points to their 10 favourite songs
- Winning song: Spain "Antes muerta que sencilla"

The Junior Eurovision Song Contest 2004 was the second edition of the Junior Eurovision Song Contest, held on 20 November 2004 at Håkons Hall in Lillehammer, Norway, and presented by Stian Barsnes Simonsen and Nadia Hasnaoui. It was organised by the European Broadcasting Union (EBU) and host broadcaster the Norwegian Broadcasting Corporation (NRK). It was broadcast in twenty countries and viewed by 100 million people. Broadcasters from eighteen countries participated, with France and Switzerland participating for the first time.

The winner was Spain with the song "Antes muerta que sencilla" by 9-year-old María Isabel from her debut album ¡No me toques las palmas que me conozco! which was released before the contest. Dino Jelusić, who won the 2003 contest for Croatia, presented the award to María Isabel. Since then, she has entered the charts in not only Spain but also France, Italy, Scandinavia, Latin America and has gone on to release further albums in her home country.

Greece, who came ninth, received more sets of twelve points than the United Kingdom, who came second. France, who came sixth, were voted by all the other countries that took part, which is more than the number of countries that voted for Romania, who came fourth and Croatia, who came third. Incidentally, the same three countries occupied the top three places as last year, just in a different order. These three countries were Spain, the United Kingdom, and Croatia.

== Origins and history ==
The origins of the contest date back to 2000 when Danmarks Radio held a song contest for Danish children that year and the following year. The idea was extended to a Scandinavian song competition in 2002, known as MGP Nordic, with Denmark, Norway and Sweden as participants. In November 2002, the EBU picked up the idea for a song contest featuring children and opened the competition to all EBU member broadcasters making it a pan-European event. The working title of the programme was "Eurovision Song Contest for Children", branded with the name of the EBU's already long-running and popular song competition, the Eurovision Song Contest. Denmark was asked to host the first programme that took place the following year after their experience with their own contests and the MGP Nordic.

== Location ==
Locations of the bidding countries. Countries which withdrew from hosting are marked in red. The chosen host country is marked in blue.

=== Host city selection ===
Norway was the third country of choice for this contest as the European Broadcasting Union (EBU) had, in May 2003, originally chosen broadcaster ITV of the United Kingdom to host the event. Shortly after the first contest in Copenhagen, it was confirmed that the next edition would be held in Manchester on 20 November 2004. However, ITV pulled out in May 2004 due to finance and scheduling problems. In August 2004, it was revealed that Granada Television, who would have co-produced the show with Carlton Television, had decided to pull out of the deal claiming the allocated budget of €1,500,000 was too small. The EBU offered funding of €900,000 to produce the event, but the ITV company said it would have cost almost €2,500,000 so asked them to find a new host broadcaster. It is also thought that another factor to their decision was the previous years' audience ratings for ITV which were below the expected amount.

The venue was therefore moved to Croatia, the winning country of 2003, but the Croatian broadcaster HRT reportedly forgot that the prospective venue for the event was already booked for the period the Junior Eurovision Song Contest was to take place. It was at this point that in June 2004, with five months remaining until the event would be held, that Norwegian broadcaster NRK offered to organise the next contest. Hosting duties were confirmed by the broadcaster itself a few days later, adding that the competition would take place at Håkons Hall in Lillehammer on the same date as originally planned.

=== Venue ===
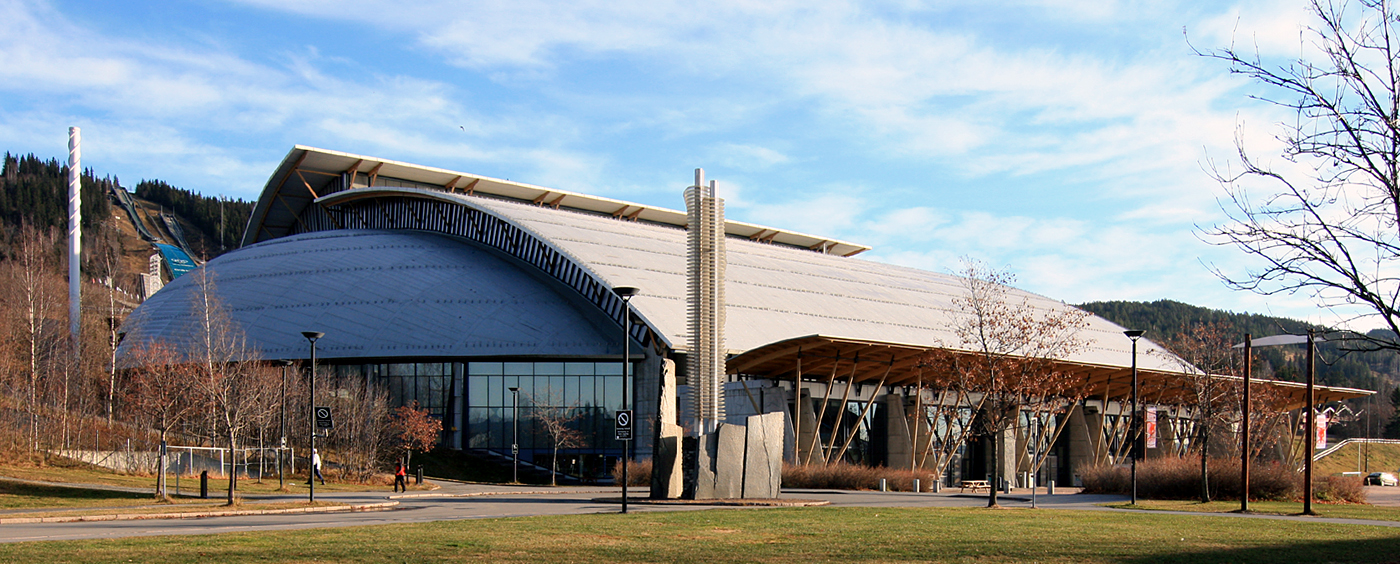
Håkons Hall in Lillehammer was the eventual venue for the contest.

Håkons Hall, sometimes anglicized as Håkon Hall and Haakons Hall, is an arena located at Stampesletta in Lillehammer, Norway, built for the 1994 Winter Olympics. With a spectator capacity of 11,500 people, it is the largest handball and ice hockey venue in the country.

Håkons Hall is regularly used for handball and ice hockey tournaments, concerts, exhibitions, conferences and banquets. The venue is owned by Lillehammer Municipality via the subsidiary Lillehammer Olympiapark, which owns all the Olympic venues in Lillehammer. The Norwegian Olympic Museum is located in the arena, which is located next to the smaller Kristins Hall. The hall was opened on 1 February 1993 having cost 238 million Norwegian krone (NOK).

== Participants ==
Cover art of the official album

The EBU released the initial list of participants with 20 competing countries. France and Switzerland made their debut in the contest. Although initially confirmed as a participating countries, both Germany and Israel ended up pulling out before the contest. There were also early reports that Ireland had planned to enter in the contest, but did not appear on the final list of participants.

Prior to the event, a compilation album featuring all the songs from the 2004 contest, along with karaoke versions, was put together by the European Broadcasting Union and released by Universal Music Group in November 2004.

Participants of the Junior Eurovision Song Contest 2004
Country	Broadcaster	Artist	Song	Language	Songwriter(s)
Belarus	BTRC	Egor Volchek	"Spiavajcie sa mnoju" (Спявайце са мною)	Belarusian	Ulada Suslenka; Egor Volchek
Belgium	RTBF	Free Spirits	"Accroche-toi"	French	Free Spirits
Croatia	HRT	Nika Turković	"Hej mali"	Croatian	Nika Turković
Cyprus	CyBC	Marios Tofi	"Onira" (Όνειρα)	Greek	Marios Tofi
Denmark	DR	Cool Kids	"Pigen er min"	Danish	Ibrahim "Ibo" Chouqeir; Caroline Forsberg Thybo; Niki "Nack" Popovic
France	France Télévisions	Thomas Pontier	"Si on voulait bien"	French	Thomas Pontier
Greece	ERT	Secret Band	"O palios mou eaftos" (Ο παλιός μου εαυτός)	Greek	Andreas Kefalas
Latvia	LTV	Mārtiņš Tālbergs and C-Stones Juniors	"Balts vai melns"	Latvian	Mārtiņš Tālbergs
Macedonia	MRT	Martina Siljanovska	"Zabava" (Забава)	Macedonian	Martina Siljanovska
Malta	PBS	Young Talent Team	"Power of a Song"	English	Charlotte Debattista; Marilena Gauci
Netherlands	AVRO	Klaartje and Nicky	"Hij is een kei"	Dutch	Nicky Bruin; Klaartje Meulemeester
Norway	NRK	@lek	"En stjerne skal jeg bli"	Norwegian	Aleksander Moberg
Poland	TVP	KWADro	"Łap życie"	Polish	Weronika Bochat; Anna Klamczynska; Kamila Piątkowska; Dominika Rydz
Romania	TVR	Noni Răzvan Ene	"Îți mulțumesc"	Romanian	Noni Răzvan Ene
Spain	TVE	María Isabel	"Antes muerta que sencilla"	Spanish	María Isabel López Rodríguez; José Muñiz
Sweden	SVT	Limelights	"Varför jag?"	Swedish	Anna Jalkéus; Liselotte Östblom
Switzerland	RTSI	Demis Mirarchi	"Birichino"	Italian	Alessandro Maraniello
United Kingdom	ITV	Cory Spedding	"The Best Is Yet to Come"	English	Cory Spedding

=== Returning artists ===
Even though the rules of Junior Eurovision at the time did not allow participation of returning artists, Latvia's Mārtiņš Tālbergs was a backing vocalist and dancer for Dzintars Čīča the previous year.

== Format ==
=== Visual design ===
On 2 September 2004, host broadcaster NRK presented the official logo of the contest. The theme of the show was later confirmed as bright Nordic winter nights, sparkling stars and snow crystals, set in a hip-hop atmosphere.

=== Presenters ===
On 23 September 2004, it was announced that Nadia Hasnaoui and Stian Barsnes Simonsen would host the contest. The hosting couple also led the final of national qualifying rounds to the competition, Melodi Grand Prix Junior 2004 on 12 June.

=== Voting ===
All countries used televoting to decide on their top ten. In normal Eurovision fashion, each country's favourite song was given 12 points, their second favourite 10, and their third to tenth favourites were given 8–1 points.

== Contest overview ==
The event took place on 20 November 2004 at 20:15 CET. Eighteen countries participated, with the running order published on 14 October 2004. All the countries competing were eligible to vote by televote. Spain won with 171 points, with the United Kingdom, Croatia, Romania, Denmark, completing the top five. Belarus, Sweden, Switzerland, Latvia, and Poland, both of whom came last, occupied the bottom five positions.

The show was opened by the flag parade showing all participating countries. The interval act included Irish boy band Westlife performed "Ain't That a Kick in the Head?" live on stage.

R/O	Country	Artist	Song	Points	Place
1	Greece	Secret Band	"O palios mou eaftos"	48	9
2	Malta	Young Talent Team	"Power of a Song"	14	12
3	Netherlands	Klaartje and Nicky	"Hij is een kei"	27	11
4	Switzerland	Demis Mirarchi	"Birichino"	4	16
5	Norway	@lek	"En stjerne skal jeg bli"	12	13
6	France	Thomas Pontier	"Si on voulait bien"	78	6
7	Macedonia	Martina Siljanovska	"Zabava"	64	7
8	Poland	KWADro	"Łap życie"	3	17
9	Cyprus	Marios Tofi	"Onira"	61	8
10	Belarus	Egor Volchek	"Spiavajcie sa mnoju"	9	14
11	Croatia	Nika Turković	"Hej mali"	126	3
12	Latvia	Mārtiņš Tālbergs and C-Stones Juniors	"Balts vai melns"	3	17
13	United Kingdom	Cory Spedding	"The Best Is Yet to Come"	140	2
14	Denmark	Cool Kids	"Pigen er min"	116	5
15	Spain	María Isabel	"Antes muerta que sencilla"	171	1
16	Sweden	Limelights	"Varför jag?"	8	15
17	Belgium	Free Spirits	"Accroche-toi"	37	10
18	Romania	Noni Răzvan Ene	"Îți mulțumesc"	123	4

=== Spokespersons ===
1. Greece – Kalli Georgelli
2. Malta – Thea Saliba
3. Netherlands – Danny Hoekstra
4. Switzerland – Alessia Milani
5. Norway – Ida Ursin-Holm
6. France – Gabrielle
7. Macedonia – Filip
8. Poland – Jadwiga Jaskulski
9. Cyprus – Stella María Koukkidi
10. Belarus – Darya
11. Croatia – Buga
12. Latvia – Sabīne Berezina
13. United Kingdom – Charlie Allan
14. Denmark – Anne Gadegaard
15. Spain – Lucho
16. Sweden – Queenie Marksdotter
17. Belgium – Alexander Schönfelder
18. Romania – Emy

== Detailed voting results ==
Detailed voting results
		Total score	Greece	Malta	Netherlands	Switzerland	Norway	France	Macedonia	Poland	Cyprus	Belarus	Croatia	Latvia	United Kingdom	Denmark	Spain	Sweden	Belgium	Romania
Contestants	Greece	48		12	1	2	1	3			12		3		5		1		2	6
Contestants	Malta	14			2				3						4	4				1
Contestants	Netherlands	27		3			3	1	1			3	1	5			2	1	7	
Contestants	Switzerland	4		4																
Contestants	Norway	12														7		5		
Contestants	France	78	6	1	5	6	2		2	4	4	6	4	7	2	6	8	4	8	3
Contestants	Macedonia	64		6	6	5	5	4		5	3		8	3	3	5	3	3	3	2
Contestants	Poland	3						2				1								
Contestants	Cyprus	61	12	8	3	1			6			4	5	2	8	1	5		1	5
Contestants	Belarus	9	1							3				1						4
Contestants	Croatia	126	4		8	8	10	8	12	7	6	8		8	12	8	6	8	6	7
Contestants	Latvia	3	2							1										
Contestants	United Kingdom	140	5	10	12	7	6	6	5	10	5	10	7	10		10	10	7	10	10
Contestants	Denmark	116	7	5	7	3	12	5	8	8	7	5	6	4	10		7	10	4	8
Contestants	Spain	171	10	7	10	12	8	12	10	12	10	7	12	6	7	12		12	12	12
Contestants	Sweden	8					4				1					3				
Contestants	Belgium	37	3		4	4		7	4	2	2	2	2		1		4	2		
Contestants	Romania	123	8	2		10	7	10	7	6	8	12	10	12	6	2	12	6	5	

=== 12 points ===
Below is a summary of the maximum 12 points each country awarded to another:

N.	Contestant	Nation(s) giving 12 points
8	Spain	Belgium, Croatia, Denmark, France, Poland, Romania, Sweden, Switzerland
3	Romania	Belarus, Latvia, Spain
2	Croatia	Macedonia, United Kingdom
2	Greece	Cyprus, Malta
1	Cyprus	Greece
1	Denmark	Norway
1	United Kingdom	Netherlands

== Other countries ==
For a country to be eligible for potential participation in the Junior Eurovision Song Contest, it needs to be an active member of the EBU. It is currently unknown whether the EBU issue invitations of participation to all 56 active members like they do for the Eurovision Song Contest.

- Germany – After failing to participate in the previous year, German broadcaster Norddeutscher Rundfunk (NDR) was announced as a debutant at the 2004 contest. However, the country later ended up pulling out before the contest. No reason for the withdrawal was given. Germany would only debut sixteen years later at the Junior Eurovision Song Contest 2020.
- Ireland – Irish television was reported to have received an invitation to participate in the 2004 contest and were among the 20 countries expected to take part in Lillehammer. However, in the end Ireland did not debut and would stay out of the competition until 2015.
- Israel – The Israeli Broadcasting Authority (IBA) initially planned to debut at this year's contest but the debut never happened. Israel and the IBA would not debut until 2012.

== Broadcasts ==
Known details on the broadcasts in each country, including the specific broadcasting stations and commentators are shown in the tables below.

Broadcasters and commentators in participating countries
Country	Broadcaster	Channel(s)	Commentator(s)	Ref(s)
Belarus	BTRC	Belarus 1		
Belgium	VRT	TV1	Ilse Van Hoecke and Marcel Vanthilt	
Belgium	RTBF	La Une		
Croatia	HRT	HRT 1		
Cyprus	CyBC	RIK 1		
Denmark	DR	DR1		
France	France Télévisions	France 3	Elsa Fayer and Bruno Berberes	
Greece	ERT	ET1	Giorgos Frantzeskakis	
Latvia	LTV	LTV1	Kārlis Streips	
Malta	PBS	TVM	Valerie Vella	
Netherlands	NPO	Nederland 2		
Norway	NRK	NRK1 (Note: Deferred repeat broadcast on NRK2 the following day at 15:10 (CEST))	Marianne Furevold and Jonna Støme	
Poland	TVP	TVP1	Artur Orzech	
Romania	TVR	TVR 1		
Spain	TVE	La Primera	Fernando Argenta	
Sweden	SVT	SVT1	Pekka Heino	
Switzerland	SRG SSR	TSR 2	Philippe Robin	
Switzerland	SRG SSR	TSI 2		
United Kingdom	ITV	ITV2, ITV1 (Note: Delayed broadcast in a shortened format on 21 November at 14:15 UTC)	Matt Brown	

Broadcasters and commentators in non-participating countries
Country	Broadcaster	Channel	Commentator(s)	Ref.
Australia	SBS	SBS TV (delayed)	No commentary	
Bosnia and Herzegovina	BHRT	BHT1 (Note: Delayed broadcast on 3 January 2005 at 09:25 (CET))	Unknown	
Estonia	ETV (Note: Delayed broadcast on 28 May 2005 at 19:00 (EET))		Unknown	

== Official album ==
Junior Eurovision Song Contest Lillehammer '04, is a compilation album put together by the European Broadcasting Union, and was released by Universal Music Group in November 2004. The album features all the songs from the 2004 contest.

== See also ==
- Eurovision Song Contest 2004
- Eurovision Young Musicians 2004
