= Spain in the Junior Eurovision Song Contest 2004 =

- Junior Eurovision Song Contest 2004
- Participating broadcaster: Televisión Española (TVE)
- Country: Spain
- Selection process: Eurojunior 2004
- Selection date: 21 September 2004

Competing entry
- Song: "Antes muerta que sencilla"
- Artist: María Isabel
- Songwriters: María Isabel

Placement
- Final result: 1st, 171 points

Participation chronology

Spain was represented at the Junior Eurovision Song Contest 2004 with the song "Antes muerta que sencilla", written and performed by María Isabel. The Spanish participating broadcaster, Televisión Española (TVE), organised the national final Eurojunior 2004 in order to select its entry for the contest. The song won the contest after winning the national final.

== Before Junior Eurovision ==
=== Eurojunior 2004 ===
Eurojunior 2004 was the second edition of Eurojunior, the Spanish national final organised by Televisión Española (TVE) to select its entry for the Junior Eurovision Song Contest 2004. The competition had two phases: the first phase had a talent show format, and consisted of five shows; the second phase consisted of three live shows.

3,000 artists have been presented to the casting, which was held across twelve Spanish cities (Barcelona, San Sebastian, Madrid, Seville, Granada, Palma de Mallorca, Santiago de Compostela, Zaragoza, Alicante, Valencia, Oviedo, and Las Palmas de Gran Canaria) during March and April 2004. 150 artists entered the second round of the casting which took place between late April and early May 2004, of which only 80 were selected. The 80 selected artists entered the Academy on 19 June 2004, of which 40 finalists were ultimately chosen.

==== First phase ====
The first phase consisted of five shows, aired in July 2004, which showed a summary of the contestants workdays at the Academy. In this phase, the 40 contestants were shortlisted to eleven for the second phase.

==== Second phase ====
===== Show 1 =====
In the first live show, aired on 7 September 2004, each contestant (solo or duo) performed two original songs, and the televote was opened at the end of the show to select the preferred song from each act.

Show 1 – 7 September 2004
Artist	Song	Televote	Result
Blas	"Cantaré"	32%	—N/a
Blas	"Sentir"	68%	Finalist
Carolina & Alba	"Loca, loca"	41%	—N/a
Carolina & Alba	"Qué calor"	59%	Finalist
Mirela	"Sí o no"	47%	—N/a
Mirela	"Conocí el amor"	53%	Finalist
Sara, Anabel & Rocío	"Eres un bombón"	71%	Finalist
Sara, Anabel & Rocío	"Ponte las pilas"	29%	—N/a
Lydia & Lucía	"Un poco tú y un poco yo"	40%	—N/a
Lydia & Lucía	"Música en el corazón"	60%	Finalist
María Isabel	"Antes muerta que sencilla"	61%	Finalist
María Isabel	"Mira niño"	39%	—N/a
Nico	"Yo soy un bambino"	66%	Finalist
Nico	"Te propongo"	34%	—N/a

===== Show 2 =====
The second live show was aired on 14 September 2004. Each act performed one song, and the televote was opened at the end of the show to select the winner.

Show 2 – 14 September 2004
R/O	Artist	Song
1	Carolina & Alba	"Loca, loca"
2	María Isabel	"Antes muerta que sencilla"
3	Sara, Anabel & Rocío	"Eres un bombón"
4	Blas	"Sentir"
5	Mirela	"Conocí el amor"
6	Nico	"Yo soy un bambino"
7	Lydia & Lucía	"Música en el corazón"

===== Show 3 =====
During the third show aired on 21 September 2004, "Antes muerta que sencilla" performed by María Isabel was announced as the winner of Eurojunior 2004; with "Sentir" by Blas Cantó placing second.

== At Junior Eurovision ==
On 20 November 2004, the Junior Eurovision Song Contest was held at the Håkons Hall in Lillehammer hosted by the Norwegian Broadcasting Corporation (NRK), and broadcast live throughout the continent. María Isabel performed "Antes muerta que sencilla" fifteenth on the evening. At the close of voting, the song had received 171 points, winning the competition.

=== Voting ===
Points awarded to Spain
Score	Country
12 points	Belgium; Croatia; Denmark; France; Poland; Romania; Sweden; Switzerland
10 points	Cyprus; Greece; Macedonia; Netherlands
8 points	Norway
7 points	Belarus; Malta; United Kingdom
6 points	Latvia
5 points	
4 points	
3 points	
2 points	
1 point	

Points awarded by Spain
Score	Country
12 points	Romania
10 points	United Kingdom
8 points	France
7 points	Denmark
6 points	Croatia
5 points	Cyprus
4 points	Belgium
3 points	Macedonia
2 points	Netherlands
1 point	Greece
