= Noni Răzvan Ene =

- Born: Noni Răzvan Ene; 17 April 1992 (age 33); Bucharest, Romania
- Genres: Pop music, commercials, popcorn
- Occupations: Singer, dancer, star, former television presenter
- Instruments: Vocals, piano, drums
- Years active: 1997–present
- Labels: Walt Disney; Summit Records
- Website: noniene.com

Noni Răzvan Ene (Romanian pronunciation: [ˈnoni rəzˈvan ˈene]; born 17 April 1992), professionally known by his stage name Noni, is a Romanian singer, songwriter, music producer, TV personality and dancer. Noni is best known worldwide for representing Romania in Junior Eurovision Song Contest 2004 with the song Îţi mulţumesc, finished fourth place with 123 points. It's the best result Romania ever gained.

Born and raised in Bucharest, Romania by a family of musicians, Noni began making music at a young age and performed in various musical venues throughout his childhood. He graduated from High of School of Arts Dinu Lipatti and from this moment begin a career in television with his debut in 1997 at Abracadabra show broadcast on ProTV channel. Noni had a successful career in his childhood, in 1997 he win the contest Tip Top -Mini Top at TVR1. Noni produced songs for other artists, co-founding the production team Sindrum Media.

Noni had a successful stint with Cat Music, mostly with the song Give me the sunlight produced by Sunrise Inc but then signed with Walt Disney Records in 2010 by releasing the Romanian version for "Wouldn't Change a Thing" and Sindrum Media in 2012. He became recognized as a solo artist after lending his vocals to the songs "Unbreakable" by Astra Electronics sing by Noni in premiere at Antena 1 during the show "Neatza with Răzvan and Dani", and "No te puedo olvidar", which was a European success, in countries such as Romania, Spain, and Azerbaijan. His debut studio album, Îţi mulţumesc (2010) released by OVO Music influence Rachel Talalay who invite Noni to appear in the movie The Wind in the Willows, which starring Matt Lucas (Mr. Toad), Bob Hoskins (Badger), Mark Gatiss (Ratty), and Lee Ingleby (Mole).

Noni Ene is known for his stage performances, his soul and popcorn style and by his singing in falsetto. On stage, Noni is able to sing, dance and play a wild range of musical styles, including soul and pop music. In 2014 for being popular in his country, he received an offer from Walt Disney Pictures and provides the Romanian voice of Tadashi in Big Hero 6.

Awards and achievements
Preceded by Bubu	Romania in the Junior Eurovision Song Contest; 2004	Succeeded by Alina Eremia
