= Marios Tofi =

Greek Cypriot singer and songwriter (born 1990)

Marios Tofi Μάριος Τοφή
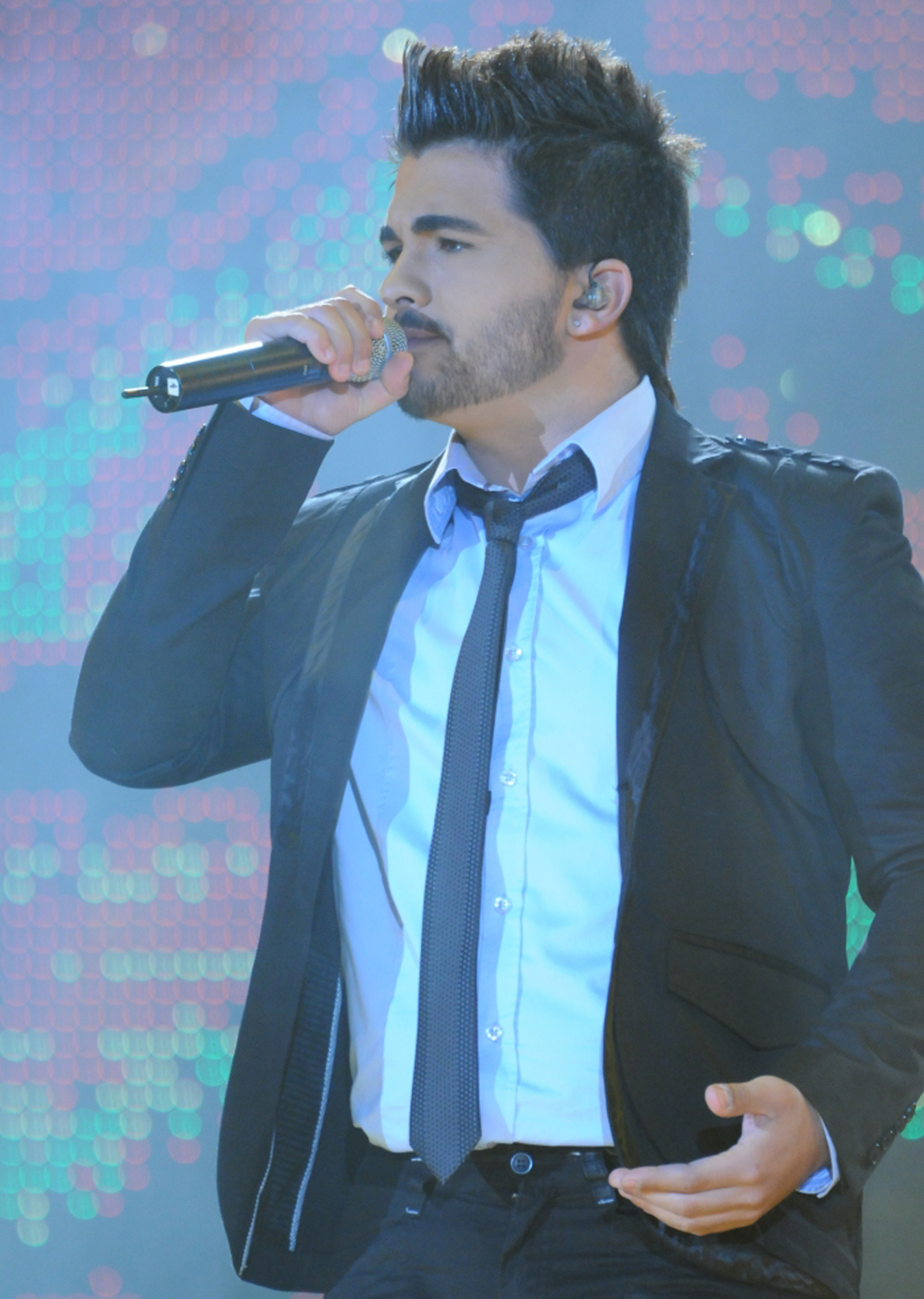
- Marios Tofi during his performance at Golden Stag in Brasov, Romania (2009).
- Born: Marios Tofi; 24 February 1990 (age 36); Athens, Greece
- Occupations: Singer, songwriter, dancer
- Years active: 1999–present
- Musical career
- Genres: Pop, Europop, dance-pop, soft rock
- Instruments: Vocals, piano, guitar, tenor saxophone, drums, percussion
- Website: www.mariostofi.com

Marios Tofi (Greek: Μάριος Τοφή, pronounced [ˈmários ˈtofí]; born 24 February 1990 in Athens, Greece) is a Greek Cypriot singer and songwriter. He is best known for representing Cyprus at the Junior Eurovision Song Contest 2004 with the song "Onira".

== Biography ==
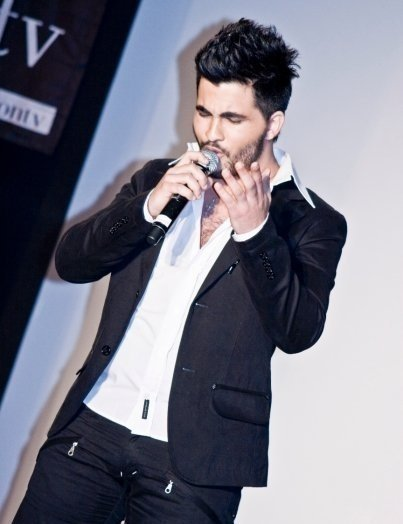
Marios Tofi during his performance at Sunrise in Baku Fashion Project in London, UK (2009).

Marios Tofi was born on 24 February 1990 in Athens, Greece to Cypriot parents. Marios Tofi has been living in Famagusta, Cyprus since five years old. From the age of eight, Marios has demonstrated an interest and passion for music, singing and dance. He got proper musical education from the beginning. He studied piano, guitar, tenor saxophone, theory of music and taking vocal courses. He also studied Classical Ballet, Latin and Flamenco for seven years. He speaks Greek, English and now is studying Spanish and French lessons. He sings in Greek, English, Spanish, Italian, French and other languages. Marios, loves performing live in big music events and festivals, he likes close contact with the audience when performing and his performances are always dynamic, full of energy and passion. He performed in several concerts and festivals in United Kingdom, Latvia, Lithuania, Bulgaria, Poland, Spain, Italy, Malta, Norway, Estonia, Macedonia, Czech Republic, Belarus, Germany, Romania, Greece, Cyprus, and much more. Marios also collaborated with Greek, Cypriot and European famous artists in live concerts and live TV shows in several countries.

=== 1999 – The Beginning ===
In April 1999, Marios participated in the 1st Pancyprian Performing Contest where he placed 1st. The contest was organized by the Cypriot broadcaster CyBC.

In June 1999, he participated in the local contest of "Kataklysmos" Festival in Larnaca, Cyprus where he placed 1st. In September 2003, the company "Chris Cash & Carry" and Marios collaborated for a school advertisement. It was a very successful advertisement and as a result the sales of the supermarket doubled. After this success, in December 2003 he accepted a second proposal from the supermarket "Chris Cash & Carry" for their Christmas advertisement, again with a successful outcome.

=== 2004 – Junior Eurovision Song Contest ===
On 7 September 2004, Marios was selected from 54 entries to represent Cyprus at the 2nd Junior Eurovision Song Contest on 20 November 2004 in Norway by televoting and by jury. After that, he has had a tour to present his very successful song "Onira" (Music/Lyrics: Marios Tofi). Also he had many appearances in Malta, United Kingdom, Latvia, Greece and other countries.

On 20 November 2004, in Lillehammer, Norway he took the very well 8th place from eighteen countries. After Junior Eurovision Song Contest he accepted many invitations from several countries to participate in their festivals.

On 27 November 2004, in Barcelona, Spain he invited to present his song on their victory celebration in Junior Eurovision Song Contest 2004. It was a special invitation to perform among famous Spanish artists and having in mind that he was the only guest star from the Junior Eurovision Song Contest.

=== 2005 – Tours / Festivals / Awards / Collaboration with Chiara ===
In June 2005, Marios participated in the International Song Festival "Song – Magic" in Varna, Bulgaria and won the "Special Award by the Jury" as the best of all among 15 countries and more than 100 songs with the songs "Xehnas" ("You forget") (Music/Lyrics: Andreas Gerolemou) and "Unbreakable" (Music: Michael Roussos, Lyrics: John Vickers). This Festival takes place every year and this is the first time after 15 years that they awarded Marios with this prize.

In August 2005, Marios participated in the International Song Festival "Palangos Gaida – 2005" in Palanga, Lithuania and won the "Audience Award" with the song "M' ena fili" ("With a kiss") (Music: Andrius Kulikausko, Lyrics: Andreas Gerlemou).

In August 2005, Marios also performed as a guest in the Festival "Heart of Gold" in Marsaskala, Malta. This is one of the biggest festivals in Malta and was for charities purposes. Dancers from the No.1 Dancing School in Malta, "YADA", danced behind Marios and both they impressed the audience.

In November 2005, Marios participated in the 7th International Song Contest "Universetalent" in Prague, Czech Republic. He was one of the 12 finalists who pre-selected among 100 entries. He won the "Journalist Jury Award" and the 3rd Prize, "Best Singer" with the song "Agapi Magiki" ("Magic Love") (Music: Michael Roussos, Lyrics: George Ioannou).

In December 2005, Marios collaborated with Chiara from Malta (2nd place – Eurovision Song Contest 2005) and made a duet with title "Once upon a dream" (Music: Michael Roussos, Greek lyrics: George Ioannou, English lyrics: John Vickers).

=== 2006 – Tours / Festivals / Awards / Eurovision Song Contest (Cyprus Final) ===
In February 2006, Marios was one of the 10 finalists who pre-selected among 114 participations in order to select the one who will represent Cyprus in Eurovision Song Contest 2006. After a hard competition he took the 2nd place by televoting with the song "Congratulations" (Music: Christodoulos Siganos, Lyrics: Christodoulos Siganos & Valentino).

In May 2006, he participated in the International Pop Song Festival "Discovery 2006" in Bulgaria and he won the "Special Award by The Jury" with the song "Xehnas" ("You forget") (Music/Lyrics: Andreas Gerolemou) and the 2nd prize as "Best Singer" with the song "Congratulations" (Music: Christodoulos Siganos, Lyrics: Christodoulos Siganos & Valentino).

In June 2006, Marios participated in the International Song and Dance Festival "Konin 2006" in Konin, Poland among 2500 participants from 11 countries and won 2nd prize "Silver Prize" with the song "Congratulations" (Music: Christodoulos Siganos, Lyrics: Christodoulos Siganos & Valentino).

In July 2006, Marios invited to participate in the XV International Festival of Arts "Slavianski Bazaar" in Vitebsk, Belarus. He was accompanied by the National Concert Orchestra of Belarus conducted by Maestro Mikhail Finberg. He impressed the audience with his performance and sang Greek and Russian songs.

In August 2006, Marios participated in the International Song Festival "Ohrid 2006" in Ohrid, Macedonia. He was one of the 26 finalists from 11 countries. He won the 2nd prize from the Jury with the song "Congratulations" (Music: Christodoulos Siganos, Lyrics: Christodoulos Siganos & Valentino).

In September 2006, Marios participated in the International Pop Festival "Canzoni Dal Mondo" in Naples, Italy and won the 1st prize, "Best Song" among 10 countries with the song "Congratulations" (Music: Christodoulos Siganos, Lyrics: Christodoulos Siganos & Valentino).

In November 2006, he participated in the International Song Festival "Berliner Perle" in Berlin, Germany. He was one of the 19 finalists who pre-selected among 53 participations from 13 countries. He won the "Special Award by The Jury" as the best performance with the songs "Congratulations" (Music: Christodoulos Siganos, Lyrics: Christodoulos Siganos & Valentino) and "There’s no sunshine anymore" by Jon Secada in a new version.

In December 2006, Marios invited to represent Cyprus into the International TV Song Festival held in Malta where the Maltese audience appreciated his participation.

=== 2007 – Tours / Festivals / Awards ===
In April 2007, he took part in the 10th International Song Contest for youths "Tahtede Laul 2007" in Tallinn, Estonia. He won the award "Best Performance" with the song "There’s no sunshine anymore" by Jon Secada in a new version.

In May 2007, the organizing committee of the International Pop Song Festival "Discovery 2007" in Bulgaria invited Marios to participate as a guest. The audience and the media appreciated his impressive performance.

In July 2007, Marios participated in the International Music Festival "Universong" in Canary Islands, Spain. He won the 2nd prize (Silver Prize) "Best Singer" with the song "Congratulations" (Music: Christodoulos Siganos, Lyrics: Christodoulos Siganos & Valentino) among 12 countries.

== Awards ==
Year	Award(s)	Event	Place
1999	1st place	1st CyBC Pancyprian Song Contest	Cyprus
1999	1st place	Kataklysmos Festival	Cyprus
2004	8th place	Junior Eurovision Song Contest	Norway
2005	Special Award by the Jury	International Song Festival "Song-Magic"	Bulgaria
2005	Audience Award	International Song Festival "Palangos Gaida – 2005"	Lithuania
2005	3rd place Best Singer; Journalist Jury Award	International Song Festival "Universitalent"	Czech Republic
2006	2nd place Best Singer; Special Award by the Jury	International Pop Song Festival "Discovery 2006"	Bulgaria
2006	2nd place	International Song and Dance Festival "Konin 2006"	Poland
2006	2nd place	International Song Festival "Ohrid 2006"	Republic of Macedonia
2006	1st place Best Song	International Pop Song Festival "Canzoni Dal Mondo"	Italy
2007	Best Performance	International Song Contest "Tähtede Laul 2007"	Estonia
2007	2nd place Best Singer	International Music Festival "Universong"	Canary Islands

== See also ==
- Junior Eurovision Song Contest 2004
- Cyprus in the Eurovision Song Contest 2006

Awards and achievements
Preceded by Theodora Rafti with "Mia efhi"	Cyprus in the Junior Eurovision Song Contest; 2004	Succeeded by Luis Panagiotou and Christina Christofi with "Agoria koritsia"
