= Switzerland in the Junior Eurovision Song Contest =

- Junior Eurovision Song Contest
- Participating broadcaster: Swiss Broadcasting Corporation (SRG SSR)

Participation summary
- Appearances: 1
- First appearance: 2004
- Last appearance: 2004
- Highest placement: 16th: 2004
- Participation history: 2004; 2005 – 2025

Switzerland has been represented at the Junior Eurovision Song Contest once, in 2004. The Swiss participating broadcaster in the contest was the Swiss Broadcasting Corporation (SRG SSR). Its affiliate Radiotelevisione svizzera (RSI) was responsible for the selection process of its entry. Its only entry was "Birichino" by Demis Mirarchi, which finished in sixteenth place out of eighteen participating entries, achieving a score of four points. SRG SSR did not compete in subsequent editions due to financial difficulties.

== History ==
Italian-language broadcaster RTSI decided early on that due to budget issues, the winner of the 2002 local children's song contest Mara e Meo would represent the country at the Junior Eurovision Song Contest 2004. Although the EBU's rules at the time prohibited professional singers from entering, according to RTSI, the EBU had made an exception. Despite not being responsible for the country's entry, German and French-language broadcasters SRF and RTS relayed the contest with native language commentary.

The following year, due to financial difficulties, RTSI announced that they would be unable to participate in the contest without the participation of other broadcasters in Switzerland and the funding of the SRG SSR. RTSI reaffirmed this decision to press in 2016.

== Participation overview ==
Year	Artist	Song	Language	Place	Points
2004	Demis Mirarchi	"Birichino"	Italian	16	4

== Commentators and spokespeople ==
The contests are broadcast online worldwide through the official Junior Eurovision Song Contest website junioreurovision.tv and YouTube. In 2015, the online broadcasts featured commentary in English by junioreurovision.tv editor Luke Fisher and 2011 Bulgarian Junior Eurovision Song Contest entrant Ivan Ivanov. The Swiss Broadcasting Corporation, SRG SSR, sent their own commentators to the contest in order to provide commentary in the French, German, and Italian languages. Spokespersons were also chosen by the national broadcaster in order to announce the awarding points from Switzerland. The table below list the details of each commentator and spokesperson since 2004.

Year	Commentator			Spokesperson	Ref.
Year	SRF	RTS	RSI	Spokesperson	Ref.
2004	Roman Kilchsperger (SF2)	Marie-Thérèse Porchet (TSR 2)	Claudio Lazzarino and Daniele Rauseo (TSI 1)	Gaia Bertoncini	
2005–2026	No broadcast	Did not participate			

== See also ==
- Switzerland in the Eurovision Song Contest – Senior version of the Junior Eurovision Song Contest.
