= Macedonia in the Junior Eurovision Song Contest 2007 =

- Junior Eurovision Song Contest 2007
- Participating broadcaster: Macedonian Radio Television (MRT)
- Country: Macedonia
- Selection process: Juniorski Evrosong Nacionalen Izbor 2007
- Selection date: 6 October 2007

Competing entry
- Song: "Ding Ding Dong"
- Artist: Rosica Kulakova and Dimitar Stojmenovski
- Songwriters: Rosica Kulakova; Dimitar Stojmenovski

Placement
- Final result: 5th, 111 points

Participation chronology

Macedonia (Note: Presented under the provisional appellation "former Yugoslav Republic of Macedonia", abbreviated "FYR Macedonia".) was represented at the Junior Eurovision Song Contest 2007 with the song "Ding Ding Dong", written and performed by Rosica Kulakova and Dimitar Stojmenovski. The Macedonian participating broadcaster, Macedonian Radio Television (MRT), selected its entry for the contest through a national final called Juniorski Evrosong Nacionalen Izbor 2007.

== Before Junior Eurovision ==
=== Juniorski Evrosong Nacionalen Izbor 2007 ===
The running order draw for the national final was held on 11 September 2007 during the morning show Dzvon.

The final was held on 6 October 2007 in MRT Studios at 21:00 CET and was broadcast on MTV 1 and MKTV Sat. The hosts were Saško Kocev and Živkica Gjurčinovska. The final had 15 participants. The results were decided by 50% seven-member jury and 50% televoting.

Guest performers were Marija Arsovska and Zana Aliu singing their Eurovision songs, Martina Siljanovska with a song from her album, Denis Dimoski with multiple old Macedonian songs and ballet studio Eureka performing during the breaks. Toše Proeski was also supposed to perform as a guest but couldn't due to the fatigue and exhaustion from the concert the day prior, but he answered some participants questions via phone and wished them good luck.

Final – 6 October 2007
R/O	Artist	Song	Songwriter(s)	Jury	Televote	Total	Place
1	Kristina Kostovska	"Ponekogaš posakuvam" ("Понекогаш посакувам")	Kristina Kostovska	8	2	10	4
2	Devana Georgievska	"Eden kiss sladok kiss" ("Еден кисс сладок кисс")	Devana Georgievska	1	0	1	12
3	Iva Zdravkovic and Natalija Jančevska	"Slatki devojki" ("Слатки девојки")	Vesna Siljanova	0	0	0	13
4	Nikola Trenčevski	"Fraer sum jas" ("Фраер сум јас")	Nikola Trenčevski	4	3	7	8
5	Rosica Kulakova and Dimitar Stojmenovski	"Ding Ding Dong" ("Динг Динг Донг")	Rosica Kulakova; Dimitar Stojmenovski	12	12	24	1
6	Mila Zafirovic	"Vo ritamot na srca dve" ("Во ритамот на срца две")	Mila Zafirovic	6	8	14	2
7	Tamara Kičukova, Renata Mitevska and Mihaela Stojanovska	"Ajde vo disko" ("Ајде во диско")	Tamara Kičukova	2	6	8	7
8	Nataša Latinovska and Ilaria Kirilov	"Glavobolka" ("Главоболка")	Nataša Latinovska	0	0	0	13
9	Nevena Cvetanova and Olja Stojkovska	"Ne znam što mi e" ("Не знам што ми е")	Martina	0	0	0	13
10	Emilia Langovska	"Bidi srekjen" ("Биди среќен")	Emilia Langovska	3	4	7	8
11	Magdalena Mitrovska	"Sekoj ima eden dom" ("Секој има еден дом")	Magdalena Mitrovska	10	0	10	4
12	Sara Markoska	"Misliš na mene" ("Мислиш на мене")	Sara Markoska	7	7	14	2
13	Marija Zafirovska	"Mojata muzika" ("Мојата музика")	Marija Zafirovska	5	1	6	10
14	Magdalena Stoilkovska	"Ritam i muzika" ("Ритам и музика")	Magdalena Stoilkovska	0	10	10	4
15	Emilija Jusuf and Sara Saramardžiska	"Svetot e moj" ("Светот е мој")	Emilija Jusuf; Sara Samardžiska	0	5	5	11

== At Junior Eurovision ==
At the running order draw on 29 and 30 October 2007, Macedonia was drawn to perform eleventh, following the Netherlands and preceding Ukraine.

=== Voting ===
Points awarded to Macedonia
Score	Country
12 points (Note: All countries received one set of 12 points to ensure no country finished with nul points.)	Bulgaria; Serbia
10 points	Portugal; Romania
8 points	Belarus
7 points	Armenia; Malta; Sweden
6 points	
5 points	Georgia; Lithuania; Russia; Ukraine
4 points	
3 points	Belgium; Cyprus
2 points	
1 point	

Points awarded by Macedonia
Score	Country
12 points	Serbia
10 points	Russia
8 points	Belarus
7 points	Bulgaria
6 points	Sweden
5 points	Georgia
4 points	Malta
3 points	Romania
2 points	Lithuania
1 point	Ukraine
