= Nevena Božović =

Serbian singer-songwriter

- Невена Божовић
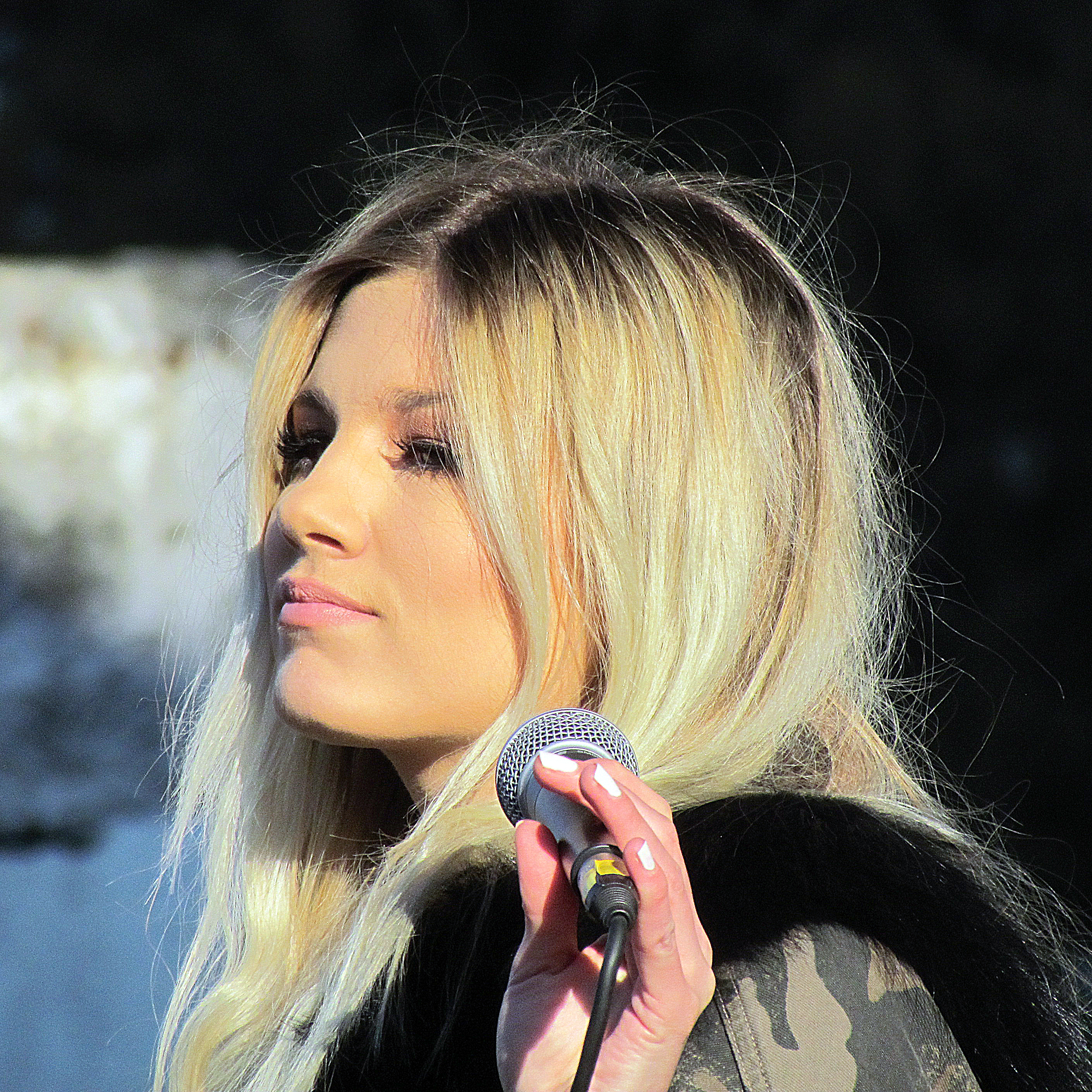
- Božović performing at charity concert "Ulice otvorenog srca" in 2017
- Born: 15 June 1994 (age 32); Kosovska Mitrovica, FR Yugoslavia
- Spouse: Nikola Ivanović (m. 2019)
- Children: 1
- Musical career
- Genres: Pop; dance; ballad
- Occupations: Singer; songwriter
- Instrument: Vocals
- Years active: 2007–present
- Website: www.nevenabozovic.com

Nevena Ivanović (Serbian Cyrillic: Невена Ивановић, pronounced [něvena ǐvanovitɕ]; née Božović [Божовић] [bôːʒovitɕ]; born 15 June 1994) is a Serbian singer and songwriter. She made her singing debut by representing Serbia at the Junior Eurovision Song Contest 2007 with song "Piši mi", placing third. Božović rose to prominence as the runner-up on the televised singing competition Prvi glas Srbije in 2012.

The following year, Božović and two other finalists, Mirna Radulović and Sara Jovanović, formed a female group Moje 3 and represented Serbia at the Eurovision Song Contest 2013 with song "Ljubav je svuda", failing to reach the finals. She was the first artist to ever compete in both the Eurovision Song Contest and Junior Eurovision Song Contests as a main performer. Božović competed in the Eurovision Song Contest 2019 again as a solo artist with the song "Kruna", finishing 18th.

== Life and career ==
=== Early life ===
Nevena Božović was born in Kosovska Mitrovica, FR Yugoslavia, where she also attended school. Her parents are Ružica, a professor of technical sciences, and Zoran, a former basketball player. Nevena once said that her main role model was her sister Jelena, and that Nevena skipped a grade to be able to study together with her sister. Božović studied music at the University of Arts in Belgrade and in 2019 finished her specialization in solfeggio.

=== Career beginnings ===
Božović competed at multiple youth festivals such as "Cvrkuti sa Ibra" - with song "Ti nisi moj broj" (You Are Not My number), "Čarolija", "Svetosavski festival u Zrenjaninu" and "Dečji festival u Kruševcu", receiving awards in all of them. In 2007, Božović participated in Izbor za dečju pesmu Evrovizije, Serbia's national selection for Junior Eurovision with "Piši mi" (Write Me), a ballad with self-written lyrics and music. On the final night, she was placed first by both, juries and televote, and went on to Rotterdam, Netherlands to represent Serbia.

=== Junior Eurovision Song Contest 2007 ===
On 8 December, Božović was ranked third overall with a total of 120 points, making that Serbia's best result in the contest. The performance was marked by two ballerinas that danced in the background. Serbia, along with Russia, was the only contestant to receive points from all the participating countries.

=== Prvi glas Srbije ===
In 2012, Božović took part in Serbia's version of The Voice called Prvi glas Srbije. After three months of live shows, constant battles and challenges, Božović qualified for the final, where she ranked second after Mirna Radulović.

=== Eurovision Song Contest 2013 ===
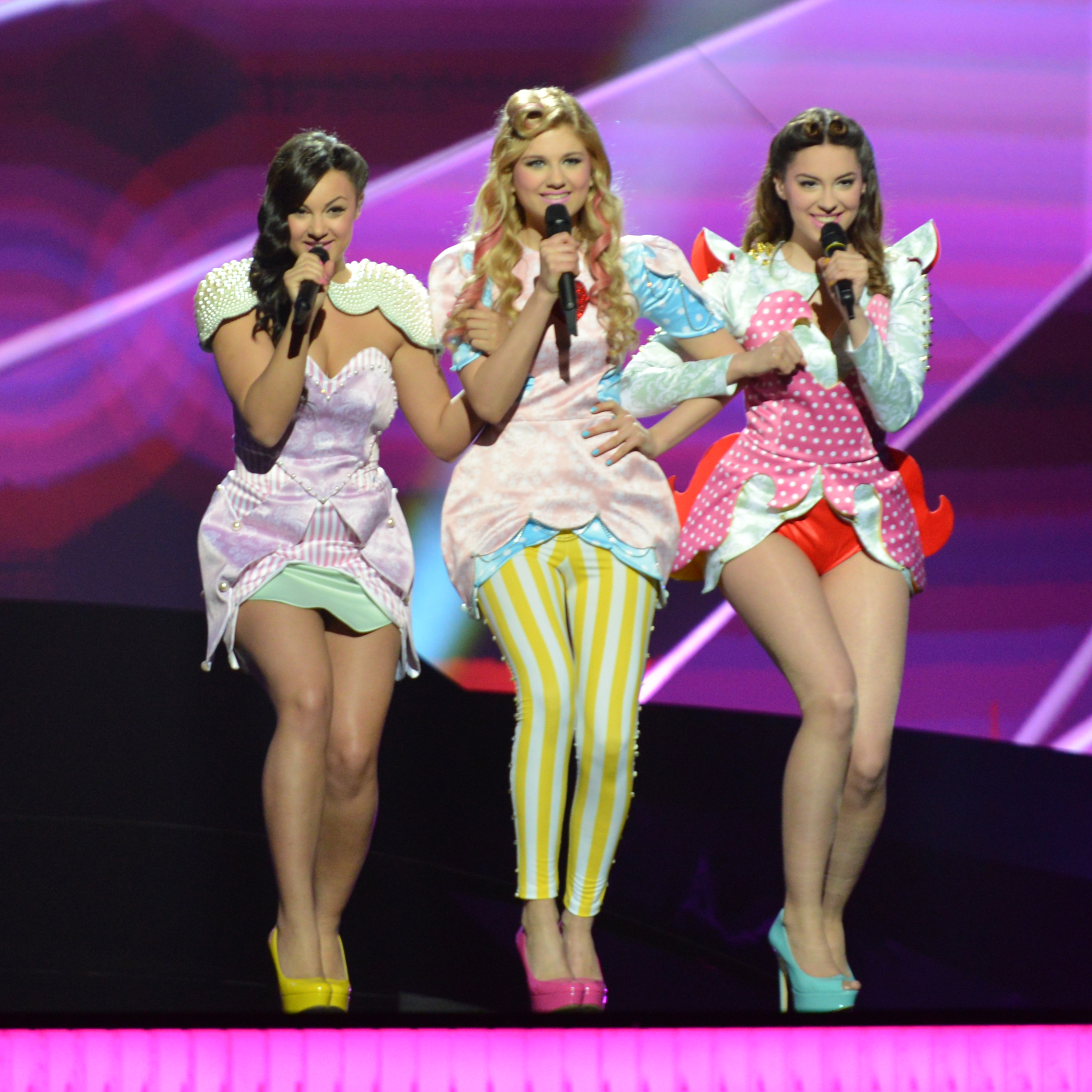
Božović (middle) with Moje 3 in the Eurovision Song Contest 2013 in Malmö, Sweden.

In 2013, together with former participants of Prvi Glas - Mirna Radulović and Sara Jovanović, Nevena took part in Beosong 2013 with "Ljubav je Svuda" (Love Is All Around). The trio won the contest with over 25,000 votes and went on to represent Serbia in the Eurovision Song Contest 2013 in Malmö, where they, under a new name Moje 3, performed in the first semi-final and finished eleventh, missing out on the final by six points. The group won the Barbara Dex Award for that year.

=== Breakthrough in solo career ===
That same year, on 15 July, Božović presented her new single "Pogledaj me" (Look At Me), written by Aleksandra Kovač. In late December, she performed another new single "Znam da noćas gubim te" (I Know I'm Losing You Tonight) on talk show "Veče sa Ivanom Ivanovićem". The music video was filmed in Kopaonik and published on 10 February 2014. This was the first music video on her official YouTube channel (Nevena Bozovic Official).

She appeared at the festival "Proleće u Beogradu" (Spring in Belgrade) with song "Tačka" (Dot), after which she released the song "Bal" written by Aleksandra Milutinović. The song's music video starred Serbian actor Miloš Biković and was filmed at Ada Bojana.

At the beginning of May 2015, she published a new song "Trebam tebe" (I Need You) and an official video that was filmed at Vila Danica in Bela Crkva, Banat. This time, Miloš Biković was replaced by Croatian model Vlaho Arbulić. The song was autobiographical, as Nevena stated This is it, this is me.

=== Eurovision Song Contest 2015 and opening act for Indila ===
In the Eurovision Song Contest 2015 in Vienna, she was one of the five jurors for the Serbian jury panel, alongside Dejan Cukić, Marko Kon, Saša Milošević and Ksenija Milošević.

On 26 May 2015, Nevena, alongside Sara Jovanović and group Zemlja gruva, was a part of the opening act for a concert of a French singer Indila, which was held in Štark Arena in Belgrade.

=== Career establishment and Slavianski Bazaar ===
Nevena continued her collaboration with Aleksandra Milutinović, who contributed by writing music, lyrics and arrangement for her new song "Čujem da dolaziš u grad" (I Hear You're Coming to Town), which was published just seven days before the end of 2015.

After yet another appearance at the festival "Proleće u Beogradu" (Spring in Belgrade), this time with song "Moja baka" (My Grandmother), she released her next song "Siesta", collaborating with Goran Kovačić and Ljiljana Jorgovanović for the first time ever, while Darko Dimitrov returned after the song "Bal" and became a regular part of her music team. The song was published at the end of 2016.

In June, parallel with finishing her master's degree at the University of Arts in Belgrade, Nevena appeared at the festival "Proleće u Beogradu" (Spring in Belgrade) for the third time, this time with song "Đuskaj" (Dance). In the middle of July 2017, she competed in Belarusian Vitebsk at famous festival Slavianski Bazaar in Vitebsk, which gathers participants from all Eastern Europe to celebrate Slavic music. Nevena had the highest number of points on the first day of the final round (76) and eventually finished in third place performing a rendition of Christina Aguilera’s "Hurt", two points fewer than the winner (149).

=== MAC Music Awards Ceremony and Magic Records ===
On 11 June 2017, Nevena, in cooperation with her new publishing company Magic Records, presented her new single "Jasno mi je" (It's Clear to Me). Three days later she published the English version called "Dangerous Drug".

The recognition for the big hit arrived at the inaugural edition of the 2019 Music Awards Ceremony where she won the award for best Electropop song of the year. The song also appeared at OGAE Song Contest 2017, being ranked 26th out of 28 songs.

She continued her collaboration with Magic Records with a single "Moja molitva" (My Prayer), which received its English version "What I'm Looking For" later on.

=== Beovizija and Eurovision Song Contest 2019 ===
Slightly before her participation at Beovizija, Nevena published a music video for song "Prazni snovi" (Empty Dreams), which was used in the movie Psi umiru sami.

She competed in Beovizija 2019 with "Kruna". Having won her semifinal four points ahead of Dženan Lončarević, she went to the final and won the whole competition, thus receiving the rights to represent Serbia in the Eurovision Song Contest 2019. She received the most points from the jury panel and was ranked third by televote.

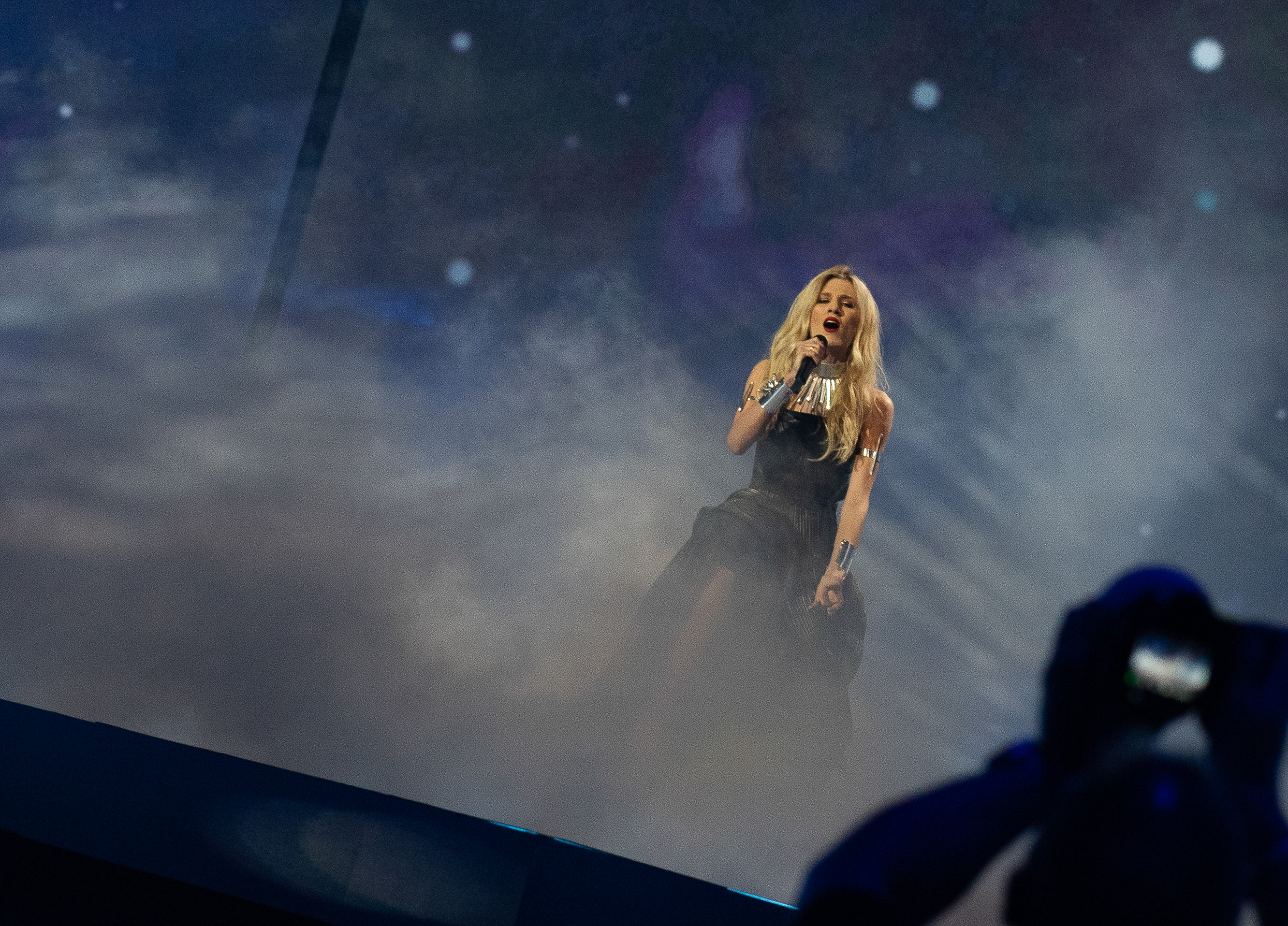
Božović performing "Kruna" in the Eurovision Song Contest 2019 in Tel Aviv, Israel.

On the 11 April 2019, the acoustic version of the song was released, as well as the backing vocals for the song. Ivana Vladović, Olga Popović, Dušan Alagić and Mladen Lukić, all experienced and famous musicians, were announced to travel with Nevena to Tel Aviv. Less than two weeks before her semifinal, Nevena also released an English version of the song named "Eternal Light", which was performed alongside Symphony Orchestra of Radio Television of Serbia, but stated that the song was released purely and entirely for promotional purposes.

Kruna went on to finish 18th place overall with 89 points.

=== Singer of the Year and concert in Budva ===
Nevena won yet another award just after she returned from Israel. Naxi radio, radio station that announces the most significant radio awards in Balkan, on their webpage published a poll for six categories, including the one for Best female singer of the Year. Based on the votes of listeners, after one month of voting, Nevena was announced as the winner in front of Aleksandra Radović, Jelena Tomašević, Nina Badrić and Severina respectively making her the youngest singer ever to win that award. She thanked the fans on her social media page showcasing her award.

Her last song of the year "Sanjam" (I Dream) was released in the middle of October, reaching over 100,000 views on YouTube in less than ten days. After "Kruna", this is the second song for which she wrote lyrics and music.

She ended the year with a 90-minute performance, an opening act for a huge Balkan star Zdravko Čolić, on 31 December in Budva.

=== 2020–present: Best music collaboration and upcoming album ===
On 27 February 2020 Nevena released yet another ballad song for which she wrote lyrics and music, called "Nestajem s vetrom" (I Disappear With the Wind). That same day she performed her new song live on radio station Naxi Radio, while on 8 June she performed new single on TV show "Jutro na Prvoj". The song won her yet another award from Naxi radio, this time in category Best music collaboration in front of many famous artists by margin of 46.32 percent. She thanked the fans for the voting and praised Dušan Alagić for perfect collaboration.

In the middle of the year, on 15 July, Nevena participated in the show "Zvezde pevaju zvezde xtra" where she made her own version of the song "Produži dalje" (Carry On) by Zdravko Čolić.

After a long period without releasing new songs, on 20 March Nevena released her first song in 2021 called "Ljubi" (Kiss). Song has written by Milenko Škarić and Teodora Kunić, who also wrote the lyrics.

Just days after Nevena announced her pregnancy, she released song "Ne čuješ me" (You Don't Hear Me) in cooperation with Sky Music Entertainment. Music was written by herself, Vladimir Danilović wrote the lyrics, while Darko Dimitrov made an arrangement. Disco music from 80's is my biggest inspiration in recent times because it is one of the best music periods. I also like the visuality of the 80's, how women's looked alike in that time, she explained and added that her music album should be released until the end of the year.

== Personal life ==
When she was a child, she played basketball. Her main concern at the time was whether to become a professional basketball player or a singer and pianist, eventually deciding to become a singer. She has been a vegetarian since she was 13. Media linked her to Miloš Biković after his appearance in music video "Bal", even more so after Nevena stated I'm really in love, although she denied any romantic relationship with Miloš.

On the 20 April 2019, Nevena married Montenegrin pilot Nikola Ivanović. The wedding took place in Budva, where Nikola is from. Montenegrin media described their wedding as the Wedding of the Year.

After months of speculation, Nevena on 29 June 2021 announced that she was pregnant and was expecting a daughter in August. She gave birth to Anka on 23 August.

== Discography ==
=== Singles ===
Title	Year	Album
"Piši mi"	2007	Non-album singles
"Ti"	2009	Non-album singles
"Ljubav je svuda" (as a part of Moje 3)	2013	Non-album singles
"Pogledaj me"	2013	Non-album singles
"Znam da noćas gubim te"	2013	Non-album singles
"Bal"	2014	Non-album singles
"Trebam tebe"	2015	Non-album singles
"Čujem da dolaziš u grad"	2015	Non-album singles
"Siesta"	2016	Non-album singles
"Jasno mi je"	2017	Non-album singles
"Dangerous Drug"	2017	Non-album singles
"Moja molitva"	2017	Non-album singles
"What I'm Looking For"	2018	Non-album singles
"Prazni snovi"	2019	Non-album singles
"Kruna"	2019	Non-album singles
"The Crown - Eternal Light"	2019	Non-album singles
"Sanjam"	2019	Non-album singles
"Nestajem s vetrom"	2020	Non-album singles
"Ljubav u bojama"	2020	Non-album singles
"Produži dalje (Zdravko Čolić cover)"	2020	Non-album singles
"Ljubi"	2021	Non-album singles
"Ne čuješ me"	2021	Non-album singles
"Ogledalo"	2023	Non-album singles

== See also ==
- Music of Serbia

Awards and achievements
Preceded by Neustrašivi učitelji stranih jezika	Serbia in the Junior Eurovision Song Contest; 2007	Succeeded by Maja Mazić
Preceded by Željko Joksimović with "Nije ljubav stvar"	Serbia in the Eurovision Song Contest (as part of Moje 3); 2013	Succeeded by Bojana Stamenov with "Beauty Never Lies"
Preceded by Sanja Ilić & Balkanika with "Nova deca"	Serbia in the Eurovision Song Contest; 2019	Succeeded by Hurricane with "Hasta la vista"
