= Žar ptica =

Žar ptica may refer to:

- Žar ptica, a South Slavic term for the firebird, a mythological being in Slavic folklore
- Žar ptica (album), a 2009 release by Serbian singer Aleksandra Radović
- City Theatre Žar ptica, a theatre in Kozjak, Zagreb
