= Serbia in the Junior Eurovision Song Contest 2007 =

Serbian Eurovision Song Contest entry

- Junior Eurovision Song Contest 2007
- Country: Serbia
- Selection process: National Final
- Selection date: 7 October 2007

Competing entry
- Song: "Piši mi"
- Artist: Nevena Božović

Placement
- Final result: 3rd, 120 points

Participation chronology

Serbia selected their Junior Eurovision entry for 2007 through a national final consisting of 10 songs. The winning song was selected by televoting and jury voting, which was Nevena Božović with "Piši mi".

== Before Junior Eurovision ==
=== National final ===
Ten songs competed during the final at the Millennium Hall in Vršac on 7 October 2007, hosted by Miki Damjanović, Ksenija, Blanka and Duška Vučinić-Lučić. The winner was decided by a combination of votes from a jury panel, consisting of Bebi Dol, Slobodan Marković, Dragana Jovanović, Vladimir Graić and Vladana Marković, and the Serbian public. "Piši mi" performed by Nevena Božović was selected as the winner.

Draw	Artist	Song	Jury	Televote		Total	Place
Draw	Artist	Song	Jury	Votes	Points	Total	Place
1	Gorana Jablanović	"Lava ispod kože" (Лава испод коже)	7	58	1	8	7
2	Zone 2 Girls	"Putujmo" (Путујмо)	5	151	5	10	6
3	Milica Dmitrašinović	"Al ne da mama" (Ал не да мама)	2	73	2	4	10
4	Luna Park	"Zemljotres" (Земљотрес)	3	138	4	7	8
5	Katarina Otašević	"Tinejdžerske muke" (Тинејџерске муке)	10	211	6	16	3
6	Iva Blažić	"Srce moje" (Срце моје)	6	507	10	16	2
7	Nevena Božović	"Piši mi" (Пиши ми)	12	838	12	24	1
8	Karolina Lodi	"Koliko je sati" (Колико је сати)	8	232	7	15	4
9	Aleksandra Mitrović	"Žurka na plaži" (Журка на плажи)	4	269	8	12	5
10	Teodora & Emilija Dželatović	"Ljubav i muzika" (Љубав и музика)	1	126	3	4	9

== At Junior Eurovision ==
=== Voting ===
Points awarded to Serbia
Score	Country
12 points (Note: All countries received one set of 12 points to ensure no country finished with nul points.)	Macedonia; Sweden
10 points	
8 points	Netherlands
7 points	Georgia; Portugal; Russia
6 points	Belarus; Belgium; Cyprus; Greece; Lithuania; Malta; Ukraine
5 points	Romania
4 points	Armenia; Bulgaria
3 points	
2 points	
1 point	

Points awarded by Serbia
Score	Country
12 points	Macedonia
10 points	Russia
8 points	Belarus
7 points	Bulgaria
6 points	Sweden
5 points	Armenia
4 points	Romania
3 points	Lithuania
2 points	Malta
1 point	Ukraine
