= Romania in the Junior Eurovision Song Contest 2007 =

- Junior Eurovision Song Contest 2007
- Country: Romania
- Selection process: Selecţia Naţională Eurovision Junior 2007
- Selection date: 24 June 2007

Competing entry
- Song: "Sha-la-la"
- Artist: 4Kids

Placement
- Final result: 10th, 54 points

Participation chronology

Romania was represented by 4Kids at the Junior Eurovision Song Contest 2007 with the song "Sha-la-la". The song was selected as the winner of the Romanian national final Selecţia Naţională Eurovision Junior 2007, held on 24 June 2007.

== Before Junior Eurovision ==
=== Selecţia Naţională Eurovision Junior 2007 ===
The final took place on 24 June 2007 and was broadcast on TVR 1 and TVRi. Originally Ioana Veronica Ciornea was to take part in the national final with the song “Spune da” but withdrew due to medical reasons. 14 songs took part and the winner was determined by a 50/50 combination of votes from a jury panel and a public televote. The winner was "Sha-la-la" performed by 4Kids, receiving the maximum points from both the jury and the televoters.

Final – 24 June 2007
| Draw | Artist | Song | Points | Place |
|---|---|---|---|---|
| 1 | Alexandra Mera | "În jurul lumii" | 6 | 9 |
| 2 | A+ | "Fetita deocheata" | 5 | 10 |
| 3 | Andrei Loica | "Zbor" | 10 | 4 |
| 4 | Karina Ghita | "Bum, bum, bum" | 0 | 13 |
| 5 | Fifty-Fifty | "Ma dusei ziua la coasa" | 5 | 11 |
| 6 | Gabriela Alexandra Mateiuc | "Mama nu stie" | 7 | 8 |
| 7 | Chic | "Suntem mereu OK" | 8 | 5 |
| 8 | D@D | "Duby Duby" | 8 | 6 |
| 9 | Ovidiu Lazar | "Putem fi prieteni" | 16 | 2 |
| 10 | R.B.L. | "Rebele" | 16 | 3 |
| 11 | Iporti | "Rock si Cha-Cha" | 0 | 14 |
| 12 | Norina Sânziana Niculae | "Trece" | 8 | 7 |
| 13 | 4Kids | "Sha-la-la" | 24 | 1 |
| 14 | Iulian Pânzaru Stanescu | "Asta-s eu" | 3 | 12 |
| — | Ioana Veronica Ciornea | ”Spune da” | — | — |

== At Junior Eurovision ==
=== Voting ===
Points awarded to Romania
| Score | Country |
|---|---|
| 12 points (Note: All countries received one set of 12 points to ensure no country finished with nul points.) | |
| 10 points | |
| 8 points | Cyprus; Portugal |
| 7 points | Bulgaria |
| 6 points | |
| 5 points | Malta |
| 4 points | Serbia |
| 3 points | Macedonia |
| 2 points | Belarus; Greece |
| 1 point | Lithuania; Russia; Sweden |

Points awarded by Romania
| Score | Country |
|---|---|
| 12 points | Armenia |
| 10 points | Macedonia |
| 8 points | Bulgaria |
| 7 points | Belarus |
| 6 points | Sweden |
| 5 points | Serbia |
| 4 points | Georgia |
| 3 points | Russia |
| 2 points | Malta |
| 1 point | Ukraine |
