= Belgium in the Junior Eurovision Song Contest 2007 =

- Junior Eurovision Song Contest 2007
- Participating broadcaster: Vlaamse Radio- en Televisieomroeporganisatie (VRT)
- Country: Belgium
- Selection process: Junior Eurosong 2007
- Selection date: 29 September 2007

Competing entry
- Song: "Anders"
- Artist: Trust
- Songwriters: Mirek Coutigny; Laurens Platteeuw; Matthieu Renier; Eva Storme

Placement
- Final result: 15th, 19 points

Participation chronology

Belgium was represented at the Junior Eurovision Song Contest 2007 with the song "Anders", written by Mirek Coutigny, Laurens Platteeuw, Matthieu Renier, and Eva Storme, and performed by the band Trust. The Dutch participating broadcaster, Vlaamse Radio- en Televisieomroeporganisatie (VRT), selected its entry for the contest through Junior Eurosong 2007. The national competition consisted of nine songs competing over three stages.

== Before Eurovision ==
=== Junior Eurosong 2007 ===
Junior Eurosong 2007 was the national final organised by Vlaamse Radio- en Televisieomroeporganisatie (VRT) to select its entry for the Junior Eurovision Song Contest 2007.

==== Format ====
The format of the competition consisted of three shows: one quarter-final, one semi-final and a final. All shows were hosted by Ben Roelants.

Results during the quarter-final and the semi-final shows were determined by the three-member jury panel and votes from the public. In the quarter-final, the songs first faced a public televote where the top five entries qualified. The jury then selected an additional qualifier from the remaining entries to proceed in the competition. In the semi-final, the songs first faced a public televote where the top three entries qualified. The jury then selected an additional qualifier from the remaining entries to proceed in the competition. In the final, public televoting exclusively determined the winner.

The jury participated in each show by providing feedback to the competing artists and selecting entries to advance in the competition. The panel consists of:

- Karen Damen
- Stijn Kolacny
- Heidi Lenaerts

==== Quarter-final ====
The quarter-final took place on 8 September 2007. Six entries qualified to the final. The nine competing entries first faced a public televote where the top five songs advanced. An additional qualifier was selected from the remaining four entries by the jury.

Televote qualifier
Jury qualifier

Quarter-final – 8 September 2007
R/O	Artist	Song	Result
1	Mijn broer en ik	"Knallen"	Advanced
2	Mona	"Alleen"	Eliminated
3	De Juffra's	"Te schoon voor u"	Advanced
4	Trust	"Anders"	Advanced
5	Jasper	"Weekend"	Advanced
6	De Dalton Sisters	"Verander de wereld"	Advanced
7	Swing	"Nu is het feest"	Eliminated
8	Larissa	"Blijf bij mij"	Eliminated
9	Bab	"Laat mij gerust"	Advanced

==== Semi-final ====
The semi-final took place on 15 September 2007. Four entries qualified to the final. The six competing entries first faced a public televote where the top three songs advanced. An additional qualifier was selected from the remaining three entries by the jury.

Televote qualifier
Jury qualifier

Semi-final – 15 September 2007
R/O	Artist	Song	Result
1	Bab	"Laat mij gerust"	Advanced
2	Jasper	"Weekend"	Eliminated
3	De Juffra's	"Te schoon voor u"	Eliminated
4	De Dalton Sisters	"Verander de wereld"	Advanced
5	Trust	"Anders"	Advanced
6	Mijn broer en ik	"Knallen"	Advanced

==== Final ====
The final took place on 22 September 2007. "Anders" performed by Trust was selected as the winner after accumulating the highest number of televotes.

Final – 22 September 2007
R/O	Artist	Song	Place
1	De Dalton Sisters	"Verander de wereld"	—N/a
2	Bab	"Laat mij gerust"	2
3	Mijn broer en ik	"Knallen"	—N/a
4	Trust	"Anders"	1

== At Eurovision ==
At Junior Eurovision, Belgium performed in second position, before Armenia and after Georgia. Belgium placed in 15th position with 19 points; the highest of which was 7 points, which came from the Netherlands, and was the only country that awarded points to Belgium.

=== Voting ===
Points awarded to Belgium
Score	Country
12 points (Note: All countries received one set of 12 points to ensure no country finished with nul points.)	
10 points	
8 points	
7 points	Netherlands
6 points	
5 points	
4 points	
3 points	
2 points	
1 point	

Points awarded by Belgium
Score	Country
12 points	Armenia
10 points	Netherlands
8 points	Sweden
7 points	Bulgaria
6 points	Serbia
5 points	Belarus
4 points	Georgia
3 points	Macedonia
2 points	Russia
1 point	Lithuania
