= Georgia in the Junior Eurovision Song Contest 2007 =

- Junior Eurovision Song Contest 2007
- Country: Georgia
- Selection process: National Final
- Selection date: 5 October 2007

Competing entry
- Song: "Odelia Ranuni"
- Artist: Mariam Romelashvili

Placement
- Final result: 4th, 116 points

Participation chronology

Georgia was represented at the Junior Eurovision Song Contest 2007 which took place on 8 December 2007, in Rotterdam, Netherlands. Georgian Public Broadcaster (GPB) was responsible for organising their entry for the contest. Mariam Romelashvili was externally selected to represent Georgia with the song "Odelia Ranuni". Georgia placed fourth with 116 points.

== Before Junior Eurovision ==
=== National final ===
Prior to the national selection, a six-member jury consisting of Dato Archvadze, Maka Aroshidze, Tamar Chokhonelidze, Nutsa Janelidze, Tamar Kintsurashvili and Jemal Sepiashvili auditioned a total of 140 acts and selected twelve finalists to compete in a national final on 5 October 2007 held at the Tbilisi Philharmonics Big Hall. The winner was Mariam Romelashvili with the song "Odelia Ranuni".

| Draw | Artist | Song |
|---|---|---|
| 1 | Otiko Andriadze | "Ria-Ria" |
| 2 | Linda Turkoshvili | "Chemi varskvlavi me unda avanto" |
| 3 | Ilia Karmazashvili | "Saqme da roki" |
| 4 | Ana Gibradze | "Chven gavfrindebit" |
| 5 | Mari Jomardidze | "Dedamitsa" |
| 6 | NinoMariKeti | "Oqou" |
| 7 | Beka Chokharadze | "Taramtaram" |
| 8 | Ia Orjonikidze | "Peplebis roki" |
| 9 | Shotiko Tatishvili | "Chemi simghera" |
| 10 | Mariam Romelashvili | "Odelia Ranuni" |
| 11 | Ana Siradze | "Pheradi sizmari" |
| 12 | Aneti Mikeladze | "Gaighimet kvelam" |

== Artist and song information ==
=== Mariam Romelashvili ===
Mariam Romelashvili
- Origin: Georgia
- Genres: Pop
- Occupation: Singer-songwriter
- Instrument: Vocals

The winning contestant, Mariam Romelashvili, is a singer from Georgia, and is notable for having starred in the 2008 documentary "Sounds Like Teen Spirit", detailing the events of the Junior Eurovision Song Contest 2007 for the participants.

=== Odelia Ranuni ===
(Georgia (country)) "Odelia Ranuni"

Junior Eurovision Song Contest 2007 entry
- Country: Georgia
- Artist: Mariam Romelashvili
- Languages: Georgian
- Composer: Mariam Romelashvili
- Lyricist: Mariam Romelashvili

Finals performance
- Final result: 4th
- Final points: 116

Entry chronology
- "Bzz.." (2008) ►

"Odelia Ranuni" is a song by Georgian singer Mariam Romelashvili. It represented Georgia during the Junior Eurovision Song Contest 2007. It placed fourth in a draw of seventeen entries.

== At Junior Eurovision ==
During the running order draw which took place on 29 October 2007, Georgia was drawn to perform first on 8 December 2007, preceding Belgium.

=== Final ===
During the final, Mariam Romelashvili performed amongst six background dancers, who wore white outfits of red and white, the colours of the Georgian Flag. Mariam Romelashvili placed fourth at the Junior Eurovision Song Contest 2007, receiving 116 points for her song "Odelia Ranuni".

=== Voting ===
Points awarded to Georgia
| Score | Country |
|---|---|
| 12 points (Note: All countries received one set of 12 points to ensure no country finished with nul points.) | Armenia |
| 10 points | Cyprus; Lithuania; Malta |
| 8 points | Greece; Russia; Ukraine |
| 7 points | |
| 6 points | Netherlands |
| 5 points | Belarus; Bulgaria; Macedonia; Sweden |
| 4 points | Belgium; Portugal; Romania |
| 3 points | |
| 2 points | |
| 1 point | |

Points awarded by Georgia
| Score | Country |
|---|---|
| 12 points | Armenia |
| 10 points | Ukraine |
| 8 points | Lithuania |
| 7 points | Serbia |
| 6 points | Bulgaria |
| 5 points | Macedonia |
| 4 points | Belarus |
| 3 points | Netherlands |
| 2 points | Sweden |
| 1 point | Russia |
