= Cyprus in the Junior Eurovision Song Contest 2007 =

- Junior Eurovision Song Contest 2007
- Participating broadcaster: Cyprus Broadcasting Corporation (CyBC)
- Country: Cyprus
- Selection process: National final
- Selection date: 29 September 2007

Competing entry
- Song: "I mousiki dinei ftera"
- Artist: Yiorgos Ioannides
- Songwriter: Yiorgos Ioannides

Placement
- Final result: 14th, 29 points

Participation chronology

Cyprus was represented at the Junior Eurovision Song Contest 2007 with the song "I mousiki dinei ftera", written and performed by Yiorgos Ioannides. The Cypriot participating broadcaster, the Cyprus Broadcasting Corporation (CyBC), selected its entry for the contest through a national final.

== Before Junior Eurovision ==
=== National final ===
The Cyprus Broadcasting Corporation (CyBC) opened the submission window for the national final from 25 until 29 July 2007. By the deadline, 25 submissions were received, from which eight acts were chosen for the final by a four-member jury. The competing acts song titles were revealed on 4 September 2007 with the participants being revealed on 21 September 2007.

The final was held on 29 September 2007 in the Studio 3 of CyBC at 20:15 CEST and was broadcast on RIK 1 and RIK Sat. The show was hosted by Giannis Charalambous. The results were decided by 50% jury and 50% televoting. Guest performers included Luis Panagiotou and Christina Christofi with a remix version of "Agoria koritsia".

Final – 29 September 2007
R/O	Artist	Song	Jury	Televote		Total	Place
R/O	Artist	Song	Jury	Votes	Points	Total	Place
1	Giannis Karagiannis	"Chrysa ftera" ("Χρυσά φτερά")	8	1,609	2	10	3
2	Eleana Petrou, Emily Leandrou, Eva Konstantinou and Margarita Charalambous	"Mia zoi olo rythmo" ("Μια ζωή όλο ρυθμό")	1	2,456	5	6	8
3	Giorgos Ioannou	"S.O.S."	6	1,481	1	7	5
4	Christodoula Tsaggara	"Soste to perivallon" ("Σώστε το περιβάλλον")	4	1,757	3	7	5
5	Yiorgos Ioannides	"I mousiki dinei ftera" ("Η μουσική δίνει φτερά")	10	2,820	8	18	1
6	Dimitra Eleftheriadou, Georgia Efthymiadou, Stefani Neofytou and Nakis Kyriakou	"Paidiki zografia" ("Παιδική ζωγραφιά")	5	3,341	10	15	2
7	Elena Mannouri	"I zoi mas mia mousiki" ("Η ζωή μας μια μουσική")	2	2,663	6	8	4
8	Antonis Poullis	"Thelo na grapso melodia" ("Θέλω να γράψω μελωδία")	3	2,400	4	7	5

== At Junior Eurovision ==
At the running order draw on 29 and 30 October 2007, Cyprus was drawn to perform fourth, following Armenia and preceding Portugal.

=== Voting ===
Points awarded to Cyprus
Score	Country
12 points (Note: All countries received one set of 12 points to ensure no country finished with nul points.)	Greece
10 points	
8 points	
7 points	
6 points	
5 points	Armenia
4 points	
3 points	
2 points	
1 point	

Points awarded by Cyprus
Score	Country
12 points	Armenia
10 points	Georgia
8 points	Romania
7 points	Bulgaria
6 points	Serbia
5 points	Russia
4 points	Netherlands
3 points	Macedonia
2 points	Greece
1 point	Portugal
