= Bulgaria in the Junior Eurovision Song Contest 2007 =

- Junior Eurovision Song Contest 2007
- Participating broadcaster: Bulgarian National Television (BNT)
- Country: Bulgaria
- Selection process: Konkurs za Bŭlgarska detska pesen na Evroviziya 2007
- Selection date: 29 September 2007

Competing entry
- Song: "Bonbolandiya"
- Artist: Bon-Bon
- Songwriters: Bon-Bon

Placement
- Final result: 7th, 86 points

Participation chronology

Bulgaria was represented at the Junior Eurovision Song Contest 2007 with the song "Bonbolandiya", written and performed by Bon-Bon. The Bulgarian participating broadcaster, Bulgarian National Television (BNT), selected its entry for the contest through a national final, which was held on 29 September 2007. This was the first-ever entry from Bulgaria in the Junior Eurovision Song Contest.

== Before Junior Eurovision ==
=== Konkurs za Bŭlgarska detska pesen na Evroviziya 2007 ===
By the submission window deadline, the Bulgarian National Television (BNT) had received eighteen entries for the national final, from which ten were chosen to be as the finalists.

The final took place on 29 September 2007 at 17:30 CEST at the Hall 2 of the National Palace of Culture in Sofia and was broadcast on Channel 1 and TV Bulgaria. The show was hosted by Doni, Ekaterina Ilieva, Tanya Terzieva and Monika Ivanova. Guest performers included Veda junior, Servan and Elitsa, Sredets, Aktsent, Zhulieta Mihneva with "Bez radio ne moga", Doni and Neti with "Tozi film" and "Tseluni me", Levski The results were determined by public televoting. "Bonbolandiya" performed by Bon-Bon were the winners, receiving almost 25% of the public vote.

Final – 29 September 2007
R/O	Artist	Song	Songwriter(s)	Televote	Place
1	Hristina Sergieva	"Az tantsuvam" ("Аз танцувам")	Hristina Sergieva	7.49%	8
2	Divna Stancheva	"Zooparti" ("Зоопарти")	Divna Stancheva	8.45%	4
3	Siyana Todorova	"Vŭrni se" ("Върни се")	Siyana Todorova	3.75%	9
4	Emiliya Peykova and Triksi	"Rozovi ochila" ("Розови очила")	Aleks Ivanov; Hrista Georgieva	7.52%	7
5	Kaloyan Kalchev	"Bez teb" ("Без теб")	Kaloyan Kalchev	10.37%	3
6	Bon-Bon	"Bonbolandiya" ("Бонболандия")	Bon-Bon	24.99%	1
7	Kristina Tsanova	"Priyatelki" ("Приятелки")	Kristina Tsanova	3.24%	10
8	Simeon and Tatyana Zhelyazkovi	"Morski igri" ("Морски игри")	Simeon Zhelyazkov; Tatyana Zhelyazkova	8.35%	5
9	Peeshtite kengurcheta	"Tayna mechta" ("Тайна мечта")	Ana Mariya Delieva	18.06%	2
10	Di Stars	"Dali lyubov..." ("Дали любов...")	Rumyana Dineva; Veselina Ilieva	7.78%	6

== At Junior Eurovision ==
Bulgaria performed 8th in the running order, following Romania and preceding Serbia. Bulgaria placed 7th with 86 points, which was then the best record for Bulgaria in the contest, while Krisia broke the record with Hassan & Ibrahim in 2014, when they came second with 147 points, which is now Bulgaria's best result in the contest.

=== Voting ===
Points awarded to Bulgaria
Score	Country
12 points (Note: All countries received one set of 12 points to ensure no country finished with nul points.)	
10 points	
8 points	Romania
7 points	Belgium; Cyprus; Macedonia; Serbia
6 points	Armenia; Georgia
5 points	Greece; Netherlands
4 points	Malta
3 points	Russia; Sweden; Ukraine
2 points	Lithuania
1 point	Portugal

Points awarded by Bulgaria
Score	Country
12 points	Macedonia
10 points	Belarus
8 points	Armenia
7 points	Romania
6 points	Russia
5 points	Georgia
4 points	Serbia
3 points	Malta
2 points	Sweden
1 point	Netherlands
