= Sweden in the Junior Eurovision Song Contest 2007 =

- Junior Eurovision Song Contest 2007
- Country: Sweden
- Selection process: Stage Junior 2007
- Selection date: 31 August 2007

Competing entry
- Song: "Nu eller aldrig"
- Artist: Frida Sandén

Placement
- Final result: 8th, 83 points

Participation chronology

Sweden was represented at the Junior Eurovision Song Contest 2007, held in Rotterdam, the Netherlands, with their entry organised by broadcaster TV4. TV4 held a national final Stage Junior 2007 to select the Swedish entry for the contest, which was held on 31 August 2007.

== Before Junior Eurovision ==
=== Stage Junior 2007 ===
Stage Junior 2007, TV4's national selection for the Junior Eurovision Song Contest, was held at the Vasateatern in Stockholm on 31 August 2007, hosted by singer Agneta Sjödin and comedian Adam Alsing, the hosts of last year's contest. Eight songs competed to become the fifth Swedish entry to the Junior Eurovision Song Contest, with televoting and SMS voting deciding the final winner. Performances were made by last year's Swedish entry Molly Sandén and Carola, winner of the Eurovision Song Contest 1991. The final winner was Frida Sandén, sister of Molly Sandén, with the song "Nu eller aldrig", who beat 2 Times 2 by just 1% of the votes. Only the top three songs were announced, with Frida Sandén winning the contest as the favourite, receiving 16.5% of the votes for her performance of "Nu eller aldrig".

Final – 31 August 2007
Draw	Artist	Song	Televote	Place
1	Felicia Warvn	"Upp och ner"	—	—
2	Rufus Blad	"Superhjälte"	—	—
3	Frida Sandén	"Nu eller aldrig"	16.5%	1
4	Marcus Sjöstrand	"Utan dig"	—	—
5	2 Times 2	"Superstar"	15.5%	2
6	Vendela Palmgren	"En som dig"	—	3
7	Emmalisa Norrhamn	"Bara du kan"	—	—
8	Roshanak Hosseini	"Ta min hand"	—	—

== At Junior Eurovision ==
On the night of the contest, held in Rotterdam, the Netherlands, Frida Sandén performed 13th in the running order of the contest, following Ukraine and preceding Malta. At the close of the voting Frida received 83 points, placing 8th of the 17 competing entries.

=== Voting ===
Points awarded to Sweden
Score	Country
12 points (Note: All countries received one set of 12 points to ensure no country finished with nul points.)	
10 points	Netherlands
8 points	Belgium; Lithuania
7 points	
6 points	Macedonia; Romania; Serbia
5 points	Portugal
4 points	Belarus; Russia; Ukraine
3 points	Greece; Malta
2 points	Bulgaria; Georgia
1 point	

Points awarded by Sweden
Score	Country
12 points	Serbia
10 points	Armenia
8 points	Belarus
7 points	Macedonia
6 points	Netherlands
5 points	Georgia
4 points	Malta
3 points	Bulgaria
2 points	Russia
1 point	Romania
