= Junior Eurovision Song Contest 2007 =

International song competition for youth

- Make A Big Splash

Date and venue
- Final: 8 December 2007
- Venue: Ahoy Arena; Rotterdam, Netherlands

Organisation
- Organiser: European Broadcasting Union (EBU)
- Executive supervisor: Svante Stockselius

Production
- Host broadcaster: Algemene Vereniging Radio Omroep (AVRO)
- Director: Eduard Huis in 't Veld
- Executive producer: José van der Mark
- Presenters: Sipke Jan Bousema; Kim-Lian van der Meij

Participants
- Number of entries: 17
- Debuting countries: Armenia; Bulgaria; Georgia; Lithuania
- Non-returning countries: Croatia; Spain
- Participation map: Competing countries Countries that participated in the past but not in 2007

Vote
- Voting system: Each country awards 1–8, 10, and 12 points to their 10 favourite songs
- Winning song: Belarus "S druz'yami"

The Junior Eurovision Song Contest 2007 was the fifth edition of the Junior Eurovision Song Contest, held on 8 December 2007 at the Ahoy indoor sporting arena in Rotterdam, Netherlands, and presented by Sipke Jan Bousema and Kim-Lian van der Meij. It was organised by the European Broadcasting Union (EBU) and host broadcaster AVRO, which was chosen by the EBU over Croatia's Hrvatska radiotelevizija (HRT) and the Cyprus Broadcasting Corporation (CyBC). The host broadcaster was announced on 13 July 2006 and the host city was announced on 11 September 2006. The budget for the contest was stated to be more than €2,000,000. Profits made from the televoting were donated to UNICEF.

The winner was Belarus with the song "S druz'yami" by Alexey Zhigalkovich, by a single point over Armenia. This was Belarus' second win; they won for the first time in 2005.

== Location ==
Locations of the bidding countries. The eliminated countries are marked in red. The chosen host country is marked in blue.

=== Bidding phase and host selection ===
Three countries bid for the rights to host the fifth Junior Eurovision Song Contest: Hrvatska radiotelevizija (HRT) for Croatia; Cyprus Broadcasting Corporation (CyBC) for Cyprus; and Algemene Vereniging Radio Omroep (AVRO) for the Netherlands. AVRO were awarded the rights to host the contest in September 2006, with a budget of more than €2,000,000 being spent to stage the event.

== Participants ==
Cover art of the official album

Patricia Goldsmith, Communications Adviser of the Eurovision TV department, stated that nineteen countries would participate in the Junior Eurovision Song Contest 2007, though Spanish broadcaster Radiotelevisión Española (RTVE) later announced its withdrawal from the contest. Croatian broadcaster Hrvatska Radiotelevizija (HRT) also withdrew due to expense and difficulties in broadcasting the contest live.

Four countries, Armenia, Bulgaria, Georgia and Lithuania, debuted in the competition. Originally Bosnia and Herzegovina as well was going to be one of the four débutants but Georgia took its place when Radiotelevizija Bosne i Hercegovine (BHRT) decided to withdraw. The minimum age of contestants was raised from 8 to 10 years this year.

An official double CD of the Junior Eurovision Song Contest 2007 was intended to go on sale on 23 December 2007, however it was later cancelled due to a lack of interest.

Participants of the Junior Eurovision Song Contest 2007
Country	Broadcaster	Artist	Song	Language	Songwriter(s)
Armenia	AMPTV	Arevik	"Erazanq" (Երազանք)	Armenian	Mariana Javakhyan; Sargis Mzikyan
Belarus	BTRC	Alexey Zhigalkovich	"S druz'yami" (С друзьями)	Russian	Alexey Zhigalkovich
Belgium	VRT	Trust	"Anders"	Dutch	Mirek Coutigny; Laurens Platteeuw; Matthieu Renier; Eva Storme
Bulgaria	BNT	Bon-Bon	"Bonbolandiya" (Бонболандия)	Bulgarian	Bon-Bon
Cyprus	CyBC	Yiorgos Ioannides	"I mousiki dinei ftera" (Η μουσική δίνει φτερά)	Greek	Yiorgos Ioannides
Georgia	GPB	Mariam Romelashvili	"Odelia Ranuni" (ოდელია რანუნი)	Georgian	Mariam Romelashvili
Greece	ERT	Made in Greece	"Kapou berdeftika" (Καποu μπερδεύτηκα)	Greek	Anna Trepekli; Stefani Trepekli; Susan Trepekli
Lithuania	LRT	Lina Joy	"Kai miestas snaudžia"	Lithuanian	Lina Joy
Macedonia	MRT	Rosica Kulakova and Dimitar Stojmenovski	"Ding Ding Dong" (Динг Динг Донг)	Macedonian	Rosica Kulakova; Dimitar Stojmenovski
Malta	PBS	Cute	"Music"	English	Cute
Netherlands	AVRO	Lisa, Amy and Shelley	"Adem in, adem uit"	Dutch	Amy Vol; Lisa Vol; Shelley Vol
Portugal	RTP	Jorge Leiria	"Só quero é cantar"	Portuguese	Jorge Leiria
Romania	TVR	4Kids	"Sha-la-la"	Romanian	Mircea Eremia
Russia	VGTRK	Alexandra Golovchenko	"Otlichnitsa" (Отличница)	Russian	Alexandra Golovchenko
Serbia	RTS	Nevena Božović	"Piši mi" (Пиши ми)	Serbian	Nevena Božović
Sweden	TV4	Frida Sandén	"Nu eller aldrig"	Swedish	Frida Sandén
Ukraine	NTU	Ilona Halytska	"Urok hlamuru" (Урок гламуру)	Ukrainian	Ilona Halytska

=== Returning artists ===
Even though the rules of Junior Eurovision at the time did not allow participation of returning artists, Sweden's Frida Sandén previously provided backing vocals for her sister Molly Sandén in 2006.

== Format ==
=== Visual design ===
On 22 October 2007, the contest was officially presented to the media at a press conference where the first details regarding the show were confirmed. The theme for the contest was water and the motto was Make a big splash!. Five water curtains decorated the stage designed by Ronald van Bersselaar, which explained why this year’s logo featured the "singing girl" wearing boots.

=== Presenters ===
At the same press conference, Kim-Lian van der Meij was revealed to be the female host of the show, alongside Sipke Jan Bousema who was the previously announced as the male host.

== Contest overview ==
The event took place on 8 December 2007 at 20:15 CET. Seventeen countries participated, with the running order published in October 2007. All the countries competing were eligible to vote via televote. Belarus won with 137 points, with Armenia, Serbia, Georgia, and Macedonia, completing the top five. Lithuania, Cyprus, Belgium, Portugal, and Greece occupied the bottom five positions.

The show was opened by all participants alongside dancers from the Lucia Marthas Dance Academy performing the specially-commissioned UNICEF song "One World", written by Jeroen Rietbergen and Ronald Molendijk, on stage in the arena followed by the traditional flag parade introducing the 17 participating countries. The interval act included Dutch group Ch!pz and a performance by singer Katie Melua.

R/O	Country	Artist	Song	Points	Place
1	Georgia	Mariam Romelashvili	"Odelia Ranuni"	116	4
2	Belgium	Trust	"Anders"	19	15
3	Armenia	Arevik	"Erazanq"	136	2
4	Cyprus	Yiorgos Ioannides	"I mousiki dinei ftera"	29	14
5	Portugal	Jorge Leiria	"Só quero é cantar"	15	16
6	Russia	Alexandra Golovchenko	"Otlichnitsa"	105	6
7	Romania	4Kids	"Sha-la-la"	54	10
8	Bulgaria	Bon-Bon	"Bonbolandiya"	86	7
9	Serbia	Nevena Božović	"Piši mi"	120	3
10	Netherlands	Lisa, Amy and Shelley	"Adem in, adem uit"	39	11
11	Macedonia	Rosica Kulakova and Dimitar Stojmenovski	"Ding Ding Dong"	111	5
12	Ukraine	Ilona Halytska	"Urok hlamuru"	56	9
13	Sweden	Frida Sandén	"Nu eller aldrig"	83	8
14	Malta	Cute	"Music"	37	12
15	Greece	Made in Greece	"Kapou berdeftika"	14	17
16	Lithuania	Lina Joy	"Kai miestas snaudžia"	33	13
17	Belarus	Alexey Zhigalkovich	"S druz'yami"	137	1

=== Spokespersons ===
Viewers from each participating country voted by telephone and SMS. Each country's awards points to their top-10 favourites based on these public voting results. The following spokespersons announced the point 1 to 8, 10, and the maximum 12 points.

- Georgia – Nino Epremidze
- Belgium – Bab Buelens
- Armenia – Ani Sahakyan
- Cyprus – Natalie Michael
- Portugal – Clara Pedro
- Russia – Marina Knyazeva
- Romania – Iulia Ciobanu
- Bulgaria – Lyubomir Hadjiyski
- Serbia – Anđelija Erić
- Netherlands – Kimberly Nieuwenhuizen
- Macedonia – Mila Zafirović
- Ukraine – Assol
- Sweden – Molly Sandén
- Malta – Sophie DeBattista
- Greece – Chloe Sofia Boleti
- Lithuania – Indre Grikstelyte
- Belarus – Alexander Rogachevskiy

== Detailed voting results ==
Detailed voting results
		Total score	Georgia	Belgium	Armenia	Cyprus	Portugal	Russia	Romania	Bulgaria	Serbia	Netherlands	Macedonia	Ukraine	Sweden	Malta	Greece	Lithuania	Belarus
Contestants	Georgia	116		4	12	10	4	8	4	5		6	5	8	5	10	8	10	5
Contestants	Belgium	19										7							
Contestants	Armenia	136	12	12		12		12	12	8	5	12		12	10		10		7
Contestants	Cyprus	29			5												12		
Contestants	Portugal	15			2	1													
Contestants	Russia	105	1	2	10	5	6		3	6	10	3	10	7	2	8	4	4	12
Contestants	Romania	54				8	8	1		7	4		3		1	5	2	1	2
Contestants	Bulgaria	86	6	7	6	7	1	3	8		7	5	7	3	3	4	5	2	
Contestants	Serbia	120	7	6	4	6	7	7	5	4		8	12	6	12	6	6	6	6
Contestants	Netherlands	39	3	10	1	4				1					6	2			
Contestants	Macedonia	111	5	3	7	3	10	5	10	12	12			5	7	7		5	8
Contestants	Ukraine	56	10		3		3	6	1		1		1			1	1	7	10
Contestants	Sweden	83	2	8			5	4	6	2	6	10	6	4		3	3	8	4
Contestants	Malta	37					2		2	3	2	1	4	1	4			3	3
Contestants	Greece	14				2													
Contestants	Lithuania	33	8	1				2			3	2	2	2					1
Contestants	Belarus	137	4	5	8		12	10	7	10	8	4	8	10	8	12	7	12	

=== 12 points ===
Below is a summary of all 12 points received. All countries were given 12 points at the start of voting to ensure that no country finished with nul points.

N.	Contestant	Nation(s) giving 12 points
7	Armenia	Belgium, Cyprus, Georgia, Netherlands, Romania, Russia, Ukraine
3	Belarus	Lithuania, Malta, Portugal
2	Serbia	Macedonia, Sweden
2	Macedonia	Bulgaria, Serbia
1	Cyprus	Greece
1	Georgia	Armenia
1	Russia	Belarus

== Broadcasts ==
Most countries sent commentators to Rotterdam or commentated from their own country, in order to add insight to the participants and, if necessary, provide voting information. A live webcast was also streamed via the Junior Eurovision official website.

Broadcasters and commentators in participating countries
Country	Broadcaster(s)	Channel(s)	Commentator(s)	Ref.
Armenia	ARMTV	Armenia 1	Gohar Gasparyan and Felix Khachatryan	
Belarus	BTRC	Belarus-1, Belarus 24	Denis Kurian	
Belgium	VRT	Één	Kristien Maes and Ben Roelants	
Bulgaria	BNT	Channel 1	Elena Rosberg and Georgi Kushvaliev	
Cyprus	CyBC	RIK1	Kyriakos Pastides	
Georgia	GPB	1TV	Temo Kvirkvelia	
Greece	ERT	ET1	Marion Mihelidaki	
Lithuania	LRT	LTV 1	Darius Užkuraitis	
Macedonia	MKRTV	MTV 1	Milanka Rašik	
Malta	PBS	TVM	Valerie Vella	
Netherlands	AVRO	Nederland 1	Marcel Kuijer	
Portugal	RTP	RTP1	Isabel Angelino	
Romania	TVR	TVR1	Ioana Isopakos and Alexandru Nagy	
Russia	RTR	Russia-1	Olga Shelest	
Serbia	RTS	RTS2, RTS Sat	Duška Vučinić-Lučić	
Sweden	TV4		Adam Alsing	
Ukraine	NTU	Pershyj	Timur Miroshnychenko	

Broadcasters and commentators in non-participating countries
Country	Broadcaster(s)	Channel(s)	Commentator(s)	Ref.
Australia	SBS (Note: Although Australia is not itself eligible to enter, it broadcast the event on the Special Broadcasting Service (SBS). As is the case each year, it did not however broadcast it live due to the difference in Australian time zones. It was screened at the later date of 24 December 2007 at 16.30 (local time), and repeated a few weeks after. Since this period is non-rated for television stations, how many people watched the broadcast is unknown.)	SBS TV	No commentary	
Azerbaijan	İTV		Unknown	
Bosnia and Herzegovina	BHRT	BHT	Dejan Kukrić	
Israel	IBA (Note: The contest was broadcast in Israel where it was watched by 400,000 viewers.)	C1	No commentary	

== See also ==
- Eurovision Song Contest 2007
- Eurovision Dance Contest 2007
