= Russia in the Junior Eurovision Song Contest 2007 =

- Junior Eurovision Song Contest 2007
- Country: Russia
- Selection process: National Final
- Selection date: 3 June 2007

Competing entry
- Song: "Otlichnitsa"
- Artist: Alexandra Golovchenko

Placement
- Final result: 6th, 105 points

Participation chronology

Russia was represented at the Junior Eurovision Song Contest 2007 in Rotterdam, Netherlands. The Russian entry was selected through a national final, organised by Russian broadcaster All-Russia State Television and Radio Company (VGTRK). The final was held on 3 June 2007. Alexandra Golovchenko and her song 'Otlichnitsa' won the national final.

== Before Junior Eurovision ==
=== National Final ===
On 7 April 2007, VGTRK announced that a national final would be held to select Russia' entry for the Junior Eurovision Song Contest 2007. A submission period for interested artists was opened and lasted until 8 May 2007. A professional jury selected twenty artists and songs from the applicants to proceed to the televised national final.

The selected artists and songs competed at the national final which took place on 3 June 2007 at the "Rossiya" concert hall in Moscow, hosted by Oksana Fedorova. The winner was determined exclusively by public televoting. The members of the backup jury were Nadezhda Babkina, Philipp Kirkorov, Grigory Gladkov, Yevgeny Krylatov and Larisa Rubalskaya.

In addition to the performances from the competitors, the show featured guest performances by Tolmachevy Sisters.

Final – 3 June 2007
Draw	Artist	Song	Place
1	Band "Syurpiz"	"Brodyaga-saksofon"	16
2	Ekaterina Pochekaeva	"Zvezda dlya mamy"	6
3	Duet "Kolombina"	"Sto luchshih snov"	11
4	Maria Paschenko	"Mechty"	12
5	Artyom Kuznetsov	"Voyage"	20
6	Yuliana Savilova	"Igra v orkestr"	7
7	Alexandra Golovchenko	"Otlichnitsa"	1
8	Kamila Izmaylova	"Leto"	9
9	Lena Bashlykova	"Druzya"	19
10	Erika Atoyan	"Muzyka-igray"	17
11	Zhenya Morozova	"Rodina moya"	4
12	Nikita Ivanov	"Uletayu v nebo"	3
13	Natalya Polyakova	"Banany"	5
14	Band "Domisolki"	"Solnechny dozhdik"	13
15	Yulia Usova	"Angel"	8
16	Maria Pestunova	"Ryzhiy malchishka"	18
17	Nastya Kolesnikova	"Hararum parum"	15
18	Vladimir Safonkin	"Pesnya moya"	14
19	Oleg Sidorov	"Pesnya moya"	2
20	Quintet "Verba"	"Leti, leto"	10

== At Junior Eurovision ==
During the allocation draw on 29 October 2007, Russia was drawn to perform 6th, following Portugal and preceding Romania. Russia placed 6th, scoring 106 points.

Alexandra Golovchenko was joined on stage by four boys: Roman, Dmitry, Lev and future Olympic gymnast Artur Dalaloyan.

In Russia, show were broadcast on Russia-1 with commentary by Olga Shelest. The Russian spokesperson revealing the result of the Russian vote was Marina Knyazeva.

=== Voting ===
Points awarded to Russia
Score	Country
12 points (Note: All countries received one set of 12 points to ensure no country finished with nul points.)	Belarus
10 points	Armenia; Macedonia; Serbia
8 points	Malta
7 points	Ukraine
6 points	Portugal; Bulgaria
5 points	Cyprus
4 points	Greece; Lithuania
3 points	Romania; Netherlands
2 points	Belgium; Sweden
1 point	Georgia

Points awarded by Russia
Score	Country
12 points	Armenia
10 points	Belarus
8 points	Georgia
7 points	Serbia
6 points	Ukraine
5 points	Macedonia
4 points	Sweden
3 points	Bulgaria
2 points	Lithuania
1 point	Romania
