= Mirna Radulović =

Serbian singer-songwriter (born 1992)

Mirna Radulović Мирна Радуловић
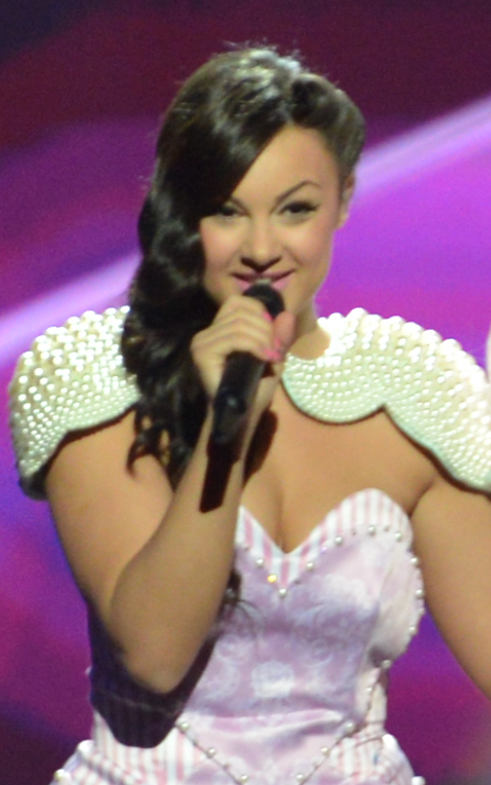
- Mirna Radulovic at Eurovision Song Contest 2013 with Moje 3

Background information
- Born: Mirna Radulović; 5 July 1992 (age 34); Subotica, Yugoslavia
- Genres: Pop, dance-pop, R&B
- Occupation: Singer-songwriter
- Instruments: Guitar, piano, violin
- Years active: 2012–present
- Labels: Prva Records, PGP RTS
- Formerly of: Moje 3

Mirna Radulović (Serbian Cyrillic: Мирна Радуловић, born 5 July 1992) is a Serbian singer and songwriter. She rose to national media prominence as the winner of the second season of Prvi glas Srbije. Radulović represented Serbia in the Eurovision Song Contest 2013 with the song, "Ljubav je svuda", as a part of the girl group Moje 3.

== Life and career ==
=== Early life and career: 1992–2012 ===
Radulović was born on 5 July 1992 in Subotica (then Federal Republic of Yugoslavia, now Serbia). Her mother is an actress and ballerina at the Theatre of Subotica. Radulović has a twin sister with whom she used to perform as a duo. Prior to her participation in Prvi glas Srbije, Radulović performed in several clubs in Subotica. She cited and Beyoncé and Christina Aguilera as her strongest musical influences.

Radulović has previously auditioned for the first season of Prvi glas Srbije in 2011; though she passed the first audition, she quit the competition as she had fainted after her first performance in front of the judges.

=== Prvi glas Srbije: 2012–13 ===
Radulović became a household name in Serbia as the contestant and the winner of the second season of Prvi glas Srbije. She successfully went through the blind audition and the battle phase to progress to the live performances. In the battle phase, Radulović and Nevena Božović both impressed the judges Vlado Georgiev, Aleksandra Radović and Saša Milošević Mare that they decided to put them both through. Ironically, Radulović and Božović would eventually both reach the grand final of the competition. Radulović was nominated for elimination once, in the 18th episode on 22 December 2012, but was saved by the judges.

During her run on Prvi glas Srbije, Radulović was known for her flawless performances of all genres and her triumph was deemed as well deserved. However, viewers of the show criticized the concept where the judges decided the winner instead of the audience, while others expressed their beliefs that Nevena Božović would have won if the decision had been on the voters.

Radulović performed the following songs live:

- Christina Aguilera — "Hurt"
- Aretha Franklin — "Think"
- Zorica Brunclik — "A tebe nema"
- Lepa Brena — "Janoš"
- Alexandra Burke — "Hallelujah"
- Beyoncé Knowles — "Naughty Girl"
- Aleksandra Radović – "Karta za jug"/Bisera Veletanlić — "Zlatni dan"
- Adele — "Skyfall"/Silvana Armenulić — "Noćas mi srce pati"
- Jelena Tomašević — "Oro" / Rihanna — "Where Have You Been"
- Christina Aguilera — "Your Body"/Silvana Armenulić — "Ciganine, sviraj, sviraj"
- Karolina Gočeva — "Više se ne vraćaš" / Alicia Keys — "Girl on Fire" / Tina Turner — "The Best" / Mariah Carey — "Hero"

=== 2013–present: Eurovision Song Contest 2013 and then-upcoming debut album ===
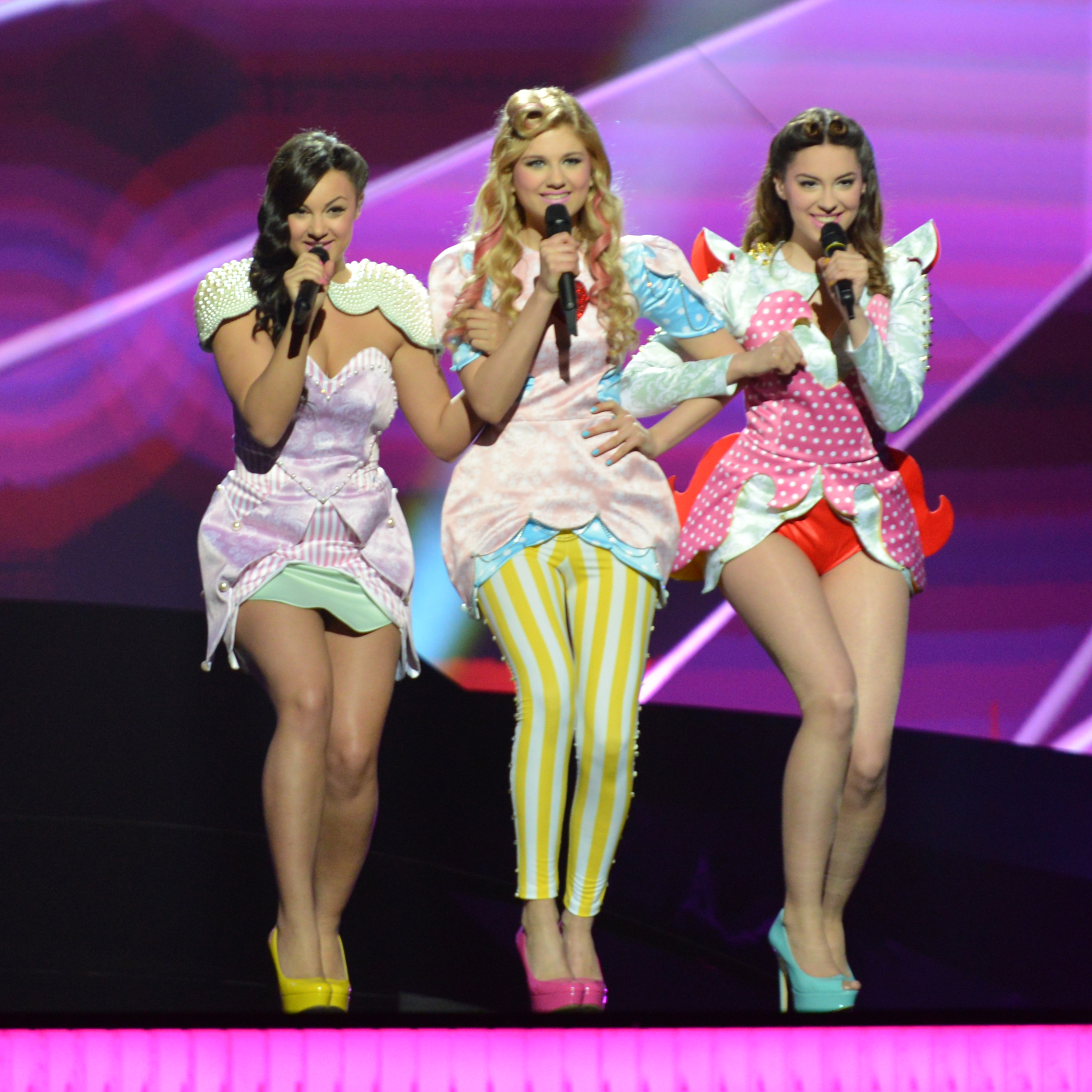
Mirna performing (as part of Moje 3) at the first dress rehearsal of the 2013 Eurovision Song Contest.

As the reward for her triumph in Prvi glas Srbije, Radulović earned a recording contract with Prva Records and €100,000 that would be invested in her debut album and its promotion.

On 31 January 2013, Radulović and her Prvi glas Srbije colleagues Nevena Božović and Sara Jo participated in charity cooking at the Drinka Pavlović Orphanage in Belgrade. The following day, Radulović and other finalists of the second season of Prvi glas Srbije held a concert in Podgorica, Montenegro, in front of several thousand people. Radulović herself performed solo in Subotica for the Valentine's Day on 14 February 2013.

In February 2013, it was announced that Radulović, Božović and Jovanović would take part in Beosong 2013, Serbian national election for the Eurovision Song Contest 2013, under the name of Moje 3 with the song "Ljubav je svuda" (lit. 'Love Is Everywhere'). Their song was written by Saša Milošević, who was part of the songwriting duo that wrote "Molitva", the winning song of the Eurovision Song Contest 2007. Radulović, Božović and Jovanović explained that they would not be forming a band and that they would perform as a trio only for Beosong. Eventually, Moje 3 was convinced to win the national final, held on 3 March 2013, with more than 25.000 votes. It was subsequently announced that Moje 3 would perform the last in the first semi-final event, which would be held on 14 May 2013 at Malmö Arena.

It has been announced that Moje 3 would release promotional versions of "Ljubav je svuda" in other languages, and that they would perform at the Eurovision In Concert in Amsterdam on 13 April 2013.

After the disbandment of Moje 3, it was announced that Radulović would release her debut album later in 2013.

== Personal life ==
Shortly after Prvi glas Srbije ended, the rumours that Radulović's boyfriend cheated on her while she was on the show began circulating the press; Radulović subsequently stated that she had broken up with her boyfriend, but that he had not cheated on her. More recently, it has been rumoured that Radulović was dating her Prvi glas Srbije colleague Zoran Stanić.

Media also speculated about the allegedly strained relationship between Radulović and Nevena Božović, but Radulović denied those rumours.

== Discography ==
Title	Year	Album
"Ljubav je svuda" (as part of Moje 3)	2013	Ljubav je svuda
"Slušaj Dobro"	2013	N/A
"Pred Svima"	2014	N/A

== See also ==
- Moje 3
- Prvi glas Srbije
- Serbia in the Eurovision Song Contest 2013

Awards and achievements
Preceded by Davor Jovanović	Prvi glas Srbije winner 2013	Succeeded by Incumbent
Preceded by Željko Joksimović with Nije ljubav stvar	Serbia in the Eurovision Song Contest (as part of Moje 3); 2013	Succeeded by Bojana Stamenov with Beauty Never Lies
