= Aleksandra Radović =

Serbian singer-songwriter (born 1974)

- Born: 10 September 1974 (age 52); Bogatić, SR Serbia, SFR Yugoslavia
- Genres: Pop; adult contemporary
- Occupations: Singer; songwriter; vocal coach; television judge
- Instrument: Vocals
- Years active: 2001–present
- Labels: City Records; Croatia Records; PGP-RTS

Aleksandra Radović (Serbian Cyrillic: Александра Радовић, born 10 September 1974) is a Serbian singer-songwriter from Bogatić. She made her recording debut in 2003 and has since collectively released five studio albums. Radović has won numerous regional industry awards for pop music.

In addition to her recording career, she served as a judge on the singing competitions, such as Prvi glas Srbije (2012) and Pinkove Zvezde (2016).

== Early life ==
Radović was born on 10 September 1974 in Bogatić near Šabac. After graduating from the Music High School "Mihajlo Vukdragović" in Šabac, she attended the Academy of Arts in Novi Sad, from which she got a degree in music pedagogy.

Initially in the 90s, Radović was recording jingles and opening credits for the newly founded television network Pink. She also performed background recording vocals to singers like Lepa Brena, Ceca and Jelena Karleuša.

== Career ==
In 2003, Radović rose to prominence by participating on the Sunčane skale music festival in Herceg Novi with the song "Kao so u moru", placing 2nd. Her self-titled debut album was released later that year under City Records. In 2005, she competed on the music festival in Budva with "Karte za jug", again finishing as the runner-up. Following the release of her second album, Domino, in July 2006, Radović embarked on a regional tour and held her first solo concert in Sava Centar in November 2007. Her third album, Žar ptica, was released in July 2009. Žar ptica saw commercial success, becoming the second best-selling album in Serbia. It was promoted with a tour across Serbia and North Macedonia. In December, Radović became the first female artist to sell out two consecutive concerts in Sava Centar. In February the following year, she won the Female Pop Singer of the Year Award at the annual Oskari popularnosti. In June 2010, Žar ptica also won the Index 2010 Award for the best regional album of the year.

In June 2012, Radović alongside singer Vlado Georgiev and songwriter Saša Milošević Mare was announced as the judge and mentor on the second season of the singing competition show Prvi glas Srbije. All three grand finalists of the season: Mirna Radulović, Nevena Božović and Sara Jovanović, were under her mentorship. In December 2016, Radović released Carstvo. Same year, she also served as a judge on the third season of Pinkove Zvezde along with Šaban Šaulić, Zorica Brunclik and Dara Bubamara. She left the show mid-season, after Dara had been replaced with Maja Nikolić. In November 2018, Radović again performed to a sold-out Sava Centar. In January 2019, she won the Female Pop Song of the Year Award for "Ljubavi moja" at the Music Awards Ceremony, held in the Belgrade Arena.

On Valentine's Day 2020, Radović released her fifth studio album, Predvorje života, under PGP-RTS and Croatia Records.

== Personal life ==
Radović was married to fellow-musician Dejan Nikolić. In June 2010, she gave birth to daughter Nina, while dating businessman Aleksandar Zeremski.

Radović founded her own children's singing school. Singer Milica Pavlović was one of her famous pupils.

In November 2011, she organized a benefit concert alongside regional female pop singers Nina Badrić, Karolina Gočeva and Maya Sar at the Vatroslav Lisinski Concert Hall, Zagreb to raise awareness about breast cancer. All the proceeds were donated to a charity group. In March 2013, Radović also held a charity concert in Sava Centar to raise funds for an eight-year-old girl in need of a heart transplant.

== Discography ==
Studio albums

- Aleksandra Radović (2003)
- Dommino (2006)
- Žar ptica (2009)
- Carstvo (2016)
- Predvorje života (2020)

== Filmography ==
Filmography of Aleksandra Radović
Year	Title	Genre	Role	Notes
2011	Alvin and the Chipmunks: Chipwrecked	Film	Flight Attendant	Serbian synchronization
2012-2013	Prvi glas Srbije	Television	Herself	Season 2; judge and mentor
2013	Pevaj brate	Television	Herself	Cameo appearance
2013	Epic	Film	Queen Tara	Serbian synchronization
2016	Pinkove Zvezde	Television	Herself	Season 3; judge
2017	Tvoje lice zvuči poznato	Television	Herself	Season 4; judge
