= Slušaj Dobro =

"Slušaj dobro"

Single by Mirna Radulović
- Released: December 28, 2013
- Recorded: 2013
- Genre: Teen pop, dance-pop
- Length: 3:22
- Label: PRVA Records
- Songwriter: Saša Milošević Mare
- Producer: Saša Milošević Mare

Mirna Radulović singles chronology
"Ljubav je svuda" (2013)	"Slušaj dobro" (2013)	"Pred Svima" (2014)

"Slušaj dobro" (stylized as "Slušaj dobro!") is the debut single by Serbian singer Mirna Radulović. It was first performed on the December 28, 2013 in the final week of the TLZP season one. Saša Milošević Mare wrote the lyrics, and was also the composer of the song.

After winning the second season of Prvi glas Srbije, she got new album as the prize. This was the first song released.
