= Netherlands in the Junior Eurovision Song Contest 2007 =

2007 Junior Eurovision participation

- Junior Eurovision Song Contest 2007
- Participating broadcaster: Algemene Vereniging Radio Omroep (AVRO)
- Country: Netherlands
- Selection process: Junior Songfestival 2007
- Selection date: 6 October 2007

Competing entry
- Song: "Adem in, adem uit"
- Artist: Lisa, Amy & Shelley
- Songwriters: Amy Vol; Lisa Vol; Shelley Vol

Placement
- Final result: 11th, 39 points

Participation chronology

The Netherlands was represented at the Junior Eurovision Song Contest 2007 with the song "Adem in, adem uit", written by Amy Vol, Lisa Vol, and Shelley Vol, and performed by themselves as Lisa, Amy & Shelley. The Dutch participating broadcaster, Algemene Vereniging Radio Omroep (AVRO), selected its entry for the contsest through Junior Songfestival 2007, a national final consisting of 10 songs spread out into two semi-finals and a final. In addition, AVRO was also the host broadcaster and staged the event at the Ahoy Arena in Rotterdam.

== Before Junior Eurovision ==
=== Junior Songfestival 2007 ===
The final consisted of two semi-finals and one final. Each semi-final had 5 songs, with 2 advancing to the final. A wildcard was given to one song, which was then allowed to go to the final.

The votes were awarded as follows:

- Kids jury - A jury of children aged under 16 years
- Jury - A jury consisting of Gordon Heuckeroth, Yes-R and Nikkie Plessen.
- Televoting

==== Semi-final 1 ====
Semi-final 1 – 22 September 2007
| R/O | Artist | Song | Kids Jury | Expert Jury | Televote | Total | Place |
|---|---|---|---|---|---|---|---|
| 1 | Démira | "Ik wil rocken" | 8 | 8 | 8 | 24 | 4 |
| 2 | Nigel & Renaldo | "Tril met die bil" | 10 | 10 | 9 | 29 | 2 |
| 3 | Tess | "Geef elkaar een hand" | 9 | 9 | 10 | 28 | 3 |
| 4 | Jelle | "Ik ben verliefd" | 7 | 7 | 7 | 21 | 5 |
| 5 | Lisa, Amy & Shelley | "Adem in, adem uit" | 12 | 12 | 12 | 36 | 1 |

==== Semi-final 2 ====
Semi-final 2 – 29 September 2007
| R/O | Artist | Song | Kids Jury | Expert Jury | Televote | Total | Place |
|---|---|---|---|---|---|---|---|
| 1 | Gaia | "Zingen is leven" | 9 | 10 | 7 | 26 | 3 |
| 2 | Serge & Dion | "Jij hoort bij ons" | 7 | 7 | 10 | 24 | 4 |
| 3 | Cher, Stephanie & Jewel | "Switch" | 8 | 8 | 8 | 24 | 5 |
| 4 | Famke | "Als je iets wilt" | 12 | 9 | 9 | 30 | 2 |
| 5 | Zanna | "Zeg me wereld" | 10 | 12 | 12 | 34 | 1 |

==== Final ====
Final – 6 October 2007
| R/O | Artist | Song | Kids Jury | Expert Jury | Televote | Total | Place |
|---|---|---|---|---|---|---|---|
| 1 | Nigel & Renaldo | "Tril met die bil" | 9 | 9 | 8 | 26 | 3 |
| 2 | Lisa, Amy & Shelley | "Adem in, adem uit" | 12 | 12 | 12 | 36 | 1 |
| 3 | Serge & Dion | "Jij hoort bij ons" | 7 | 7 | 9 | 23 | 4 |
| 4 | Famke | "Als je iets wilt" | 8 | 8 | 7 | 23 | 5 |
| 5 | Zanna | "Zeg me, wereld" | 10 | 10 | 10 | 30 | 2 |

== At Junior Eurovision ==
Lisa, Amy & Shelley performed 10th on the night of the contest, held in the Dutch city of Rotterdam. They received 39 points, placing 11th of the 17 competing countries.

=== Voting ===
Points awarded to the Netherlands
| Score | Country |
|---|---|
| 12 points (Note: All countries received one set of 12 points to ensure no country finished with nul points.) | |
| 10 points | Belgium |
| 8 points | |
| 7 points | |
| 6 points | Sweden |
| 5 points | |
| 4 points | Cyprus |
| 3 points | Georgia |
| 2 points | Malta |
| 1 point | Armenia; Bulgaria |

Points awarded by the Netherlands
| Score | Country |
|---|---|
| 12 points | Armenia |
| 10 points | Sweden |
| 8 points | Serbia |
| 7 points | Belgium |
| 6 points | Georgia |
| 5 points | Bulgaria |
| 4 points | Belarus |
| 3 points | Russia |
| 2 points | Lithuania |
| 1 point | Malta |
