= Dommino =

Studio album by Aleksandra Radović
- Released: 25 July 2006
- Recorded: 2004–2006
- Genres: Pop, R&B
- Length: 49:37
- Label: City Records

Aleksandra Radović chronology
Aleksandra Radović (2003)	Dommino (2006)	Žar ptica (2009)

Singles from Dommino
- 1. "Nisi moj" Released: March 2006; 2. "Zagrli me" Released: October 2006

Dommino is the second studio album by Aleksandra Radović released on July 25, 2006, and it gained great popularity in Serbia, Montenegro and Bosnia and Herzegovina. She worked on album with famous Yugoslavian songwriters, Aleksandra Milutinović, Nikša Bratoš, Darko Dimitrov. Goran Kovačić worked on the album too, and he wrote one of the best ballads "Čuvam te". Dommino become bestselling album for October, as of IPS Top 10.

== Singles and promotion ==
The album lead single "Nisi moj", which was written by Aleksandra Milutinović and Darko Dimitrov was released in first quarter of the year. The song soon reached top places in most radio and TV playlists in Serbia, Montenegro and Bosnia. Album second single called "Zagrli me", released in September 2006, was written by Aleksandra Milutinović and produced by Darko Dimitrov. The second single become also very popular and scored top places on playlists.

== Tour and concerts ==
In autumn of 2007 she released single "Sviraj", which announced her first concert in Sava Centar in Belgrade, which was held on November 11, 2007. At concert she performed songs from her to albums, Aleksandra Radović and Dommino. Guest stars on the concert were Jelena Tomašević and Sergej Ćetković. After concert in Belgrade she visited other big cities in Serbia. A year later she went on mini-tour through Bosnia visiting Banja Luka, Sarajevo and Tuzla. The tour was called "Aleksandra Radović on Stage".

== Track listing ==
1. "Intro"
2. "Zagrli me"
3. "Jesam te pustila"
4. "Ne verujem da me ne voliš"
5. "Možda je bolje bez mene"
6. "Čuvam te"
7. "Novi dan"
8. "Nema ljubavi tu"
9. "Nisi moj"
10. "Srce na dlan"
11. "Zažmuri"
12. "Neću plakati"
13. "Karta za jug" (bonus track)
