= Cute (Maltese band) =

Maltese girl group

- Origin: Malta
- Years active: 2007–present
- Members: Salaia Gerada; Trisha Smith; Paulanne Farrugia; Celaine Borg; Marzia Farrugia

Cute is a Maltese girl group consisting of Salaia Gerada, Trisha Smith, Paulanne Farrugia, Celaine Borg, and Marzia Farrugia. The group participated for Malta in the Junior Eurovision Song Contest 2007, in Rotterdam, Netherlands with their song "Music". They performed fourteenth in the contest, preceding Greece, and succeeding Sweden. They finished in 12th place scoring 37 points overall.

While in Rotterdam, the band sometimes wore matching outfits. They travelled to the contest with their manager Alison Ellul, sound engineer Elton Zarb and hairstylists Cut Coiffeur.

== Band members ==
Cute comprises five teenage female vocalists, who have all attended the Annalise School of Dancing, in Malta; where they learnt choreography. The group are also members of the Angelic Voices Choir.

- Salaia Gerada
- Trisha Smith
- Celaine Borg
- Marzia Farrugia
- Paulanne Farrugia

Between July 25th and 28th, 2006, band member Marzia Farrugia participated in the third edition of the Golden Cross International Singing Festival which is held annually in Malta. Marzia won the Best Choreography award with the song "Stejjer".

== Junior Eurovision Song Contest ==
On 7 September 2007, Cute won the Maltese national final with a total of 82 points and represented Malta in the Junior Eurovision Song Contest 2007. The national final was held in the Sir Temi Zammit Hall of the University of Malta, Tal-Qroqq.

== Discography ==
=== Singles ===
- 2007: "Hey You!"
- 2007: "Music"

== See also ==
- Malta in the Junior Eurovision Song Contest
- Junior Eurovision Song Contest 2007

Awards and achievements
Preceded by Sophie Debattista with "Extra Cute"	Malta in the Junior Eurovision Song Contest; 2007	Succeeded by Daniel Testa with "Junior Swing"
