= Lithuania in the Junior Eurovision Song Contest 2007 =

- Junior Eurovision Song Contest 2007
- Participating broadcaster: Lithuanian National Radio and Television (LRT)
- Country: Lithuania
- Selection process: Vaikų Eurovizija 2007
- Selection date: 21 October 2007

Competing entry
- Song: "Kai miestas snaudžia"
- Artist: Lina Joy
- Songwriter: Lina Joy

Placement
- Final result: 13th, 33 points

Participation chronology

Lithuania was represented at the Junior Eurovision Song Contest 2007 with the song "Kai miestas snaudžia", written and performed by Lina Joy. The Lithuanian participating broadcaster, Lithuanian National Radio and Television (LRT), organised the national final Vaikų Eurovizija 2007 to select its entry for the contest. This was the first-ever entry from Lithuania in the Junior Eurovision Song Contest.

== Before Junior Eurovision ==
=== Vaikų Eurovizija 2007 ===
The national selection show Vaikų Eurovizija 2007 consisted of six semi-finals held between 9 September and 14 October 2007 and a final held on 21 October 2007.

The submission window for the national final was opened by Lithuanian National Radio and Television (LRT) on 1 July 2007 and was closed on 20 August 2007.

In the semi-finals, two entries qualified to the final. The entry that received the most points from a three-member jury panel qualified for the final. An additional qualifier was selected from the remaining four entries by televoting. LRT also reserved the right to select a wildcard act for the final out of the remaining non-qualifying acts from the semi-finals. In the final, the winner was determined by a 50/50 combination of votes from a five-member jury panel and public televoting.

All of the shows were held by Irūna Puzaraitė and Juozas Liesis and broadcast on LTV. The semi-finals were held at 10:00 CEST.

==== Semi-final 1 ====
The first semi-final was held on 9 September 2007. Two entries qualified to the final. The entry that received the most points from a three-member jury panel qualified for the final. An additional qualifier was selected from the remaining four entries by televoting. The members of the jury consisted of Aistė Smilgevičiūtė, Linas Adomaitis and Laurynas Šarkinas.

Jury qualifier Public vote qualifier

R/O	Artist	Song	Jury		Public		Result
R/O	Artist	Song	Votes	Place	Televote	Place	Result
1	Monika Linkytė	"Vaikystės pasaka"	36	1	189	2	Advanced
2	Audrius Petrauskas	"O jeigu..."	19	5	81	5	Eliminated
3	Greta Razmislavičiūtė	"Nykštukai"	25	3	319	1	Advanced
4	Dominykas Kovalionas	"Noriu..."	23	4	114	4	Eliminated
5	Vaiva Virkutytė	"Žvaigždė"	26	2	127	3	Eliminated

Detailed Jury Votes
R/O	Song	A. Smilgevičiūtė	L. Adomaitis	L. Šarkinas	Total
1	"Vaikystės pasaka"	12	12	12	36
2	"O jeigu..."	6	7	6	19
3	"Nykštukai"	7	10	8	25
4	"Noriu..."	8	8	7	23
5	"Žvaigždė"	10	6	10	26

==== Semi-final 2 ====
The second semi-final was held on 16 September 2007. Two entries were to qualify to the final. However, as both the jury and televoting had the same winner, only Evelina Bučinskaitė & Tiks qualified for the final. The members of the jury consisted of Julija Ritčik, Viktoras Diawara and Rūta Ščiogolevaitė.

R/O	Artist	Song	Jury		Public		Result
R/O	Artist	Song	Votes	Place	Televote	Place	Result
1	Karolina Žibkutė	"Mamytės šventė"	25	3	268	2	Eliminated
2	Justas Jonauskas	"Čia Kastytis nebūsiu"	22	4	99	5	Eliminated
3	Evelina Bučinskaitė	"Čia ir dabar"	32	1	273	1	Advanced
4	Dalius Garnys	"Senelio bliuzas"	22	4	103	4	Eliminated
5	Ieva Ščerbinskaitė	"Pašokim"	28	2	159	3	Eliminated

Detailed Jury Votes
R/O	Song	J. Ritčik	V. Diawara	R. Ščiogolevaitė	Total
1	"Mamytės šventė"	8	7	10	25
2	"Čia Kastytis nebūsiu"	10	6	6	22
3	"Čia ir dabar"	12	12	8	32
4	"Senelio bliuzas"	7	8	7	22
5	"Pašokim"	6	10	12	28

==== Semi-final 3 ====
The third semi-final was held on 23 September 2007. Two entries qualified to the final. The entry that received the most points from a three-member jury panel qualified for the final. An additional qualifier was selected from the remaining four entries by televoting. The members of the jury consisted of Arnoldas Lukošius, Saulius Urbonavičius and Aistė Pilvelytė.

R/O	Artist	Song	Jury		Public		Result
R/O	Artist	Song	Votes	Place	Televote	Place	Result
1	Eglė Petrikaitė	"Kitokia svajonė"	24	3	232	2	Eliminated
2	Dovaldė Ulčinaitė	"Vaivorykštė"	18	5	141	3	Eliminated
3	Trio GIG	"Draugystės daina"	28	2	308	1	Advanced
4	Milda Rasilavičiūtė	"Neklaužada"	23	4	110	4	Eliminated
5	Monika Valiuškytė	"Aš noriu šokti"	36	1	108	5	Advanced

Detailed Jury Votes
R/O	Song	A. Lukošius	S. Urbonavičius	A. Pilvelytė	Total
1	"Kitokia svajonė"	7	10	7	24
2	"Vaivorykštė"	6	6	6	18
3	"Draugystės daina"	10	8	10	28
4	"Neklaužada"	8	7	8	23
5	"Aš noriu šokti"	12	12	12	36

==== Semi-final 4 ====
The fourth semi-final was held on 30 September 2007. Two entries qualified to the final. The entry that received the most points from a three-member jury panel qualified for the final. An additional qualifier was selected from the remaining four entries by televoting. The members of the jury consisted of Vytautas Juozapaitis, Eva and Tomas Sinickis.

R/O	Artist	Song	Jury		Public		Result
R/O	Artist	Song	Votes	Place	Televote	Place	Result
1	Nenuoramos	"Jei turėčiau sparnus"	22	4	295	2	Eliminated
2	Laura Slabadaitė	"O, Elvi Presli"	24	3	245	4	Eliminated
3	Lukas Gedvilas	"Vaikystės daina"	19	5	310	1	Advanced
4	Miglė Šidlauskaitė and L. Do	"Noriu…"	36	1	44	5	Advanced
5	Sigita Padvariškytė	"Mano svajonėse"	28	2	246	3	Eliminated

Detailed Jury Votes
R/O	Song	V. Juozapaitis	Eva	T. Sinickis	Total
1	"Jei turėčiau sparnus"	8	7	7	22
2	"O, Elvi Presli"	6	8	10	24
3	"Vaikystės daina"	7	6	6	19
4	"Noriu..."	12	12	12	36
5	"Mano svajonėse"	10	10	8	28

==== Semi-final 5 ====
The fifth semi-final was held on 7 October 2007. Two entries qualified to the final. The entry that received the most points from a three-member jury panel qualified for the final. An additional qualifier was selected from the remaining four entries by televoting. The members of the jury consisted of Jurgis Didžiulis, Raigardas Tautkus and Vladas Kovaliovas.

R/O	Artist	Song	Jury		Public		Result
R/O	Artist	Song	Votes	Place	Televote	Place	Result
1	Gintarė Ivoškaitė	"Draugystės daina"	20	5	105	3	Eliminated
2	Indrė Kazakauskaitė	"Pabėgsiu iš miesto"	22	4	93	4	Eliminated
3	Tikros	"Mintys"	24	3	211	1	Advanced
4	Lauksvė Gulbinaitė	"Draugiški vampyrai"	29	2	202	2	Eliminated
5	Urtė	"Saulė"	32	1	91	5	Advanced

Detailed Jury Votes
R/O	Song	J. Didžiulis	R. Tautkus	V. Kovaliovas	Total
1	"Draugystės daina"	8	6	6	20
2	"Pabėgsiu iš miesto"	7	7	8	22
3	"Mintys"	6	8	12	24
4	"Draugiški vampyrai"	12	10	7	29
5	"Saulė"	10	12	10	32

==== Semi-final 6 ====
The sixth semi-final was held on 14 October 2007. Two entries qualified to the final. The entry that received the most points from a three-member jury panel qualified for the final. An additional qualifier was selected from the remaining four entries by televoting. The members of the jury consisted of Aras Vėberis, Rosita Čivilytė and Nėrius Pečiūra.

R/O	Artist	Song	Jury		Public		Result
R/O	Artist	Song	Votes	Place	Televote	Place	Result
1	Austėja and Goda	"Liksime vaikai"	26	3	724	1	Advanced
2	Elvina Milkauskaitė	"Didelės svajonės"	20	4	237	2	Wildcard
3	Nojus Bartaška	"Amžinai"	28	2	172	4	Eliminated
4	Lina Jurevičiūtė	"Kai miestas snaudžia"	36	1	147	5	Advanced
5	Keberiokšt	"Ruduo mieste"	19	5	208	3	Eliminated

Detailed Jury Votes
R/O	Song	A. Vėberis	R. Čivilytė	N. Pečiūra	Total
1	"Liksime vaikai"	8	8	10	26
2	"Didelės svajonės"	7	7	6	20
3	"Amžinai"	10	10	8	28
4	"Kai miestas snaudžia"	12	12	12	36
5	"Ruduo mieste"	6	6	7	19

==== Final ====
The final was held on 21 October 2007 at 11:50 CEST in the LRT TV Studios in Vilnius, where 12 participants competed. The winner was chosen by televoting (50%) and a five-member "expert" jury (50%). The members of the jury consisted of Rosita Čivilytė, Darius Užkuraitis, Saulius Urbonavičius, Laurynas Šarkinas and Deivis.

R/O	Artist	Song	Jury	Public		Total	Place
R/O	Artist	Song	Jury	Televote	Points	Total	Place
1	Austėja and Goda	"Liksime vaikai"	22	1695	60	82	2
2	Elvina Milkauskaitė	"Didelės svajonės"	28	1065	35	63	4
3	Greta Razmislavičiūtė	"Nykštukai"	29	741	30	59	6
4	Trio GIG	"Draugystės daina"	13	354	15	28	9
5	Tikros	"Mintys"	9	315	10	19	11
6	Lina Jurevičiūtė	"Kai miestas snaudžia"	60	1080	50	110	1
7	Miglė Šidlauskaitė	"Noriu"	31	244	0	31	8
8	Monika Valiuškytė	"Aš noriu šokti"	35	608	25	60	5
9	Monika Linkytė	"Vaikystės pasaka"	32	1071	40	72	3
10	Lukas Gedvilas	"Vaikystės daina"	13	393	20	33	7
11	Evelina Bučinskaitė	"Čia ir dabar"	0	215	0	0	12
12	Urtė	"Saulė"	18	295	5	23	10

Detailed Jury Votes
R/O	Song	R. Čivilytė	D. Užkuraitis	S. Urbonavičius	L. Šarkinas	Deivis	Total
1	"Liksime vaikai"	6	6	2	6	2	22
2	"Didėles svajonės"	5	5	7	8	3	28
3	"Nykštukai"	4	2	6	7	10	29
4	"Draugystės daina"	1	4	4	4		13
5	"Mintys"	2	3	1	2	1	9
6	"Kai miestas snaudžia"	12	12	12	12	12	60
7	"Noriu"	10		8	5	8	31
8	"Aš noriu šokti"	8	10	10	3	4	35
9	"Vaikystės pasaka"	7	8		10	7	32
10	"Vaikystės daina"		1	5	1	6	13
11	"Čia ir dabar"						0
12	"Saulė"	3	7	3		5	18

== At Junior Eurovision ==
=== Voting ===
Points awarded to Lithuania
Score	Country
12 points (Note: All countries received one set of 12 points to ensure no country finished with nul points.)	
10 points	
8 points	Georgia
7 points	
6 points	
5 points	
4 points	
3 points	Serbia
2 points	Macedonia; Netherlands; Russia; Ukraine
1 point	Belarus; Belgium

Points awarded by Lithuania
Score	Country
12 points	Belarus
10 points	Georgia
8 points	Sweden
7 points	Ukraine
6 points	Serbia
5 points	Macedonia
4 points	Russia
3 points	Malta
2 points	Bulgaria
1 point	Romania
