= Davor Jovanović =

Serbian singer (born 1988)

- Давор Јовановић
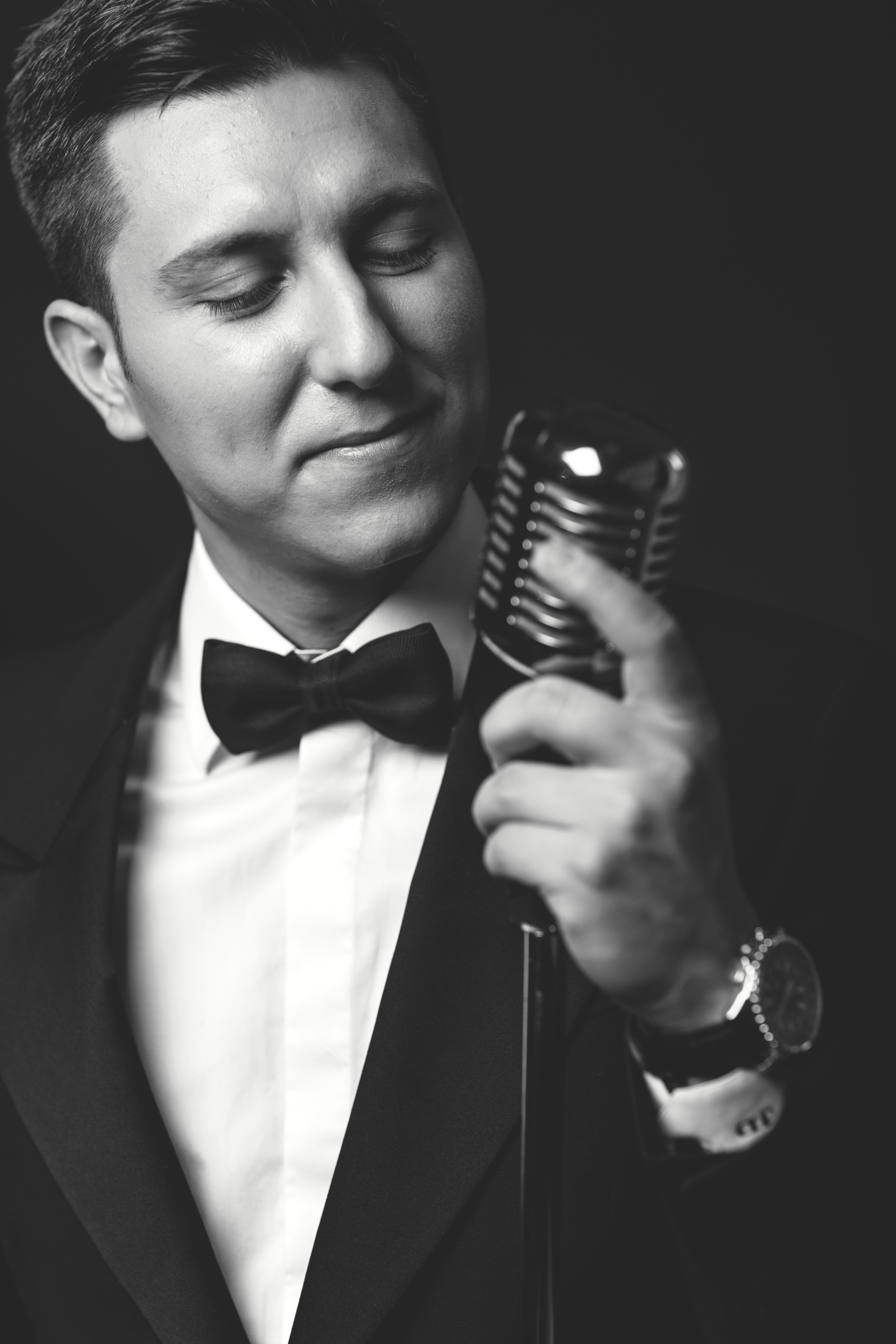
- Born: 27 August 1988 (age 38); Kladovo, Yugoslavia
- Occupations: Singer; Composer; Song producer
- Years active: 2011–present
- Spouse: Milica Bungin (m. 2022)
- Website: davorjovanovic.com

Davor Jovanović (Serbian: Давор Јовановић, born 27 August 1988) is a Serbian singer, composer, and songwriter.

== Early ==
Jovanović played the accordion at music school, but later switched to the guitar. At the age of fourteen, he stopped playing folklore and devoted himself entirely to singing with his father as a backing vocalist. Jovanović also played guitar (both acoustic and bass) in the orchestra that accompanied the folklore ensemble.

Upon graduating from the Secondary School of Electrical Engineering, Jovanović came to Belgrade in 2007. He majored in music production with a score of 10 and became an engineer in video technology.

== Career ==
In December 2011, Jovanović participated in Prvi glas Srbije and won. Later, he emphasised that he had previously applied for Zvezde Granda, but had given up on it. However, in 2015, together with the winner from the second season, Mirna Radulović, Jovanović sued Prva Srpska Televizija for not fulfilling the points of the contract, as well as for not winning the award.

After the competition, Jovanović became a singer-songwriter and debuted with the official single "Ja Leđa Ljubavi Nisam Okrenuo" (Serbian: Ја леђа љубави нисам окренуо, lit. 'I Haven't Turned My Back on Love') in 2013.

== Personal life ==
In 2021, Jovanović married his long-time girlfriend, Milica Bungin. They welcomed a son in November 2022.

== Discography ==
| Title | Year | Ref. |
|---|---|---|
| "Ja Leđa Ljubavi Nisam Okrenuo" (Serbian: Ја леђа љубави нисам окренуо) | 2013 | |
| "Dođi, dođi" (Serbian: Дођи, дођи) | 2014 | |
