= Prvi glas Srbije =

Serbian television series

- Genre: Music television
- Presented by: Andrija Milošević; Marija Kilibarda
- Judges: Vlado Georgiev (2011–2012); Saša Milošević (2011–2012); Aleksandra Radović (2012); Lena Kovačević (2011)
- Country of origin: Serbia
- Original language: Serbian
- No. of seasons: 2
- No. of episodes: 39

Production
- Running time: 60 minutes (auditions); 120-240 minutes (finals)

Original release
- Network: Prva Srpska Televizija
- Release: September 10, 2011 – January 20, 2013

Prvi Glas Srbije (Serbian: Први глас Србије, lit. 'The First Voice of Serbia') is a Serbian television music competition show which premiered on Prva Srpska Televizija in 2011. In 2013, it was announced that the series would end broadcast after two seasons.

== Format ==
The participants appear before the jury and present themselves with two songs, with their choice of one pop and folk song each. They must have at least two positive votes from the three-member jury to advance to the workshops. If the contestant does not advance to the next phase of the competition, the ground opens up under them and they fall into a hole.

Once the auditions are done, the judges call all contestants who have gone through to perform again to select more acts that will advance in the competition. Afterwards, the judges figure out who will go to the next phase, can mentor, and get the highest score. During this phase, acts are divided in groups and perform in front of their mentors. As a prize, the winner receives the recording of their debut album and a large sum of money.

== Series overview ==
Series	Series premiere	Series finale	Winner
1	9 September 2011	26 December 2011	Davor Jovanović
2	9 September 2012	20 January 2013	Mirna Radulović

== Reception ==
In terms of viewership, the second season surpassed the first season due to both the number of viewers and the greater popularity of the contestants and the show itself in the media and on social media networks.
