= Žar ptica (album) =

Studio album by Aleksandra Radović
- Released: June 19, 2009
- Recorded: 2007–2009
- Genres: Pop, R&B
- Length: 51:22
- Label: City Records

Aleksandra Radović chronology
Dommino (2006)	Žar ptica (2009)	Carstvo (2016)

Singles from Žar ptica
- 1. "Nemoj" Released: March 2009; 2. "Bivši dragi" Released: 2010

Žar ptica is the third album from the Serbian singer Aleksandra Radović, released by City Records on 19 June 2009. The album was produced and arranged in Serbia, Croatia and Macedonia, in famous studios of Aleksandra Milutinović, Nikša Bratoš and Darko Dimitrov. She composed and wrote lyric for altogether 4 songs. Songs like "Bivši dragi", "Brod budala", "Ni zadnji, ni prvi" become popular in very short time. Album gained immediately success in Serbia, Montenegro, Bosnia and Macedonia and was top selling album for 3 months.

== Background and promotion ==
She worked on third album with Aleksandra Milutinović, Goran Kovačić, Darko Dimitrov, Nikša Bratoš and famous Croatian singer-songwriter Arsen Dedić. The album promotion single was song "Nemoj", written by Aleksandra Radović, composed and produced by Darko Dimitrov. Radović said that this song and many other songs from the album would have more R&B sound, like songs from Beyoncé Knowles and Jennifer Hudson.

== Touring ==
Album second single is set to be Bivši dragi. The song already became popular on the radio and scored best places on almost every radio top lists. Radović announced that she would start tour in Sava Centar in Belgrade, and then visit 20 cities in Serbia. She said that she would also tour through Macedonia and Bosnia and Herzegovina.

Because of big interest for concert, she announced that she would have two concerts in Sava Centar, and she became the first woman to have two concerts in Sava Centar. Concerts were scheduled on 18 and 19 November, but because of sudden death of Serbian Patriarch Pavle they were moved to 1 and 5 December.

She announced after concert that rumors that she is retiring are false and that she will be singing for the next 15 years.

== Track listing ==
1. "Bivši dragi" (4:31)
  (Aleksandra Radović / Aleksandra Radović / Darko Dimitrov)
2. "Brod budala" (3:29)
  (Darko Dimitrov / Ljiljana Jorgovanović / Darko Dimitrov)
3. "Daleko od očiju" (2:57)
  (Aleksandra Milutinović / Aleksandra Milutinović / Nikša Bratoš)
4. "Otpiši sve bivše" (3:52)
  (Goran Kovačić / Aleksandra Milutinović / Nikša Bratoš)
5. "Mirno more" (4:29)
  (Goran Kovačić / Goran Kovačić / Nikša Bratoš)
6. "Ni zadnji, ni prvi" (4:05)
  (Goran Kovačić / Arsen Dedić / Nikša Bratoš)
7. "Da te ne volim bar" (6:02)
  (Aleksandra Milutinović / Aleksandra Milutinović / Nikša Bratoš)
8. "Nemoj" (4:08)
  (Darko Dimitrov / Aleksandra Radović / Darko Dimitrov)
9. "Odavno" (4:51)
  (Aleksandra Radović / Aleksandra Radović / Nikša Bratoš)
10. "Ne reci mi" (4:58)
  (Aleksandra Milutinović / Aleksandra Milutinović / Nikša Bratoš)
11. "Sve bih dala za ljubav" (3:51)
  (Darko Dimitrov / Aleksandra Radović / Darko Dimitrov)
12. "Gde je tu ljubav?" (4:09)
  (Aleksandra Milutinović / Aleksandra Milutinović / Darko Dimitrov)
