= Armenia in the Junior Eurovision Song Contest =

- Junior Eurovision Song Contest
- Participating broadcaster: Armenian Public Television (AMPTV)

Participation summary
- Appearances: 19
- First appearance: 2007
- Highest placement: 1st: 2010, 2021, 2026
- Host: 2011, 2022
- Participation history: 2007; 2008; 2009; 2010; 2011; 2012; 2013; 2014; 2015; 2016; 2017; 2018; 2019; ~~2020~~; 2021; 2022; 2023; 2024; 2025; 2026

Related articles
- Depi Mankakan Evratesil

External links
- AMPTV page
- For the most recent participation see Armenia in the Junior Eurovision Song Contest 2026

Armenia has been represented at the Junior Eurovision Song Contest since 2007. The Armenian participating broadcaster in the contest is the Armenian Public Television (AMPTV).

Its first entry at the 2007 contest was "Erazanq" (Երազանք) by Arevik, which finished in second place out of 17 participants, achieving a score of 136 points. Since its debut, Armenia had never missed an edition of the contest, with the exception of 2020 (due to the 2020 Nagorno-Karabakh war), and it has never placed outside of the top ten, additionally the nation won three times, in 2010 with the song "Mama" (Մամա) by Vladimir Arzumanyan, in 2021 with the song "Qami Qami" (Քամի Քամի) by Maléna and in 2026 with the song "Boo!" by Naré. The nation has also finished as the runner-up five times, and has placed third three times since its debut, respectfully. Meanwhile, its worst result to date was achieved by two representatives: L.E.V.O.N. at the Junior Eurovision Song Contest 2018 with his song "L.E.V.O.N" and Karina Ignatyan at the Junior Eurovision Song Contest 2019 with her song "Colours of Your Dream", both placing ninth. Armenia hosted the contest at the Karen Demirchyan Complex in Yerevan in 2011 and again in 2022.

== History ==
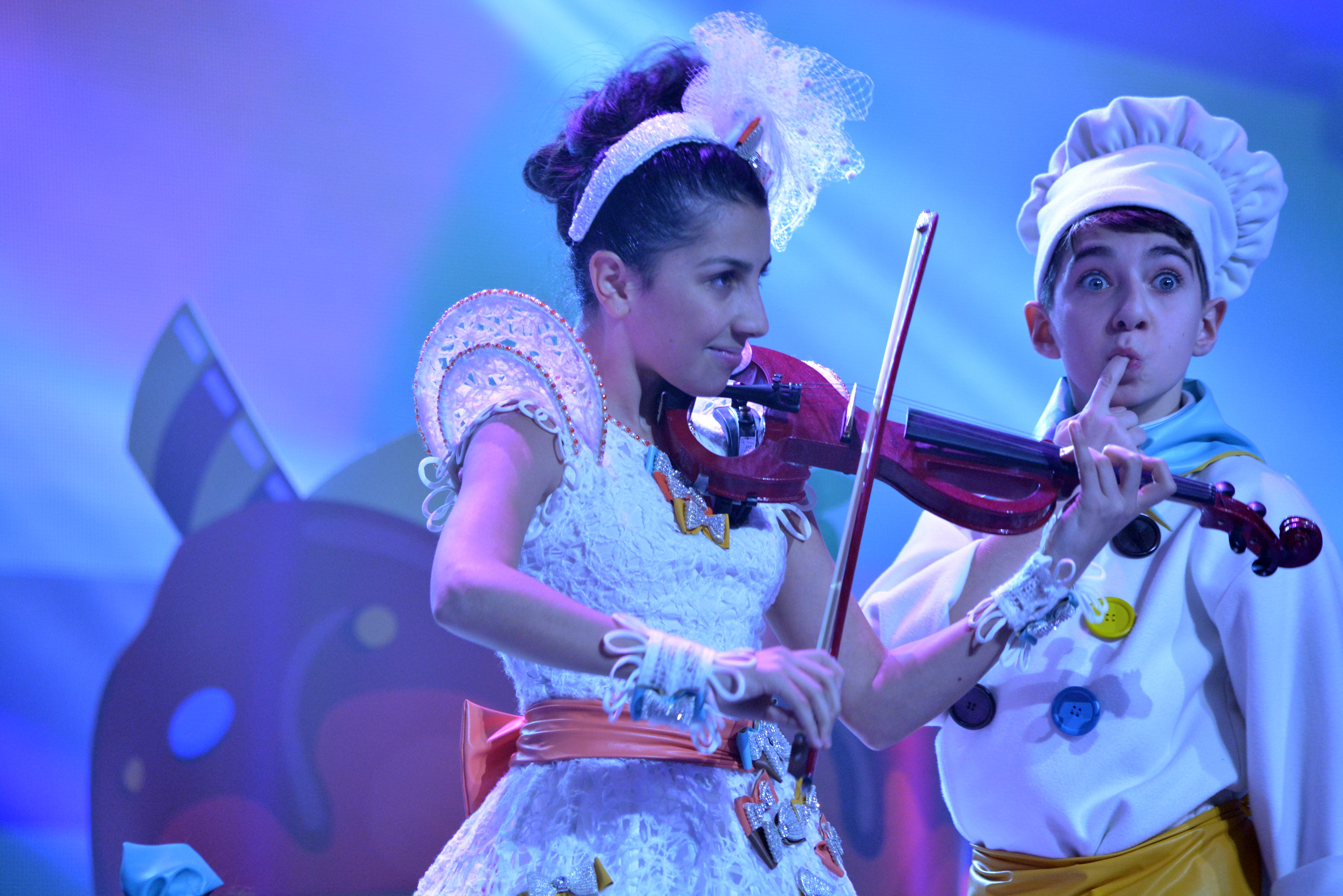
Monica at the Junior Eurovision Song Contest 2013 in Kyiv

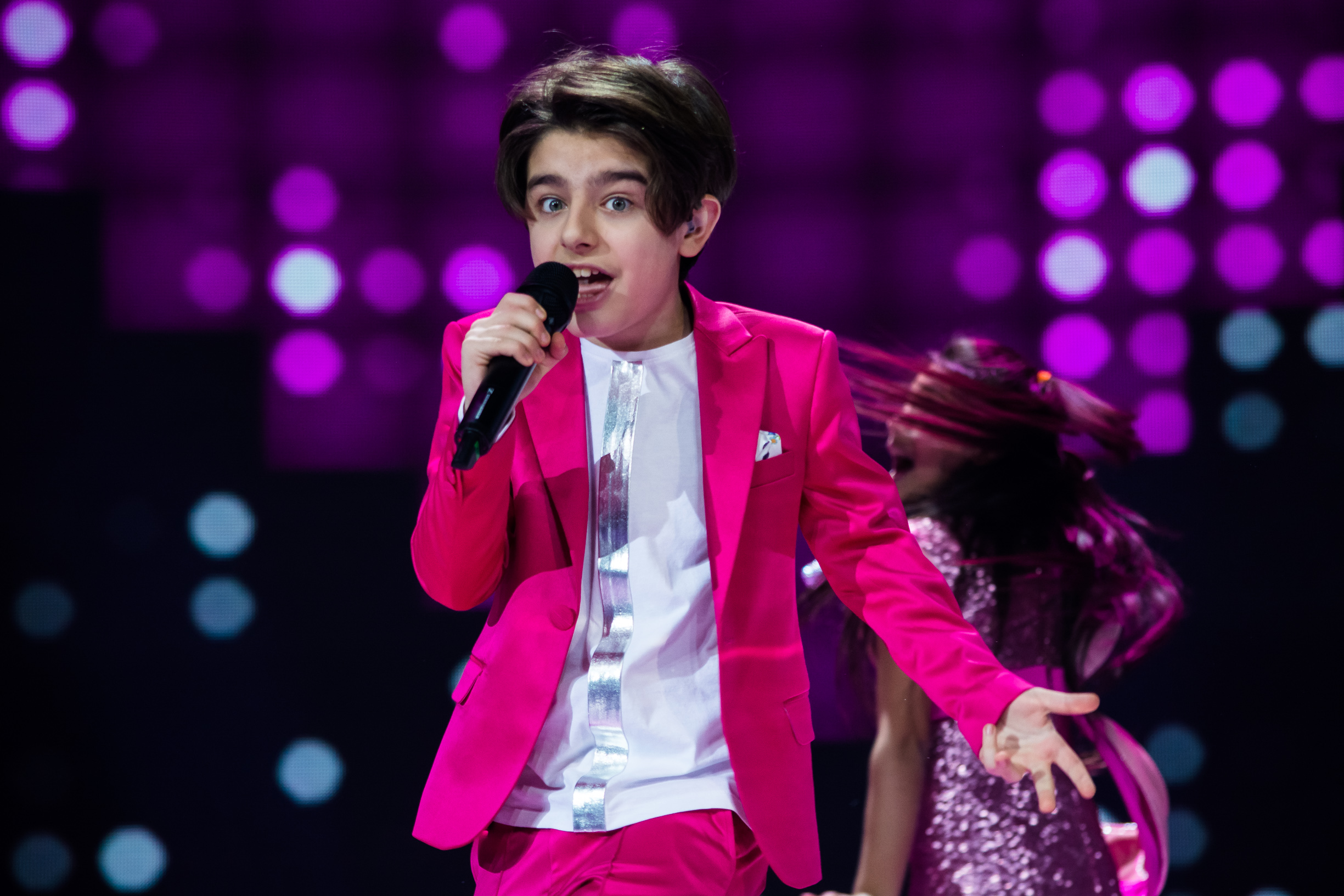
Mika at the Junior Eurovision Song Contest 2015 in Sofia

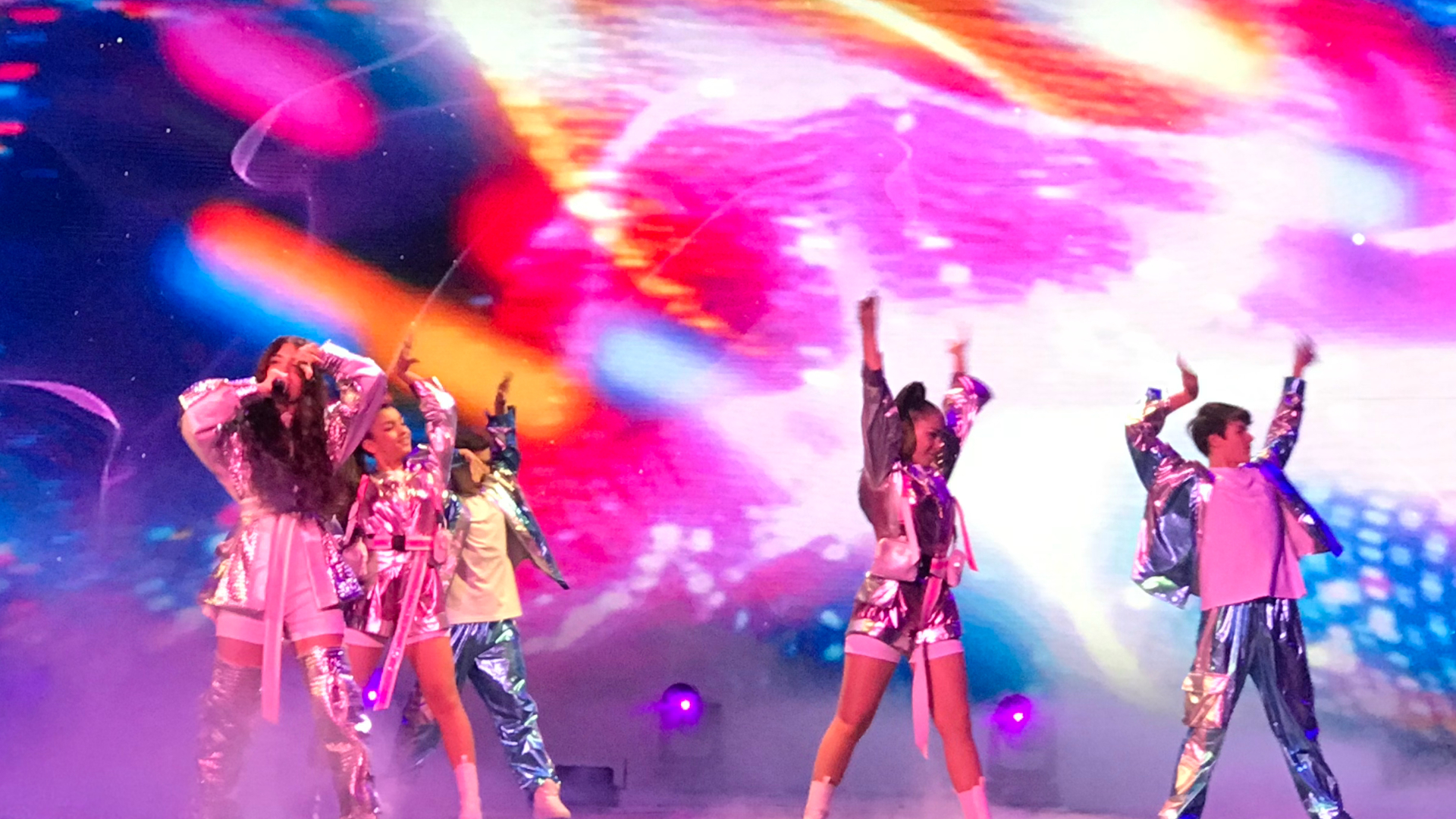
Maléna at the Junior Eurovision Song Contest 2021 in Paris

Armenian broadcaster Armenian Public Television (AMPTV), announced on 21 May 2007 that they would be making their Junior Eurovision debut at the 2007 contest in Rotterdam, Netherlands on 8 December 2007. AMPTV internally selected Arevik as their debut entrant with the song "Erazanq" (Armenian: Երազանք). At the running order draw for Junior Eurovision 2007, Armenia was drawn third, following Belgium and preceding Cyprus, where they finished in second place scoring 136 points.

Following their debut success, Armenia continued to participate in the Junior Eurovision Song Contest, finishing in third place on three occasions (2012, 2014 and 2023), runners-up at five contests (2007, 2009, 2015, 2016, and 2022), and achieving their first win at the Junior Eurovision Song Contest 2010 with the song "Mama" (Armenian: Մամա), performed by Vladimir Arzumanyan achieving 120 points.

Armenia was the host country of the Junior Eurovision Song Contest 2011, which took place on 3 December at the Karen Demirchyan Sports and Concerts Complex located in the Armenian capital, Yerevan. It was the first time in history of the Junior Eurovision Song Contest that the contest was held in the previous year's winning country. AMPTV was the main organiser of the show, being provided financial aid from the EBU made of entrance fees from the participating broadcasters, while Swedish company HD Resources assisted with the technical side of the production.

The Armenian broadcaster announced on 21 July 2016 that Armenia would be participating at the contest being held in Valletta, Malta on 20 November 2016. AMPTV announced on 10 August 2016 that they had internally selected Anahit Adamyan and Mary Vardanyan to represent them at the contest, singing the song "Tarber". They placed second with total 232 points. This placed them only seven points behind Georgia.

On 26 February 2018, AMPTV revealed that their 12th Junior Eurovision entry would be selected using Depi Mankakan Evratesil. The final of Depi Mankakan Evratesil 2018 took place on 22 September 2018, and was won by Levon Galstyan with his entry, "L.E.V.O.N." The 2018 Contest took place on 25 November where Armenia would place 9th with 125 points in a field of 20 competitors. This would also mark Armenia's worst result. In 2019, Depi Mankakan Evratesil was used again with a different selection format. The final of the show took place on 15 September where Karina Ignatyan was selected with her entry "Colours of Your Dream." The 2019 contest took place on 24 November where Armenia once again placed 9th with 115 points in a field of 19 competitors. This tied Armenia's worst result once again.

Despite being included on the final list of participating countries, AMPTV announced its withdrawal from the 2020 contest on 5 November 2020 due to the ongoing Nagorno-Karabakh war. It was later revealed that Maléna had been internally selected to represent Armenia and later released her intended entry "Why" on 29 November 2020. With the Nagorno-Karabakh War ceasefire agreement on 10 November, Armenia's head of delegation David Tserunyan announced on Instagram post that the country "will come back stronger than ever". On 2 September 2021, it was confirmed by the EBU that Armenia would return to the 2021 contest in France. AMPTV announced on 17 November 2021 that it had reselected Maléna, and fully revealed her entry "Qami Qami" on 19 November 2021. The contest took place on 19 December 2021 and Maléna ultimately won the contest with 224 points. Armenia placed third with the Jury Vote receiving 115 points, and it had won the Online Vote with 109 points. After her victory, Maléna returned to Armenia where she landed at Zvartnots International Airport in Yerevan and was greeted by a crowd of fans and press.

Following Armenia's victory, the EBU confirmed on 21 December 2021 that Armenia would host the Junior Eurovision Song Contest 2022. Later it was confirmed that the contest would be held in the Karen Demirchyan Complex in Yerevan on 11 December 2022, it would also be the same venue where the 2011 Contest was held. Armenia internally Nare with the song "Dance!", which finished second place with 180 points. This result gave Armenia its fifth runner-up result in the Contest.

In 2023, Armenia was represented by Yan Girls and the song "Do It My Way", which finished third out of sixteen participants with 180 points. In the 2024 contest, Armenia was represented by Leo with the song "Cosmic Friend", placing eighth out of seventeen with 125 points.

In the 2025 contest, AMPTV internally selected Albert, with the song "Brave Heart". Armenia ultimately finished in fourth place, scoring 175 points. In wake of Armenia–Azerbaijan peace agreement initialed earlier that year, the Azerbaijani national jury awarded Armenia with 3 points, marking the first time in any Eurovision event that Azerbaijan's jury awarded points to Armenia.

In 2026 Armenia won for the third time with Narè and her song “Boo!” with 202 points, finsihing third with the juries and first in the public vote.

== Participation overview ==
Table key
1	First place
2	Second place
3	Third place
◇	Entry selected but did not compete

Year	Artist	Song	Language	Place	Points
2007	Arevik	"Erazanq" (Երազանք)	Armenian	2	136
2008	Monica Manucharova	"Im ergi hnchyune" (Իմ երգի հնչյունը)	Armenian	8	59
2009	Luara Hayrapetyan	"Barcelona" (Բարսելոնա)	Armenian	2	116
2010	Vladimir Arzumanyan	"Mama" (Մամա)	Armenian	1	120
2011	Dalita	"Welcome to Armenia"	Armenian, English	5	85
2012	Compass Band	"Sweetie Baby"	Armenian, English	3	98
2013	Monika	"Choco-Factory"	Armenian, English	6	69
2014	Betty	"People of the Sun"	Armenian, English	3	146
2015	Mika	"Love"	Armenian, English	2	176
2016	Anahit and Mary	"Tarber" (Տարբեր)	Armenian, English	2	232
2017	Misha	"Boomerang"	Armenian, English	6	148
2018	L.E.V.O.N	"L.E.V.O.N"	Armenian	9	125
2019	Karina Ignatyan	"Colours of Your Dream"	Armenian, English	9	115
2020	Maléna ◇	"Why" ◇	Armenian, English ◇	Withdrawn	
2021	Maléna	"Qami Qami" (Քամի Քամի)	Armenian, English	1	224
2022	Nare	"Dance!"	Armenian, English	2	180
2023	Yan Girls	"Do It My Way"	Armenian, English	3	180
2024	Leo	"Cosmic Friend"	Armenian, English	8	125
2025	Albert	"Brave Heart"	Armenian	4	175
2026	Naré	"Boo!"	Armenian, English	1	202

== Commentators and spokespersons ==
The contests are broadcast online worldwide through the official Junior Eurovision Song Contest website junioreurovision.tv and YouTube. In 2015, the online broadcasts featured commentary in English by junioreurovision.tv editor Luke Fisher and 2011 Bulgarian Junior Eurovision Song Contest entrant Ivan Ivanov. The Armenian broadcaster, AMPTV, send their own commentators to each contest in order to provide commentary in the Armenian language. Spokespersons were also chosen by the national broadcaster in order to announce the awarding points from Armenia. The table below list the details of each commentator and spokesperson since 2007.

Year	Commentator	Spokesperson	Ref.
2007	Gohar Gasparyan and Felix Khachatryan	Ani Sahakyan	
2008	Gohar Gasparyan	Mary Sahakyan	
2009	Gohar Gasparyan	Razmik Aghajanyan	
2010	Gohar Gasparyan and Artak Vardanyan	Nadya Sargsyan	
2011	Artak Vardanyan and Marianna Javakhyan	Razmik Aghajanyan	
2012	Gohar Gasparyan	Mika	
2013	Dalita and Vahe Khanamiryan	David Vardanyan	
2014	Avet Barseghyan	Monika Avanesyan	
2015	Avet Barseghyan	Betty	
2016	Avet Barseghyan	Mika	
2017	Gohar Gasparyan	Lilit Tokhatyan	
2018	Mika and Dalita	Vardan Margaryan	
2019	Avet Barseghyan and Mane Grigoryan	Erik Antonyan	
2020	No broadcast	Did not participate	N/A
2021	Arman Margaryan and Hrachuhi Utmazyan	Karina Ignatyan	
2022	Hamlet Arakelyan and Hrachuhi Utmazyan	Maléna	
2023	Hamlet Arakelyan and Hrachuhi Utmazyan	Lino Mercier	
2024	Sevak Hakobyan and Hrachuhi Utmazyan	Nané Andreasyan	
2025	Hamlet Arakelyan and Hrachuhi Utmazyan	Nare	
2026	Hamlet Arakelyan and Hrachuhi Utmazyan	Albert	

== Hostings ==
Year	Location	Venue	Presenters	Ref.
2011	Yerevan	Karen Demirchyan Complex	Gohar Gasparyan and Avet Barseghyan	
2022	Yerevan	Karen Demirchyan Complex	Iveta Mukuchyan, Garik Papoyan and Karina Ignatyan	

== See also ==
- Armenia in the Eurovision Song Contest – Senior version of the Junior Eurovision Song Contest.
- Armenia in the Eurovision Young Dancers – A competition organised by the EBU for younger dancers aged between 16 and 21.
- Armenia in the Eurovision Young Musicians – A competition organised by the EBU for musicians aged 18 years and younger.
- Armenia–Azerbaijan relations in the Eurovision Song Contest – Relations between the two countries in the Junior and Senior Eurovision Song Contests.
