= Australia in the Junior Eurovision Song Contest =

- Junior Eurovision Song Contest
- Participating broadcaster: Special Broadcasting Service (SBS; 2015–2016); Australian Broadcasting Corporation (ABC; 2017-2019)

Participation summary
- Appearances: 5
- First appearance: 2015
- Last appearance: 2019
- Highest placement: 3rd: 2017, 2018
- Participation history: 2015; 2016; 2017; 2018; 2019; 2020 – 2026
- For the most recent participation see Australia in the Junior Eurovision Song Contest 2019

Australia has been represented at the Junior Eurovision Song Contest five times between 2015 and 2019. Special Broadcasting Service (SBS), an associate member of the European Broadcasting Union (EBU), participated at the 2015 and 2016 contests, with the Australian Broadcasting Corporation (ABC) taking over from 2017. SBS previously broadcast every edition of the Junior Eurovision Song Contest on a delay.

The first representative to participate for the nation at the 2015 contest was Bella Paige with the song "My Girls", which finished in eighth place out of seventeen participating entries, achieving a score of sixty-four points. Australia continued their participation at the 2016 contest, having internally selected Alexa Curtis with her song "We Are", which finished in fifth place, scoring 202 points. Isabella Clarke in 2017 and Jael Wena in 2018 both placed 3rd, Australia's best results to date. After finishing eighth with Jordan Anthony in 2019, Australia announced their withdrawal from the 2020 contest due to the COVID-19 pandemic. The country has not returned to the contest since.

== History ==
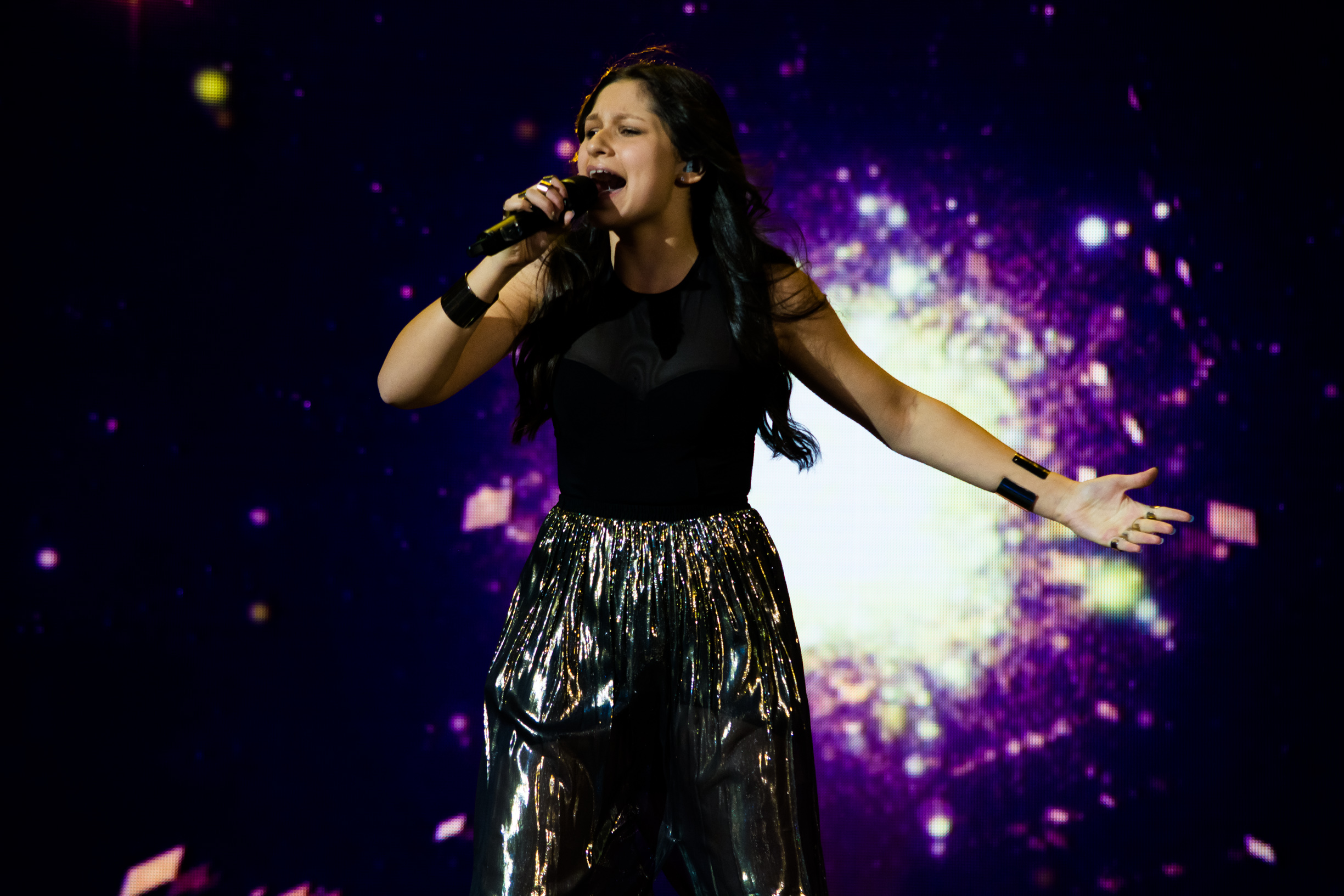
Bella Paige at the Junior Eurovision Song Contest 2015 in Sofia

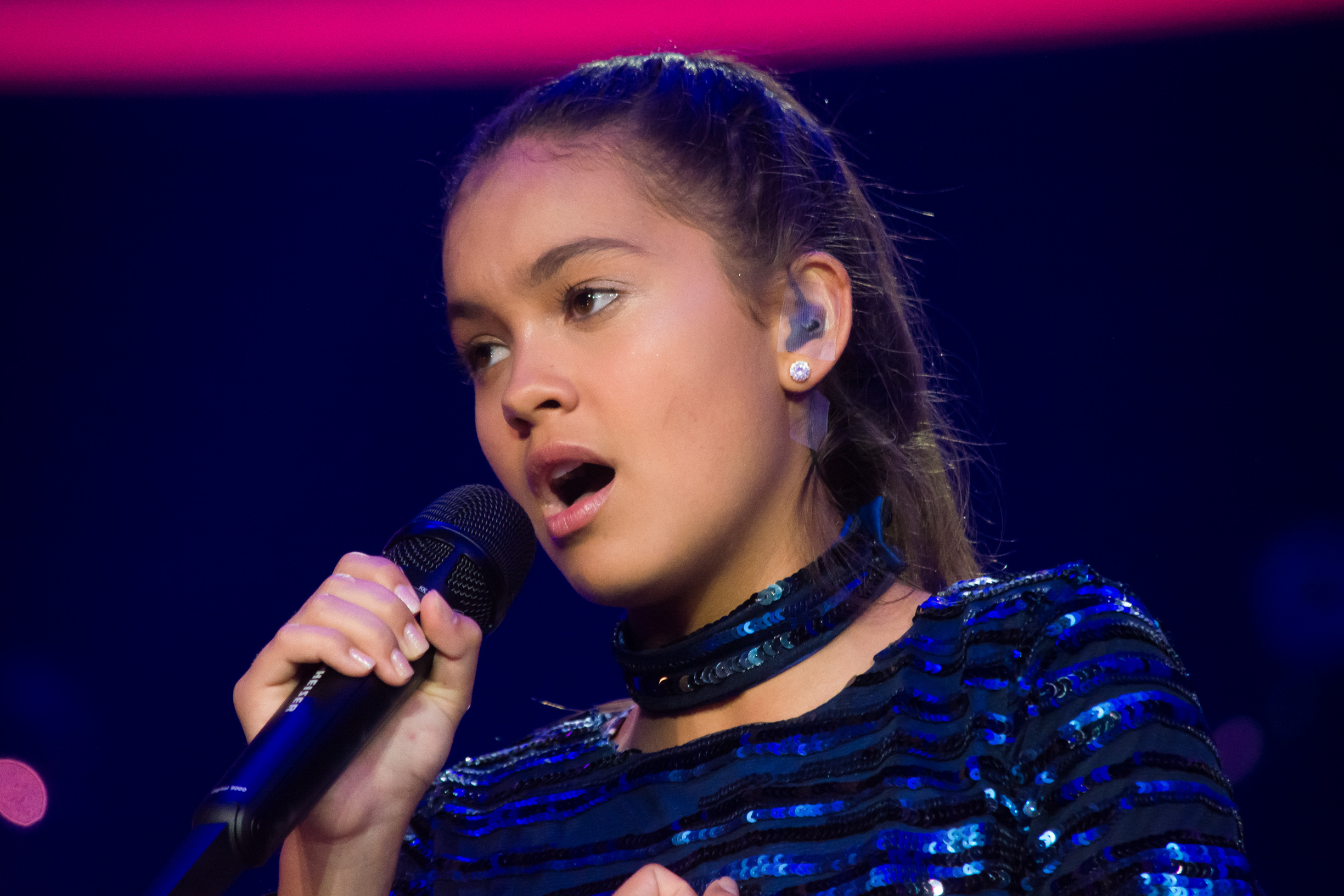
Alexa Curtis at the Junior Eurovision Song Contest 2016 in Valletta

On 7 October 2015, the Australian national broadcaster Special Broadcasting Service (SBS) announced that they would be making their Junior Eurovision debut at the 2015 contest, in Sofia, Bulgaria, following on from their success at the Eurovision Song Contest 2015. SBS internally selected Bella Paige as their debut representative, with the song "My Girls". At the running order draw which took place on 15 November 2015, Australia were drawn to perform sixth on 21 November 2015, following Netherlands and preceding Ireland, where she finished in eighth place scoring 64 points. This is Australia's worst result in their contest history. It was achieved again at the 2019 contest in Gliwice, Poland.

Australian broadcaster SBS, announced on 12 September 2016 that they would be continuing their participation at the Junior Eurovision Song Contest, and would once again internally select their entrant for the 2016 Contest, which took place on 20 November 2016, in Valletta, Malta. Alexa Curtis was announced on 29 September 2016 as being their participant, and would represent Australia with the song "We Are". During the opening ceremony and the running order draw which took place on 14 November 2016, Australia was drawn to perform fourteenth on 20 November 2016, following Israel and preceding the Netherlands, where she finished in fifth place achieving 202 points, their best result at the time until Isabella Clarke's participation of the 2017 edition and Jael (2018 Junior Eurovision Song Contest) both being placed 3rd place overall.

In July 2020, Australian broadcaster SBS announced that they would not participate in the 2020 contest due to the COVID-19 pandemic. The country has not returned to the contest since.

== Participation overview ==
Table key
| 3 | Third place |

| Year | Artist | Song | Language | Place | Points |
|---|---|---|---|---|---|
| 2015 | Bella Paige | "My Girls" | English | 8 | 64 |
| 2016 | Alexa Curtis | "We Are" | English | 5 | 202 |
| 2017 | Isabella Clarke | "Speak Up" | English | 3 | 172 |
| 2018 | Jael | "Champion" | English | 3 | 201 |
| 2019 | Jordan Anthony | "We Will Rise" | English | 8 | 121 |

== Commentators and spokespersons ==
The contest are broadcast online worldwide through the official Junior Eurovision Song Contest website junioreurovision.tv and YouTube. In 2015, the online broadcasts featured commentary in English by junioreurovision.tv editor Luke Fisher and 2011 Bulgarian Junior Eurovision Song Contest entrant Ivan Ivanov. The Australian broadcaster send their own commentary team to each contest in order to provide commentary in the English language. Spokespersons were also chosen by the national broadcaster in order to announce the awarding points from Australia. The table below list the details of each commentator and spokesperson since 2003.

| Year | Channel | Commentator | Spokesperson | Ref. |
|---|---|---|---|---|
| 2003 | SBS TV | Des Mangan | Did not participate | |
| 2004–2012 | SBS TV | No commentator | Did not participate | |
| 2013 | SBS Two | Andre Nookadu and Georgia McCarthy | Did not participate | |
| 2014 | SBS Two | Andre Nookadu and Georgia McCarthy | Did not participate | |
| 2015 | SBS One | Ash London and Toby Truslove | Ellie Blackwell | |
| 2016 | SBS One | No commentator | Sebastian Hill | |
| 2017 | ABC Me | Pip Rasmussen, Tim Mathews and Grace Koh | Liam Clarke | |
| 2018 | ABC Me | Grace Koh, Pip Rasmussen and Lawrence Gunatilaka | Ksenia Galetskaya | |
| 2019 | ABC Me | Pip Rasmussen, Drew Parker and Ava Madon | Szymon | |
| 2020–2026 | No broadcast | | Did not participate | |

== See also ==
- Australia in the ABU Radio Song Festival – Radio event organised by the Asia-Pacific Broadcasting Union (ABU).
- Australia in the ABU TV Song Festival – Television event organised by the ABU.
- Australia in the Eurovision Song Contest – Senior version of the Junior Eurovision Song Contest.
