= Australia in the Junior Eurovision Song Contest 2015 =

First Australian Eurovision performance

- Junior Eurovision Song Contest 2015
- Participating broadcaster: Special Broadcasting Service (SBS)
- Country: Australia
- Selection process: Internal selection
- Announcement date: 8 October 2015

Competing entry
- Song: "My Girls"
- Artist: Bella Paige

Placement
- Final result: 8th, 64 points

Participation chronology

Australia participated for the first time in the Junior Eurovision Song Contest at the 2015 edition in Sofia, Bulgaria with the song "My Girls" by Bella Paige.

== Before Junior Eurovision ==
=== Internal selection ===
On 7 October 2015 it was announced that Australia would debut in Sofia. It was also announced that they would announce their artist and song on 9 October 2015. On that day, Bella Paige was selected to represent Australia.

== Artist and song information ==
"My message to my fans speaks through the lyrics to ‘My Girls’. ‘My Girls’ is a beautiful song with a powerful message to all girls. No matter what ups and downs they go through, it is important to stay strong, support each other, believe in yourself, dream big and know you can achieve your goals and dreams. When I sing this song, I think about the special girls in my life - my mum and sister, who love and support me unconditionally. I hope this song encourages everyone to love, support and believe in themselves and realise how beautiful and special they are inside and out."

—Bella Paige

(Australia) "My Girls"

Junior Eurovision Song Contest 2015 entry
- Country: Australia
- Artist: Bella Paige
- Languages: English
- Composers: Delta Goodrem, Vince Pizzinga, Mitch Allan
- Lyricists: Delta Goodrem, Vince Pizzinga, Mitch Allan

Finals performance
- Final result: 8th
- Final points: 64

Entry chronology
- "We Are" (2016) ►

=== Bella Paige ===
Bella Paige (born Isabella Paige Yoseski) was born on 30 October 2001 in Melbourne. She previously took part in The Voice Kids (the Australian version of the kids' edition of The Voice), and managed to qualify for the final.

Bella has a real love for all things musical and started her training at 6 years old. She has already had impressive experience in a live singing contest and performing in front of a large audience. Bella was the very first child to audition on ‘The Voice Kids Australia’ and went the whole distance to the Grand Final, finishing as the runner-up in 2014. She signed with Universal Music Australia in April 2014 and her Junior Eurovision Song Contest entry, ‘My Girls’ is her debut single.

Dance is also in her repertoire, from ballet and jazz to hip-hop. And when needed Bella can draw on her Taekwondo training too, winning gold medals in this martial arts sport at a national level.

Her family are her biggest inspirations having an older sister who is also a singer, a brother who plays football in the Youth League for Melbourne City Football Club, and an amazing stylist and number 1 supporter in her mum.

Bella’s ambition is to be an international musical recording and live performance artist, and says her biggest musical role models are Beyoncé, Rihanna, Jessie J, Christina Aguilera and Jennifer Hudson.

=== My Girls ===
My Girls is a song by Australian teen singer Bella Paige that represented Australia in the Junior Eurovision Song Contest 2015 in Sofia, Bulgaria. It is co-written by Australian superstar, Delta Goodrem, who Bella met during her experience on “The Voice Kids Australia”.

== At Junior Eurovision ==
At the running order draw which took place on 15 November 2015, Australia were drawn to perform sixth on 21 November 2015, following Netherlands and preceding Ireland.

=== Final ===
Decked out in a black top and flowing gold skirt, with a pair of backing dancers to match, Junior Eurovision's first Australian participant belted out her song. Her backdrop, in a palette of red, black, and gold, incorporates images of cascading sparks, swirling stars, fireworks, and bursts of flame.

At the end of the voting, Australia ended 8th with 64 points.

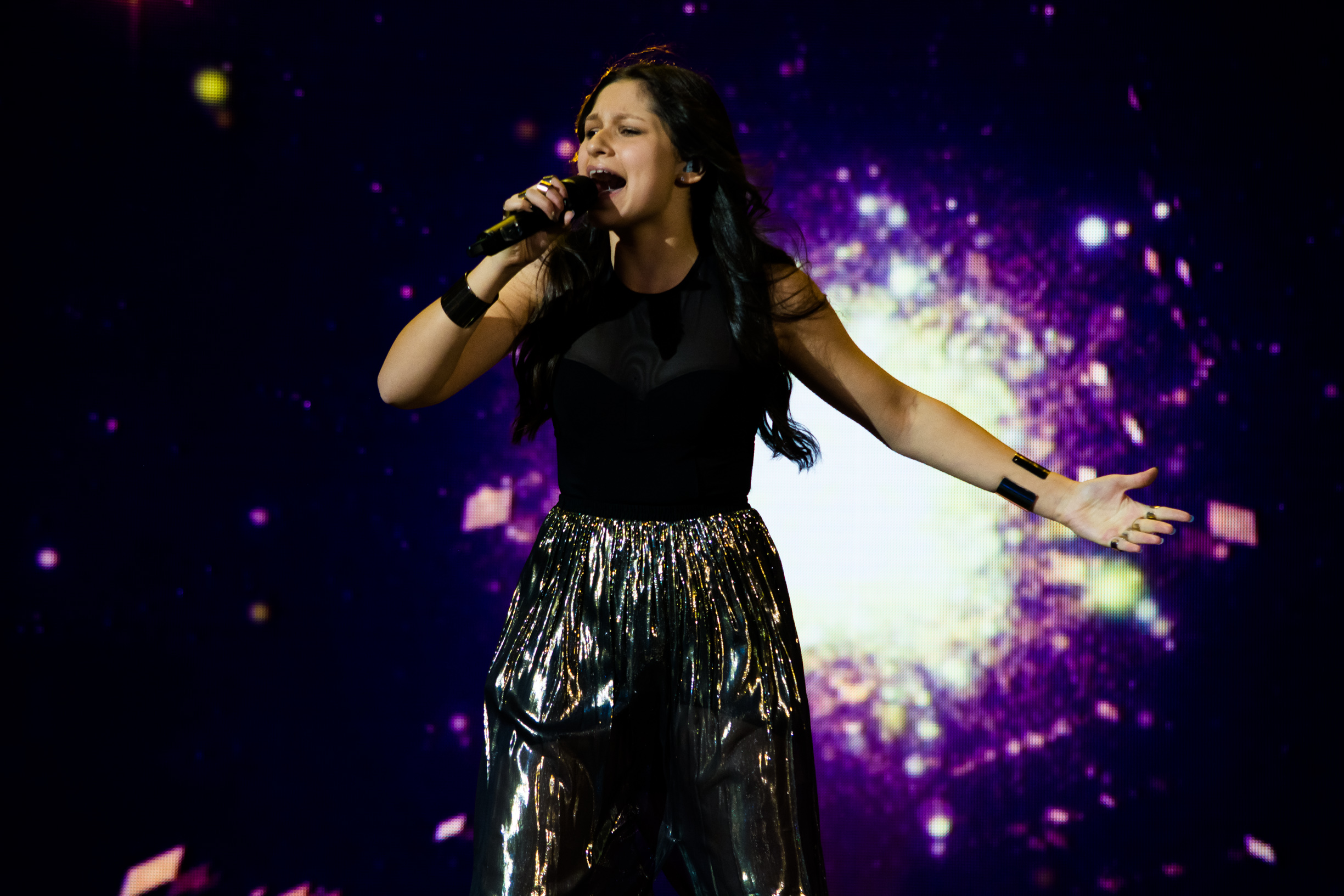
Bella Paige at stage of JESC 2015

=== Voting ===
The voting during the final consisted of 50 percent public televoting and 50 percent from a jury deliberation. The jury consisted of five music industry professionals who were citizens of the country they represent, with their names published before the contest to ensure transparency. This jury was asked to judge each contestant based on: vocal capacity; the stage performance; the song's composition and originality; and the overall impression by the act. In addition, no member of a national jury could be related in any way to any of the competing acts in such a way that they cannot vote impartially and independently. The individual rankings of each jury member were released one month after the final.

Following the release of the full split voting by the EBU after the conclusion of the competition, it was revealed that Australia had placed thirteenth with the public televote and seventh with the jury vote. In the public vote, Australia scored 32 points, while with the jury vote, Australia scored 67 points.

Below is a breakdown of points awarded to Australia and awarded by Australia in the final and the breakdown of the jury voting and televoting conducted during the final.

Points awarded to Australia
Score	Country
12 points (Note: All countries received one set of 12 points to ensure no country finished with nul points.)	
10 points	Malta
8 points	
7 points	Georgia; Kids Jury
6 points	
5 points	Albania
4 points	
3 points	Italy; Montenegro; Netherlands; Russia; San Marino
2 points	Ireland; Macedonia; Ukraine
1 point	Armenia; Belarus

Points awarded by Australia
Score	Country
12 points	Malta
10 points	Armenia
8 points	Albania
7 points	Belarus
6 points	Slovenia
5 points	Ireland
4 points	Netherlands
3 points	Ukraine
2 points	Serbia
1 point	Russia

==== Detailed voting results ====
Due to the time difference between Australia and mainland Europe, the Australian results were completely determined by the national jury, while televoting systems were not applied in this edition. The following members comprised the Australian jury:

- Richard Wilkins
- Murray Cook
- Monica Trapaga
- Natascha Cupitt
- Ben Thatcher

Detailed voting results from Australia
Draw	Country	R. Wilkins	M. Cook	M. Trapaga	N. Cupitt	B. Thatcher	Average Jury Points	Points Awarded
01	Serbia	2	3	4	5		2	2
02	Georgia	4	2	2		5		
03	Slovenia	5	6	3	8	4	6	6
04	Italy				1			
05	Netherlands		5	5	4	3	4	4
06	Australia							
07	Ireland		8	6	2	2	5	5
08	Russia	7			6	1	1	1
09	Macedonia							
10	Belarus	1	4	7	12	8	7	7
11	Armenia	10	7	10	7	7	10	10
12	Ukraine	8	1	1		6	3	3
13	Bulgaria	3						
14	San Marino							
15	Malta	12	12	12	10	12	12	12
16	Albania	6	10	8	3	10	8	8
17	Montenegro							
