= Bella Paige =

Australian singer

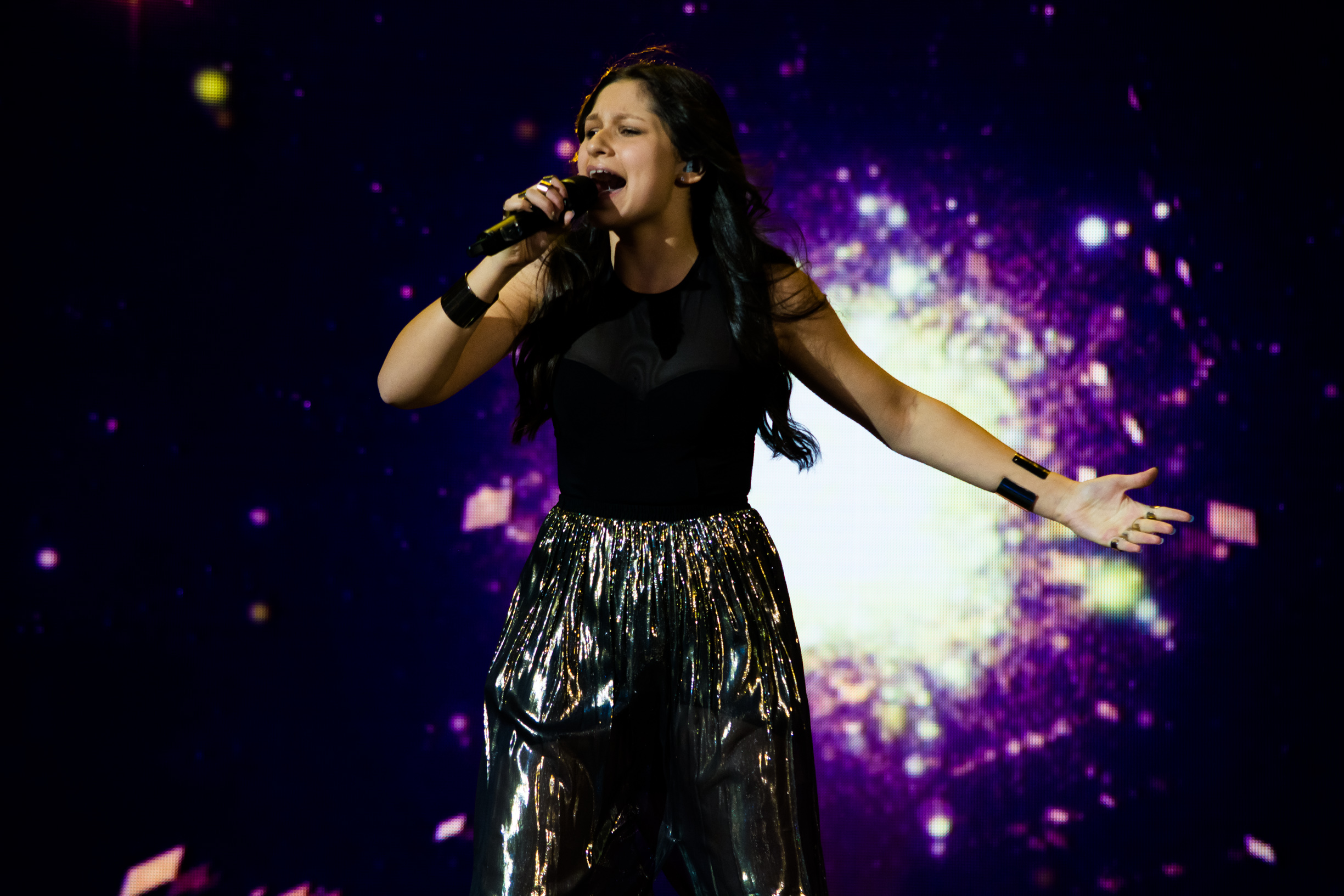
- Paige in 2015

Background information
- Born: Isabella Paige Yoseski; 30 October 2001 (age 24); Melbourne, Australia
- Genre: Pop
- Occupation: Singer
- Years active: 2014–present
- Label: UMG

Isabella Paige Yoseski (born 30 October 2001), known professionally as Bella Paige, is an Australian singer. She first began her career after reaching the finals on the 2014 edition of The Voice Kids Australia. She later represented Australia in the Junior Eurovision Song Contest 2015, placing eighth.

In 2018, Paige placed second on season seven of The Voice Australia.

== Life and career ==
Paige attended Westbourne Grammar School during her school years.

=== Karaoke contest ===
At the age of 9, she won a kid's karaoke contest hosted by Mornings, an Australian TV morning show, and judged by David Campbell and Ian "Dicko" Dickson. She walked away with tickets to see Delta Goodrem live in concert.

=== The Voice Kids Australia (2014) ===
In 2014, she was a contestant on The Voice Kids. All coaches turned, but she chose Team Madden. She managed to make it to the grand final, where she was a runner-up.

==== The Voice performances ====
Stage	Song	Original Artist	Date	Order	Result
Blind Auditions	"And I Am Telling You I'm Not Going"	Jennifer Holliday	June 22, 2014	1.1	All 3 chairs turned Joined Team Madden
Battle Rounds (Top 45)	"When You Believe" (vs. Sienna & Trinity)	Mariah Carey & Whitney Houston	July 27, 2014	7.5	Saved by Coach
Sing-off Rounds (Top 15)	"And I Am Telling You I'm Not Going"	Jennifer Holliday	August 3, 2014	8.10	Saved by Coach
Grand-Finale (Final 6)	"Let It Go"	Idina Menzel	August 10, 2014	9.4	Runner-up
Grand-Finale (Final 6)	"The Voice Within"	Christina Aguilera	August 10, 2014	9.8	Runner-up

=== Junior Eurovision ===
Paige was chosen as Australia's representative for Junior Eurovision Song Contest 2015, performing the song "My Girls", which was originally written by Delta Goodrem for her fifth studio album, but offered up as the winner's song for The Voice 2014 winner Anja Nissen, however it was later turned down by her mentor will.i.am.

=== The Voice Australia (2018) ===
At the age of 16, Bella Paige auditioned for the seventh season of The Voice Australia singing Kesha's "Praying". All four coaches, Boy George, Kelly Rowland, Delta Goodrem and Joe Jonas, turned their chairs for her. Paige chose to be part of Team Kelly.

In the Knockout rounds, Paige defeated fellow team members Somer Smith and Ricky Nifo with her rendition of "It Will Rain" by Bruno Mars, and advanced to the Battle rounds. In the Battles, she competed against Erin Whetters as the two sang "Sorry Not Sorry" by Demi Lovato. Rowland deemed Paige the winner and advanced her to the live shows.

On the first week of the live shows, Paige performed the song "Never Enough" by Loren Allred. She was saved by the public vote and advanced to the Top 12. Paige continued advancing throughout the live shows. Her performances included covers of "no tears left to cry" by Ariana Grande in the Top 12 week, "Chandelier" by Sia in the Top 11 week, and "All by Myself" by Celine Dion in the Semi-Finals week. All these performances charted in the Australian iTunes chart.

During round 1 of the Live Grand-Finale on June 17, 2018, Paige performed the song "Greatest Love of All" by Whitney Houston. She then joined her coach, Rowland, in a duet as they sang "Last Dance" by Donna Summer. She received enough votes to advance to round 2 of the Live Grand-Finale where she performed her own single "Changing". On June 17, 2018, Paige was declared the runner-up behind winner Sam Perry who was also from Team Kelly.

==== The Voice performances ====
– Performance reached the Australian iTunes chart.

Stage	Song	Original Artist	Date	Order	Result
Blind Auditions	"Praying"	Kesha	April 22, 2018	4.1	All 4 chairs turned Joined Team Kelly
Knockout Rounds (Top 48)	"It Will Rain" (vs. Somer Smith & Ricky Nifo)	Bruno Mars	May 7, 2018	12.6	Saved by Coach
Battle Rounds (Top 24)	"Sorry Not Sorry" (vs. Erin Whetters)	Demi Lovato	May 14, 2018	15.6	Saved by Coach
Live Top 13	"Never Enough"	Loren Allred	May 20, 2018	16.11	Saved by Public Vote
Live Top 12	"no tears left to cry"	Ariana Grande	May 27, 2018	17.5	Saved by Public Vote
Live Top 11	"Chandelier"	Sia	June 3, 2018	18.7	Saved by Public Vote
Live Semi-Finals (Top 9)	"All by Myself"	Eric Carmen	June 10, 2018	19.3	Saved by Public Vote
Live Grand-Finale (Final 4)	"Greatest Love of All"	George Benson	June 17, 2018	20.5	Runner-up
Live Grand-Finale (Final 4)	"Last Dance" (with Kelly Rowland)	Donna Summer	June 17, 2018	20.7	Runner-up
Live Grand-Finale (Final 4)	"Changing" (original song)	Bella Paige	June 17, 2018	N/A	Runner-up

== Discography ==
=== Singles ===
Year	Title	Peak chart positions	Album
Year	Title	AUS	Album
2015	"My Girls"	—	—N/a
2018	"Changing"	—	—N/a
"—" denotes releases that did not chart or were not released.

=== Guest appearances ===
Year	Song	Album
2014	"And I Am Telling You"	The Voice Kids 2014
2014	"Let It Go"	The Voice Kids 2014

Awards and achievements
Preceded by None	Australia in the Junior Eurovision Song Contest; 2015	Succeeded by Alexa Curtis with "We Are"
