= Armenia in the Junior Eurovision Song Contest 2015 =

- Junior Eurovision Song Contest 2015
- Country: Armenia
- Selection process: Internal Selection
- Selection date: Artist: 14 July 2015; Song: 6 October 2015

Competing entry
- Song: "Love"
- Artist: Michael Varosyan (Mika)

Placement
- Final result: 2nd, 176 points

Participation chronology

Armenia was represented at the Junior Eurovision Song Contest 2015 in Sofia, Bulgaria. On 11 June 2015 it was confirmed that they would use internal selection. Michael Varosyan (Mika) was selected as the Armenian representative on 14 July with his song "Love", being selected on 6 October.

Armenia finished 2nd with 176 points during the final.

== Before Junior Eurovision ==
=== Internal selection ===
On 11 June 2015, the Armenian public broadcaster, Public Television of Armenia (ARMTV), announced its plans to participate in the Junior Eurovision Song Contest 2015, in the Bulgarian capital, Sofia. The broadcaster had opted for an internal selection method, to decide their artist and song to represent them in November.

The broadcaster announced on 14 July, that they had selected 12-year-old Michael Varosyan to be their representative in Bulgaria. He was actually part of Compass Band, the representatives in 2012, but he was not allowed to compete since he was only 9. Varosyan has previous taken part in the national selection shows for Armenia since 2013, but never gained the ticket to represent his country at the junior contest.

On 19 September, an announcement by the public broadcaster stated that their 2015 Junior Eurovision representative, Michael Varosyan, would be performing the song "Love". It was officially presented on 6 October.

== Artist and song information ==
Michael Varosyan
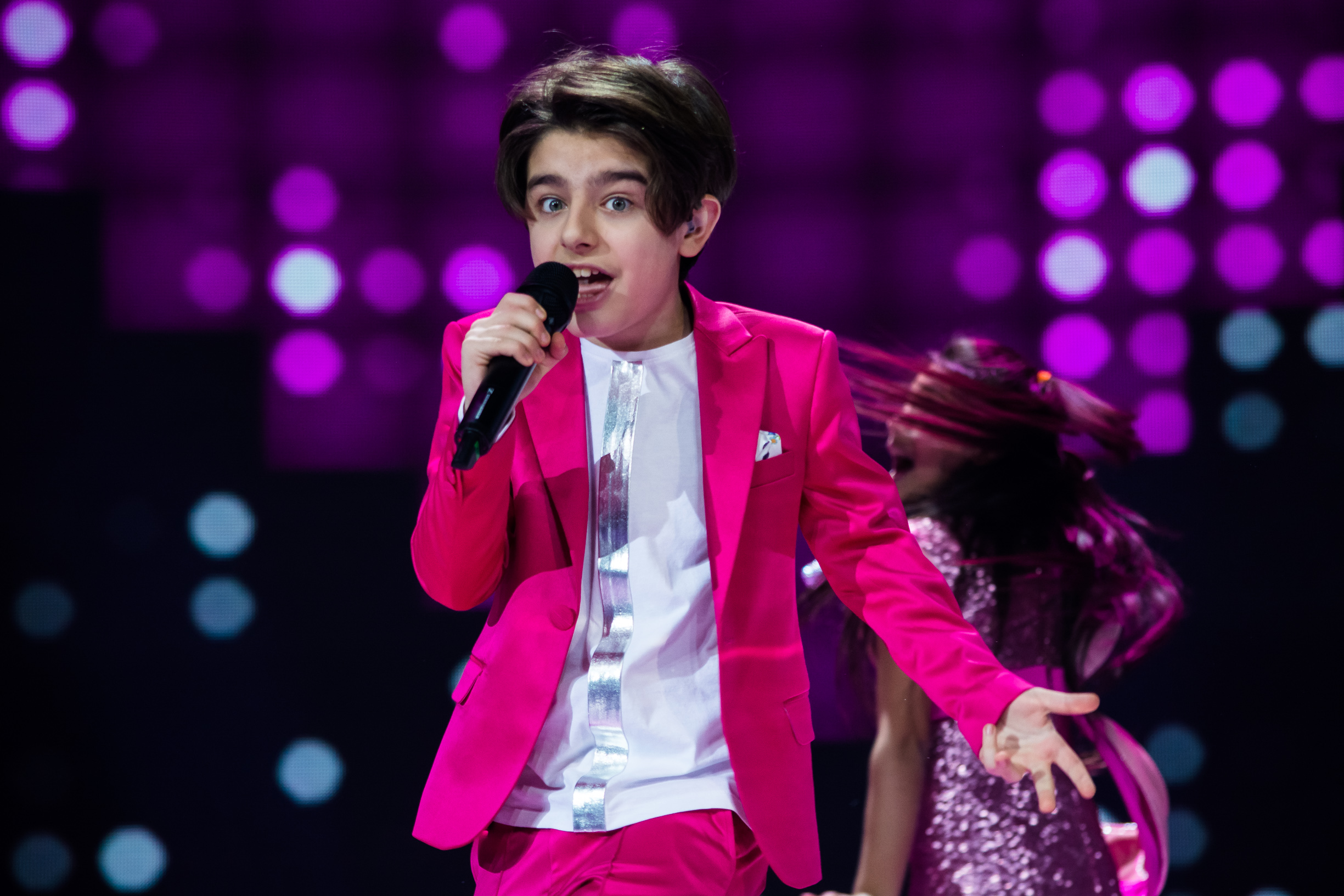
- Second placed Mika performing during the contest for Armenia.

Background information
- Also known as: Mika
- Born: Michael Varosyan; 5 July 2003 (age 22); Armenia
- Occupation: Singer
- Instrument: Vocals

(Armenia) "Love"
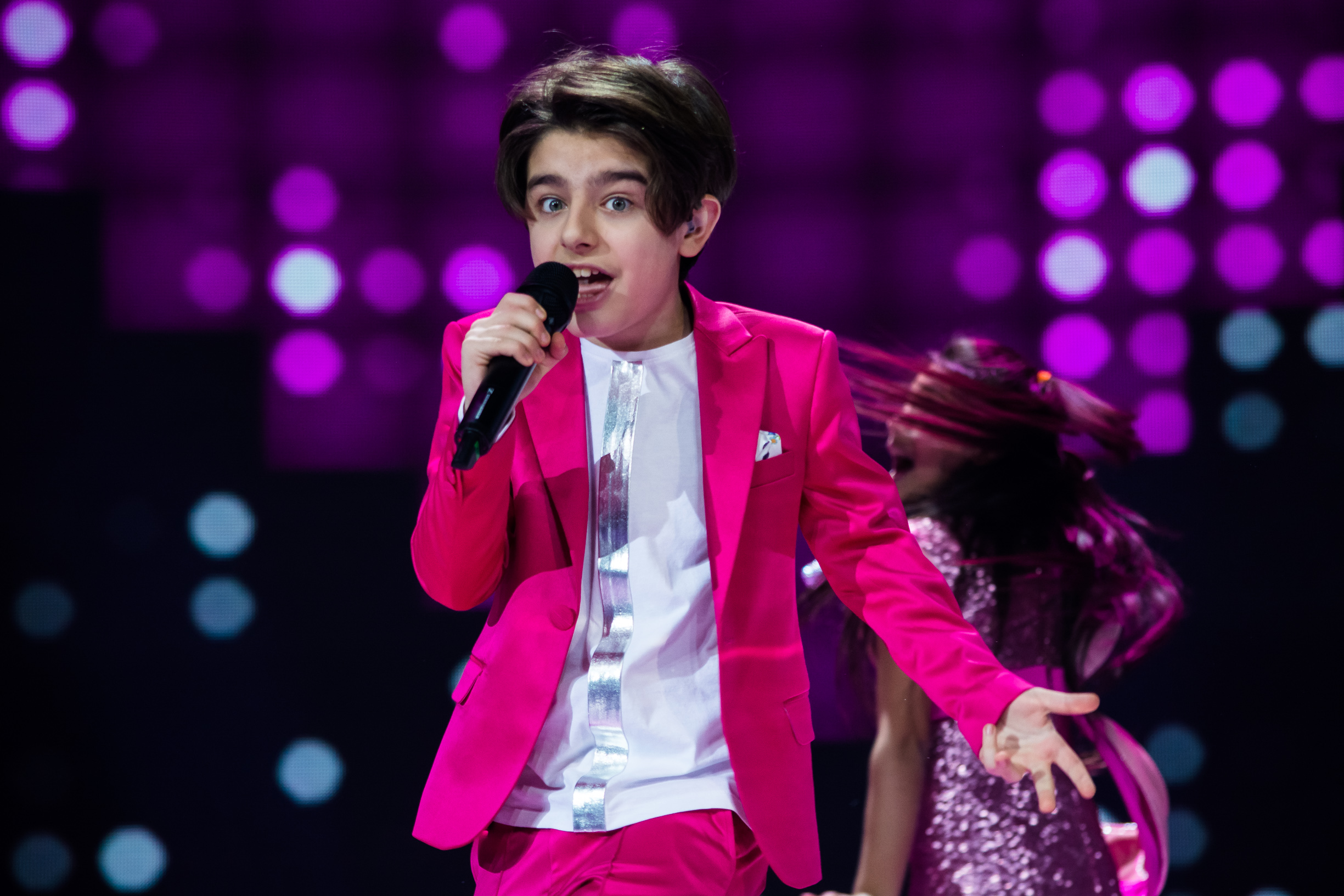

Junior Eurovision Song Contest 2015 entry
- Country: Armenia
- Artist: Michael Varosyan
- As: Mika
- Languages: Armenian, English
- Composers: Lilith Navasardyan, Michael Varosyan
- Lyricists: Avet Barseghyan, Michael Varosyan

Finals performance
- Final result: 2nd
- Final points: 176

Entry chronology
- ◄ "People of the Sun" (2014)
- "Tarber" (2016) ►

=== Michael Varosyan ===
Michael Varosyan (Armenian: Միքայել Վարոսյան), better known as simply Mika (Armenian: Միկա), is an Armenian child singer who represented Armenia at the Junior Eurovision Song Contest 2015. Mika started his music career at the age of six, after studying in the art. Varosyan has taken part in a variety of international music festivals, including the Armenian national selection competition "New wave" in 2012, and in 2013 he took part in "Golden Sparkles", a festival held in Varna.

=== Love ===
"Love" is a song by Armenian child singer Michael Varosyan, simply known as Mika. It represented Armenia at the Junior Eurovision Song Contest 2015 in Bulgaria and he achieved 2nd place with 176 points which is highest number of points for a non-winning entry.

== At Junior Eurovision ==
At the running order draw which took place on 15 November 2015, Armenia were drawn to perform eleventh on 21 November 2015, following Belarus and preceding Ukraine.

=== Final ===
Mika was wearing a pink suit and a white shirt, and his backing vocalists and dancers were also wearing pink costumes with glitter. It all started with a wide shot of the stage and the audience at the Arena Armeec, and then it approaches to the stage, where a big Earth displayed on the backdrops turns around full with pixel hearts, Mika's symbol. However, Armenia's backgrounds were very dynamic so everybody would see pink and grey colors, the word 'Love' written on the backdrop and white lights. There were also pyrotechnics at the end of the performance. At the end of the voting, Armenia placed 2nd with 176 points.

=== Voting ===
The voting during the final consisted of 50 percent public televoting and 50 percent from a jury deliberation. The jury consisted of five music industry professionals who were citizens of the country they represent, with their names published before the contest to ensure transparency. This jury was asked to judge each contestant based on: vocal capacity; the stage performance; the song's composition and originality; and the overall impression by the act. In addition, no member of a national jury could be related in any way to any of the competing acts in such a way that they cannot vote impartially and independently. The individual rankings of each jury member were released one month after the final.

Following the release of the full split voting by the EBU after the conclusion of the competition, it was revealed that Armenia had placed 2nd with the public televote and 2nd with the jury vote. In the public vote, Armenia scored 134 points, while with the jury vote, Armenia scored 149 points. Below is a breakdown of points awarded to Armenia and awarded by Armenia in the final and the breakdown of the jury voting and televoting conducted during the final.

Points awarded to Armenia
Score	Country
12 points (Note: All countries received one set of 12 points to ensure no country finished with nul points.)	Belarus; Georgia; Netherlands; Russia
10 points	Albania; Australia; Bulgaria; Kids Jury; Macedonia; San Marino; Serbia; Slovenia
8 points	Ireland; Ukraine
7 points	Malta; Montenegro
6 points	Italy
5 points	
4 points	
3 points	
2 points	
1 point	

Points awarded by Armenia
Score	Country
12 points	Malta
10 points	Slovenia
8 points	Georgia
7 points	Russia
6 points	Albania
5 points	Belarus
4 points	Serbia
3 points	Italy
2 points	San Marino
1 point	Australia

==== Detailed voting results ====
The following members comprised the Armenian jury:

- Artur Asatyan
- Inga Arshakyan
- Erik Karapetyan
- Emma Asatryan
- Alla Levonyan

Detailed voting results from Armenia
Draw	Country	A. Asatyan	I. Arshakyan	E. Krapetyan	E. Asatryan	A. Levonyan	Average Jury Points	Televoting Points	Points Awarded
01	Serbia	2	7	3	6	4	5	1	4
02	Georgia	8	12	12	12	12	12	5	8
03	Slovenia	7	8	10	10	10	10	8	10
04	Italy	12	4			7	6		3
05	Netherlands		3	2	3		2		
06	Australia	1			4			3	1
07	Ireland		2						
08	Russia	3	5	7	2	3	3	10	7
09	Macedonia								
10	Belarus	6		5	5	6	4	7	5
11	Armenia								
12	Ukraine		1	4		2		2	
13	Bulgaria	4		1	1	1	1		
14	San Marino							4	2
15	Malta	10	10	8	8	8	8	12	12
16	Albania	5	6	6	7	5	7	6	6
17	Montenegro								
