= Ukraine in the Junior Eurovision Song Contest 2015 =

- Junior Eurovision Song Contest 2015
- Country: Ukraine
- Selection process: National Final
- Selection date: 22 August 2015

Competing entry
- Song: "Pochny z sebe"
- Artist: Anna Trincher

Placement
- Final result: 11th, 38 points

Participation chronology

Ukraine was represented at the Junior Eurovision Song Contest 2015 in Sofia, Bulgaria. The Ukrainian broadcaster NTU selected their entrant through a televised national final. The semi-final took place on 25 July 2015. Fourteen acts competed in the televised final on 22 August 2015. Anna Trincher and her song "Pochny z sebe" were later declared the winners and represented Ukraine. Ukraine finished in 11th place with 38 points.

== Before Junior Eurovision ==
=== National final ===
The final took place on 22 August 2015, which saw fourteen competing acts participating in a televised production where the winner was determined by a 50/50 combination of both public telephone vote and the votes of jury members made up of music professionals. Anna Trincher was selected to represent Ukraine with the song "Pochny z sebe".

Draw	Artist	Song	Jury	Televote	Total	Place
1	Voiceland	"Dytynstvo"	4	2	6	14
2	Anastasia Tkachuk	"Moya zemlya"	5	3	8	13
3	Fresh	"Zhivy na povnu"	6	4	10	12
4	Alisa Panchuk	"Spivay"	7	7	14	11
5	Hanna Katrina	"Fly"	11	9	20	4
6	Zabava	"Lety"	7	11	18	6
7	Nina Boykova	"Rozmalyuy moyi sni"	9	10	19	5
8	Mariya Karohodska	"V sertsi muzyka ye"	10	13	23	3
9	Sofia Dobryvecher	"My khochemo myru"	12	5	17	7
10	Anna Trincher	"Pochny z sebe"	14	14	28	1
11	Sofia Yaremova	"Salsa"	8	8	16	8
12	Yarina Taras	"Povir u chudesa"	9	6	15	9
13	Nazar Stinyanskiy	"Come On"	13	1	14	10
14	Viktoriya Svyatohor	"Sylna. Vilna"	11	12	23	2

=== Controversy ===
The song "Thank God It's Friday" performed by Alina Valuyska was originally announced as one of the fifteen competing songs, however on 10 August 2015 it was announced by the broadcaster that the song had been disqualified due to plagiarism accusations that the song had copied "So Bright" by American electronic musician Pretty Lights featuring American rapper Eligh. In addition, Valuyska was not credited as contributing to the songwriting process while there is a rule that all participants must've had some part in writing their song.

== Artist and song information ==
(Ukraine) "Pochny z sebe"

Junior Eurovision Song Contest 2015 entry
- Country: Ukraine
- Artist: Anna Trincher
- Languages: Ukrainian, English
- Composers: Vadim Lisitsa, Olena Topolia, Anna Trincher
- Lyricist: Olena Topolia

Finals performance
- Final result: 11
- Final points: 38

Entry chronology
- ◄ "Pryyde vesna" (2014)

=== Anna Trincher ===
Anna Trincher (Ukrainian: Анна Трінчер; born 3 August 2001) is a Ukrainian singer. She also attempted to represent Ukraine in the Junior Eurovision Song Contest 2014 with her song "Nebo znaye" (Heaven knows), placing thirteenth. In the past, Anna has participated in a number of musical competitions and festivals, including the “Nightingale of Ukraine”, the “My Chance” online competition, the musical division of the International Turkish Olympiad, “New Wave” 2015 and the Ukrainian edition of “The Voice Kids” (mentored by singer Natalia Mogilevska).

In 2018, she took part in the eighth season of The Voice of Ukraine where she made it all the way to the finals, later securing her spot as the second runner-up.

=== Pochny z sebe ===
Pochny z sebe (English: Start with yourself) is a song by Ukrainian child singer Anna Trincher and it represented Ukraine in the Junior Eurovision Song Contest 2015 in Sofia, Bulgaria, achieving 11th place with 38 points.

== At Junior Eurovision ==
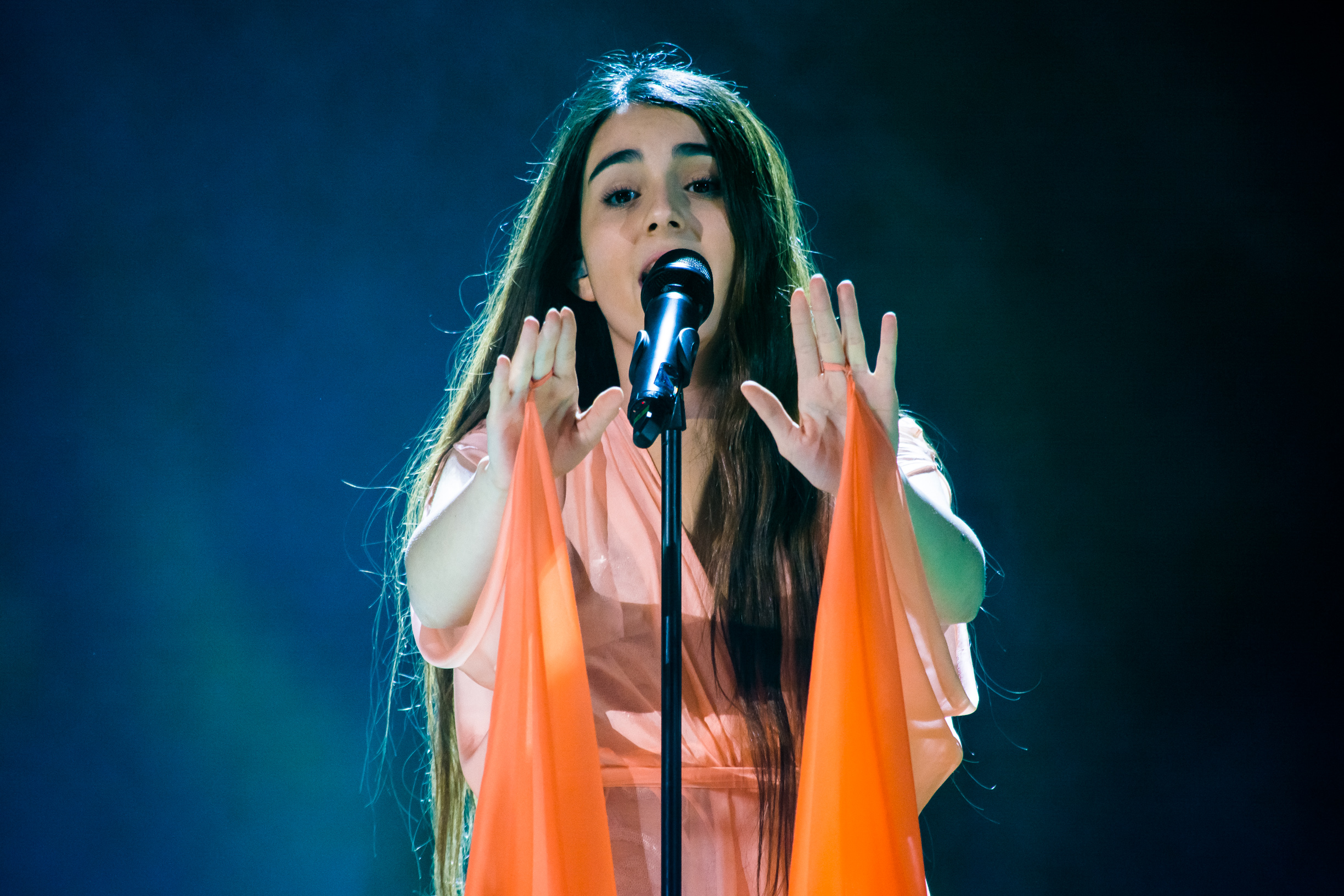
Anna Trincher at stage of JESC 2015

At the running order draw which took place on 15 November 2015, Ukraine were drawn to perform twelfth on 21 November 2015, following Armenia and preceding host country Bulgaria.

=== Final ===
Dressed in a flowy orange outfit and emerging from a glittering, metallic lotus at the beginning of her song, Anna sang "Pochny z sebe ("Start With Yourself)" with a lot of power and passion. With images of nature on the screens behind her (ranging from waterfalls and dolphins to volcanoes and flames), the intensity of the presentation seemed to rise with that of the song, until the song's close, when we zoom out on a quietly spinning Earth.

=== Voting ===
The voting during the final consisted of 50 percent public televoting and 50 percent from a jury deliberation. The jury consisted of five music industry professionals who were citizens of the country they represent, with their names published before the contest to ensure transparency. This jury was asked to judge each contestant based on: vocal capacity; the stage performance; the song's composition and originality; and the overall impression by the act. In addition, no member of a national jury could be related in any way to any of the competing acts in such a way that they cannot vote impartially and independently. The individual rankings of each jury member were released one month after the final.

Following the release of the full split voting by the EBU after the conclusion of the competition, it was revealed that Ukraine had placed twelfth with the public televote and thirteenth with the jury vote. In the public vote, Ukraine scored 35 points, while with the jury vote, Ukraine scored 19 points.

Below is a breakdown of points awarded to Ukraine and awarded by Ukraine in the final and the breakdown of the jury voting and televoting conducted during the final.

Points awarded to Ukraine
Score	Country
12 points (Note: All countries received one set of 12 points to ensure no country finished with nul points.)	
10 points	
8 points	
7 points	
6 points	Belarus
5 points	Italy
4 points	Russia
3 points	Australia; Georgia
2 points	Albania; Kids Jury
1 point	Ireland

Points awarded by Ukraine
Score	Country
12 points	San Marino
10 points	Slovenia
8 points	Armenia
7 points	Belarus
6 points	Malta
5 points	Georgia
4 points	Russia
3 points	Bulgaria
2 points	Australia
1 point	Albania

==== Detailed voting results ====
The following members comprised the Ukrainian jury:

- Natallia Miedvedieva
- Yevgeny Matyushenko
- Andrii Yakumenko (Andre France)
- Mikhail Nekrasov
- Alla Popova

Detailed voting results from Ukraine
Draw	Country	N. Miedvedieva	Y. Matyushenko	A. Yakymenko	M. Nekrasov	A. Popova	Average Jury Points	Televoting Points	Points Awarded
01	Serbia	1	5	2	2	4	3		
02	Georgia	4						10	5
03	Slovenia	8	8	6	12	10	10	6	10
04	Italy					1			
05	Netherlands		2	1	3		1		
06	Australia	5	7	8	7	5	5		2
07	Ireland							2	
08	Russia	3	1		1	2	2	4	4
09	Macedonia								
10	Belarus	7	6	10	5	6	6	8	7
11	Armenia	6	12	7	8	7	8	7	8
12	Ukraine								
13	Bulgaria	2	3	4	4	3	4	1	3
14	San Marino	10	10	12	10	12	12	12	12
15	Malta	12	4	5	6	8	7	5	6
16	Albania			3				3	1
17	Montenegro								
