= Macedonia in the Junior Eurovision Song Contest 2015 =

- Junior Eurovision Song Contest 2015
- Country: Macedonia
- Selection process: Internal selection
- Announcement date: Artist: 17 September 2015; Song 9 October 2015

Competing entry
- Song: "Pletenka - Braid of Love"
- Artist: Ivana Petkovska and Magdalena Aleksovska

Placement
- Final result: 17th (last), 26 points

Participation chronology

Macedonia was represented at the Junior Eurovision Song Contest 2015 in Sofia, Bulgaria. On 24 July 2015, it was confirmed that they would return to the contest after a one-year absence. The national broadcaster Macedonian Radio Television (MRT) held auditions at their studios in September 2015. Ivana Petkovska & Magdalena Aleksovska represented Macedonia with the song "Pletenka - Braid of Love". Unfortunately, the country ended in 17th place (last) with 26 points.

== Before Junior Eurovision ==
It was announced on 24 July 2015, by the national broadcaster MRT, that Macedonia would be returning to the Junior Eurovision Song Contest, after last taking part at the Junior Eurovision Song Contest 2013. MRT held auditions at their broadcasting studios in September 2015, after making an invitation for submissions of participants and songs. On 17 September 2015, MRT announced that they had internally selected Ivana Petkovska and Magdalena Aleksovska to represent Macedonia at the Junior Eurovision Song Contest 2015, to be held in neighbouring Bulgaria.

== Artist and song information ==
(North Macedonia) "Pletenka - Braid of Love"
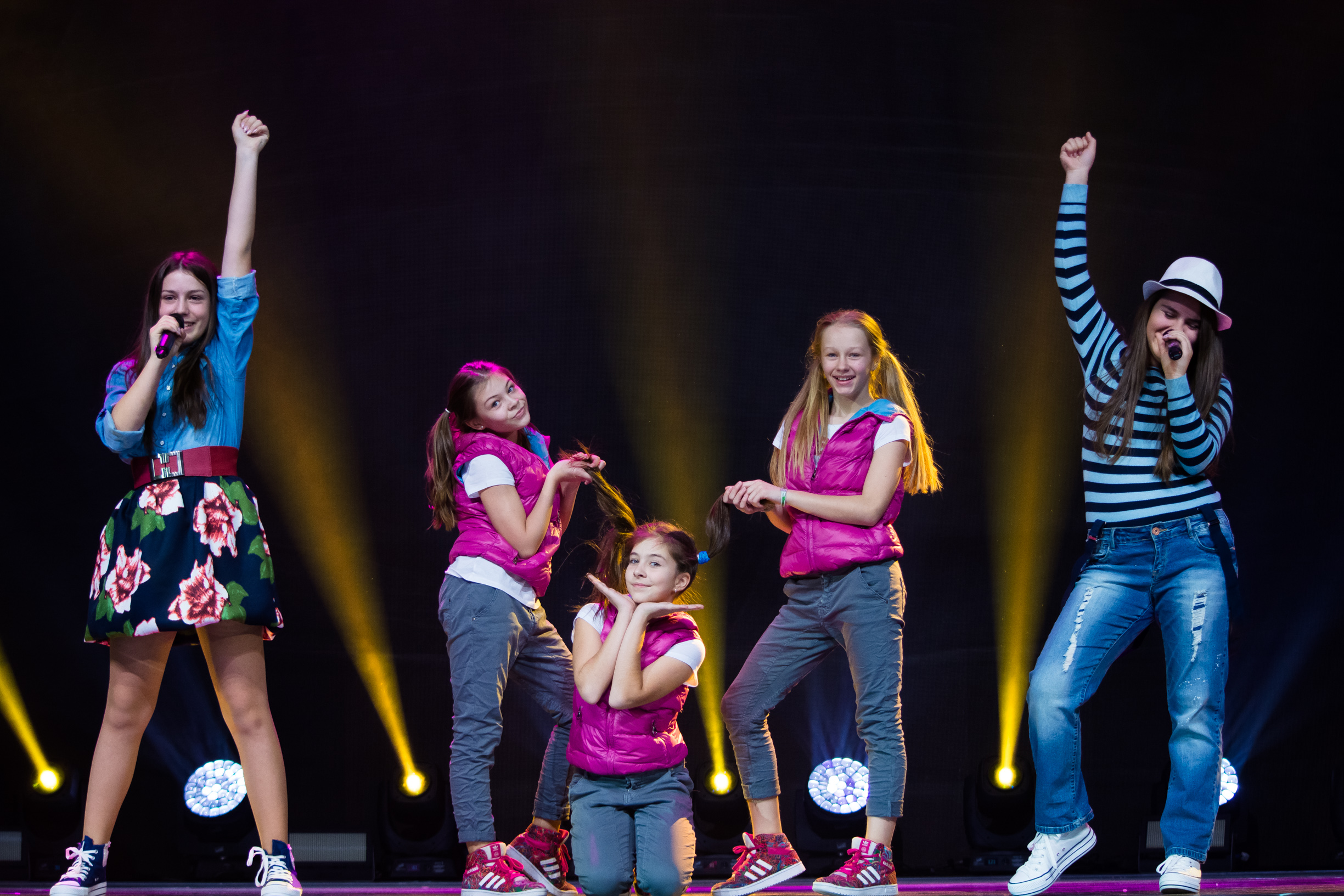

Junior Eurovision Song Contest 2015 entry
- Country: Macedonia
- Artist(s): Ivana Petkovska and Magdalena Aleksovska
- Languages: Macedonian, English
- Composer(s): Magdalena Aleksovska
- Lyricist(s): Ivana Petkovska

Entry chronology
- ◄ "Ohrid i muzika" (2013)

=== Ivana and Magdalena ===
Ivana Petkovska and Magdalena Aleksovska who were both 13 at the time of the contest, come from the Macedonian capital, Skopje.

Ivana Petkovska (Macedonian: Ивана Петковска) was born on 14 April 2002 in Skopje, Macedonia. She is an 8th grade pupil at the primary school Dimitar Makedonski. She made her first steps in music when she was only 5, performing at the Potochinja children's festival. After three years she joined KUD Nikola Jonkov Vapcarov, a Macedonian national folklore ensemble, taking part in several performances in the country and abroad. In addition to dancing, she has also sung Macedonian folk songs at a large number of concerts throughout Macedonia. Ivana is also a member of her school choir.

Magdalena Aleksovska (Macedonian: Магдалена Алексовска) was born on 24 January 2002 in Skopje, Macedonia. She is a 9th grade primary school pupil. She is a sixth grade student in the State Music Ballet Centre, Skopje. Magdalena was a member of the Zlatno Slavejche (Golden Nightingale) children's festival choir from 2009 to 2014. She also plays flute and recorded her first song, Pupil in 2010. She has performed at several international children's festivals (including Istanbul and Belgrade), as well as national and international competitions (including Struga and Prilep, Macedonia). Magdalena's most significant performance was at the Slavyanskiy Bazar 2013 international children's festival in Vitebsk, Belarus.

=== Pletenka - Braid of Love ===
Pletenka - Braid of Love (English: Braid) is a song by Macedonian child singers Ivana Petkovska and Magdalena Aleksovska. It represented Macedonia in the Junior Eurovision Song Contest 2015 in Sofia, Bulgaria.

== At Junior Eurovision ==
At the running order draw which took place on 15 November 2015, Macedonia were drawn to perform ninth on 21 November 2015, following Russia and preceding Belarus.

The final was broadcast in Macedonia on MRT 1 with commentary by Tina Tautovic and Spasija Veljanoska. The Macedonian spokesperson, who announced the Macedonian votes during the final, was Aleksandrija Čaliovski.

=== Final ===
Ivana and Magdalena started their performance in the center of the stage, together with their three dancers, making a circle. The camera focused on their feet, right before the song started and the dancers started to move. Magdalena was wearing trousers and a hat and Ivana was wearing a black dress with flowers. The dancers were wearing pink vests. All 5 girls were wearing braids (like the title of the song, 'Pletenka').

At the end of the voting, Macedonia placed 17th (last) with 26 points.

=== Voting ===
The voting during the final consisted of 50 percent public televoting and 50 percent from a jury deliberation. The jury consisted of five music industry professionals who were citizens of the country they represent, with their names published before the contest to ensure transparency. This jury was asked to judge each contestant based on: vocal capacity; the stage performance; the song's composition and originality; and the overall impression by the act. In addition, no member of a national jury could be related in any way to any of the competing acts in such a way that they cannot vote impartially and independently. The individual rankings of each jury member were released one month after the final.

Following the release of the full split voting by the EBU after the conclusion of the competition, it was revealed that Macedonia had placed 15th with the public televote and 17th (last) with the jury vote. In the public vote, Macedonia scored 22 points, while with the jury vote, Macedonia scored 12 points.

Below is a breakdown of points awarded to Macedonia and awarded by Macedonia in the final and the breakdown of the jury voting and televoting conducted during the final.

Points awarded to Macedonia
Score	Country
12 points (Note: All countries received one set of 12 points to ensure no country finished with nul points.)	
10 points	
8 points	
7 points	Albania
6 points	
5 points	Montenegro
4 points	
3 points	
2 points	
1 point	Bulgaria; Serbia

Points awarded by Macedonia
Score	Country
12 points	Serbia
10 points	Armenia
8 points	Montenegro
7 points	Albania
6 points	Bulgaria
5 points	Malta
4 points	Belarus
3 points	Russia
2 points	Australia
1 point	Slovenia

==== Detailed voting results ====
The following members comprised the Macedonian jury:

- Božidar Noev
- Boban Mirkovski
- Ksenija Nikolova
- Trajče Organdjijev
- Maja Vukićević

Detailed voting results from Macedonia
Draw	Country	B. Noev	B. Mirkovski	K. Nikolova	T. Organdjijev	M. Vukićević	Average Jury Points	Televoting Points	Points Awarded
01	Serbia	12	12	12	7	10	12	10	12
02	Georgia	5				1			
03	Slovenia	1	5		1	2	1	5	1
04	Italy		7		10		3		
05	Netherlands			4	5				
06	Australia			2				6	2
07	Ireland		3		12	7	5		
08	Russia	10	2	10	3	5	7		3
09	Macedonia								
10	Belarus	7	4	7	6	12	8		4
11	Armenia	6	10	6	2	4	6	12	10
12	Ukraine			1				1	
13	Bulgaria	3		5				8	6
14	San Marino		1					3	
15	Malta	4		3	4	6	4	4	5
16	Albania	2	6			3	2	7	7
17	Montenegro	8	8	8	8	8	10	2	8
