= Serbia in the Junior Eurovision Song Contest 2015 =

- Junior Eurovision Song Contest 2015
- Country: Serbia
- Selection process: Internal selection
- Announcement date: 21 September 2015

Competing entry
- Song: "Lenina pesma"
- Artist: Lena Stamenković

Placement
- Final result: 7th, 79 points

Participation chronology

Serbia was represented at the Junior Eurovision Song Contest 2015 in Sofia, Bulgaria. On 20 August 2015, their participation in the 2015 contest was confirmed. Lena Stamenković was later selected to represent Serbia with the song "Lenina pesma".

Serbia finished 7th with 79 points during the final.

== Internal selection ==
On 21 September 2015, it was revealed that Lena Stamenković would represent Serbia with the song "Lenina pesma". She was selected internally by the Serbian broadcaster RTS.

== Artist information and song ==
(Serbia) "Lenina pesma"

Junior Eurovision Song Contest 2015 entry
- Country: Serbia
- Artist: Lena Stamenković
- Languages: Serbian
- Composers: Leontina Vukomanović, Dušan Alagić, Lena Stamenković
- Lyricists: Leontina Vukomanović, Lena Stamenković

Entry chronology
- ◄ "Svet u mojim očima" (2014)

=== Lena Stamenković ===
Lena Stamenković was born on June 1, 2004, in the city of Zaječar, not far from Serbia’s border with Bulgaria.

=== Lenina pesma ===
“Lenina pesma”, which simply means “Lena’s Song”, is a song by Serbian child singer Lena Stamenković and it represented Serbia in the Junior Eurovision Song Contest 2015 in Bulgaria. It was written by Lena alongside Leontina Vukomanović, who co-wrote “Beauty Never Lies” for Serbia’s 2015 Eurovision representative, Bojana Stamenov, as well as “Lane moje” for Željko Joksimović. The arrangement was coordinated by Dušan Alagić.

== At Junior Eurovision ==
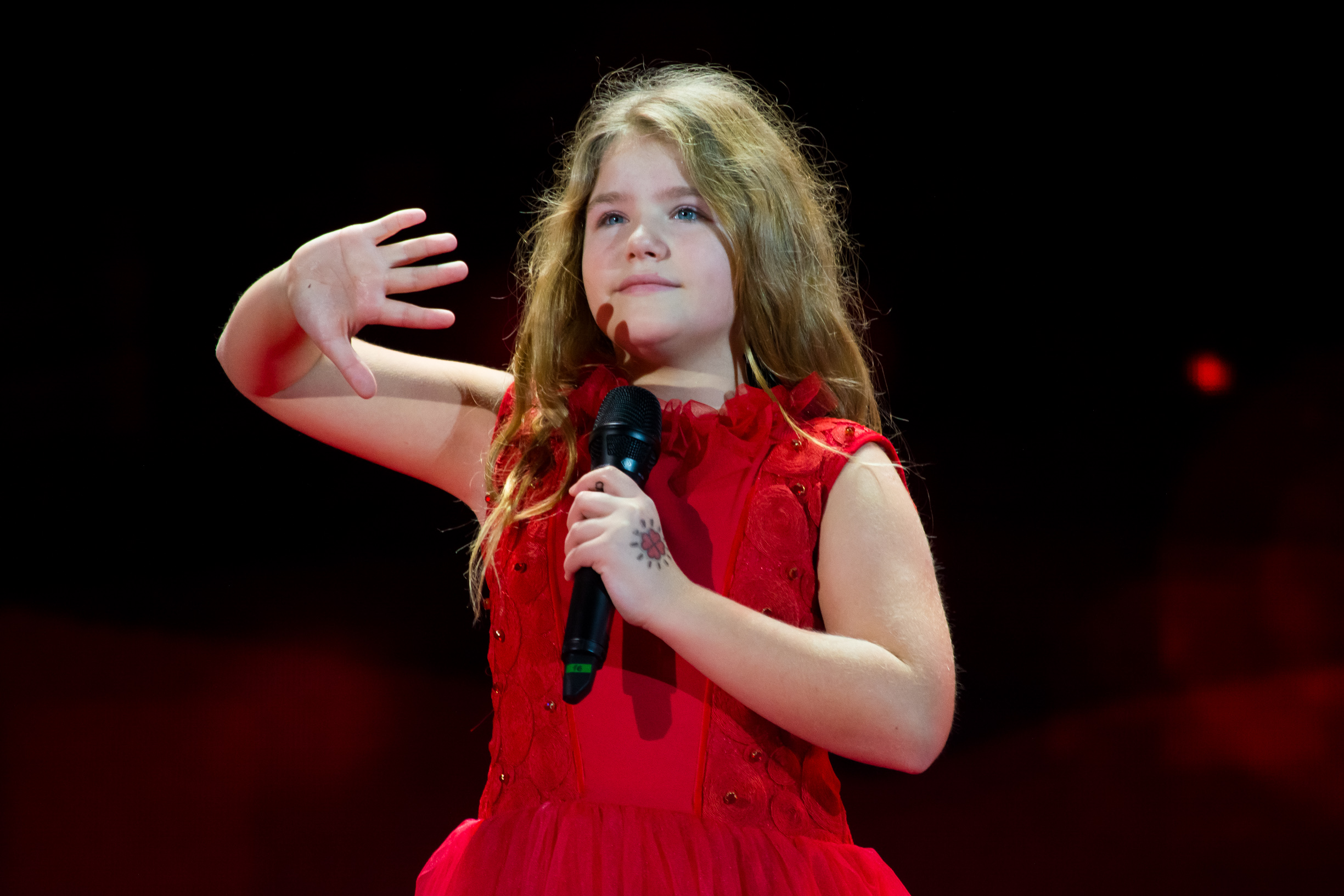
Lena Stamenkovic at stage of JESC 2015

At the running order draw which took place on 15 November 2015, Serbia were drawn to open the show on 21 November 2015, preceding Georgia.

=== Final ===
The song begins with Lena staring intensely down the camera as she describes the world we live in, with spotlights on her as the stage lights up in red and blue. A red puff of some from the back wall brings in the chorus, and as the song draws its close the back lights change to warmer red and yellow colours.

Lena performed the song with light fog around her on the floor of the stage, and a wind machine adding to the drama as the fog moved around the performance area.

At the end of the voting, Serbia placed 7th with 79 points.

=== Voting ===
The voting during the final consisted of 50 percent public televoting and 50 percent from a jury deliberation. The jury consisted of five music industry professionals who were citizens of the country they represent, with their names published before the contest to ensure transparency. This jury was asked to judge each contestant based on: vocal capacity; the stage performance; the song's composition and originality; and the overall impression by the act. In addition, no member of a national jury could be related in any way to any of the competing acts in such a way that they cannot vote impartially and independently. The individual rankings of each jury member were released one month after the final.

Following the release of the full split voting by the EBU after the conclusion of the competition, it was revealed that Serbia had placed 8th with the public televote and 5th with the jury vote. In the public vote, Serbia scored 53 points, while with the jury vote, Serbia scored 73 points.

Below is a breakdown of points awarded to Serbia and awarded by Serbia in the final and the breakdown of the jury voting and televoting conducted during the final.

Points awarded to Serbia
Score	Country
12 points (Note: All countries received one set of 12 points to ensure no country finished with nul points.)	Macedonia; Montenegro
10 points	
8 points	
7 points	Slovenia
6 points	
5 points	Bulgaria; Russia; San Marino
4 points	Armenia; Belarus; Kids Jury; Netherlands
3 points	Ireland
2 points	Australia
1 point	

Points awarded by Serbia
Score	Country
12 points	Malta
10 points	Armenia
8 points	Montenegro
7 points	Russia
6 points	Slovenia
5 points	Belarus
4 points	Albania
3 points	Georgia
2 points	Italy
1 point	Macedonia

==== Detailed voting results ====
The following members comprised the Serbian jury:

- Ana Stanić
- Aleksandar Ilić (Sanja Ilić)
- Marija Marić Marković (Mari Mari)
- Lena Kovačević
- Ivona Menzalin

Detailed voting results from Serbia
Draw	Country	A. Stanić	S. Ilić	Mari Mari	L. Kovačević	I. Menzalin	Average Jury Points	Televoting Points	Points Awarded
01	Serbia								
02	Georgia	3	7	10	10	5	7		3
03	Slovenia	1			2	2	1	7	6
04	Italy	4	6	7	7	7	6		2
05	Netherlands		3	2	4	3	2		
06	Australia	7		6	5	6	5		
07	Ireland		2					2	
08	Russia	5	4	1	3		3	8	7
09	Macedonia							5	1
10	Belarus	8	10	8	6	8	8		5
11	Armenia	12	12	12	12	12	12	6	10
12	Ukraine	2							
13	Bulgaria		1			1		4	
14	San Marino							1	
15	Malta	10	8	5	8	10	10	10	12
16	Albania	6	5	4	1	4	4	3	4
17	Montenegro			3				12	8
