= Georgia in the Junior Eurovision Song Contest 2015 =

- Junior Eurovision Song Contest 2015
- Country: Georgia
- Selection process: Internal selection
- Announcement date: Artist: 25 September 2015; Song: 8 October 2015

Competing entry
- Song: "Gabede"
- Artist: The Virus

Placement
- Final result: 10th, 51 points

Participation chronology

Georgia selected their Junior Eurovision Song Contest 2015 entry through an internal selection like they've done in previous years. On 25 September 2015 it was revealed that group The Virus will represent Georgia in the contest with the song "Gabede". Georgia ended in tenth place with 51 points.

== Internal selection ==
Georgian broadcaster GPB decided to internally select their 2015 artist after holding an open audition. It was originally announced on 5 August 2015 that Liza, Elen, Tako and Data will represent Georgia, however on 25 September 2015 it was revealed that they would perform as a group The Virus.

== Artist and song information ==
(Georgia (country)) "Gabede" (გაბედე)

Junior Eurovision Song Contest 2015 entry
- Country: Georgia
- Artists: Elen Kezhrishvili; Tako Gagnidze; Lizi Tavberidze; Data Pavliashvili
- As: The Virus
- Languages: Georgian
- Composer: Giga Kukhianidze
- Lyricist: Erekle Deisadze

Finals performance
- Final result: 10th
- Final points: 51

Entry chronology
- ◄ "Happy Day" (2014)
- "Mzeo" (2016) ►

=== The Virus ===
The Virus is a Georgian pop group, consisting of singers: Elee Kay (Elene Kezhrishvili), Tako Gagnidze, Lizi Tavberidze and Data Pavliashvili. They are notable for having represented Georgia in the Junior Eurovision Song Contest 2015, placing tenth out of seventeen entries.

=== Gabede ===
"Gabede" (English: Dare) is a song by the Georgian pop group "The Virus" and it will represent Georgia in the Junior Eurovision Song Contest 2015 in Bulgaria.

== At Junior Eurovision ==
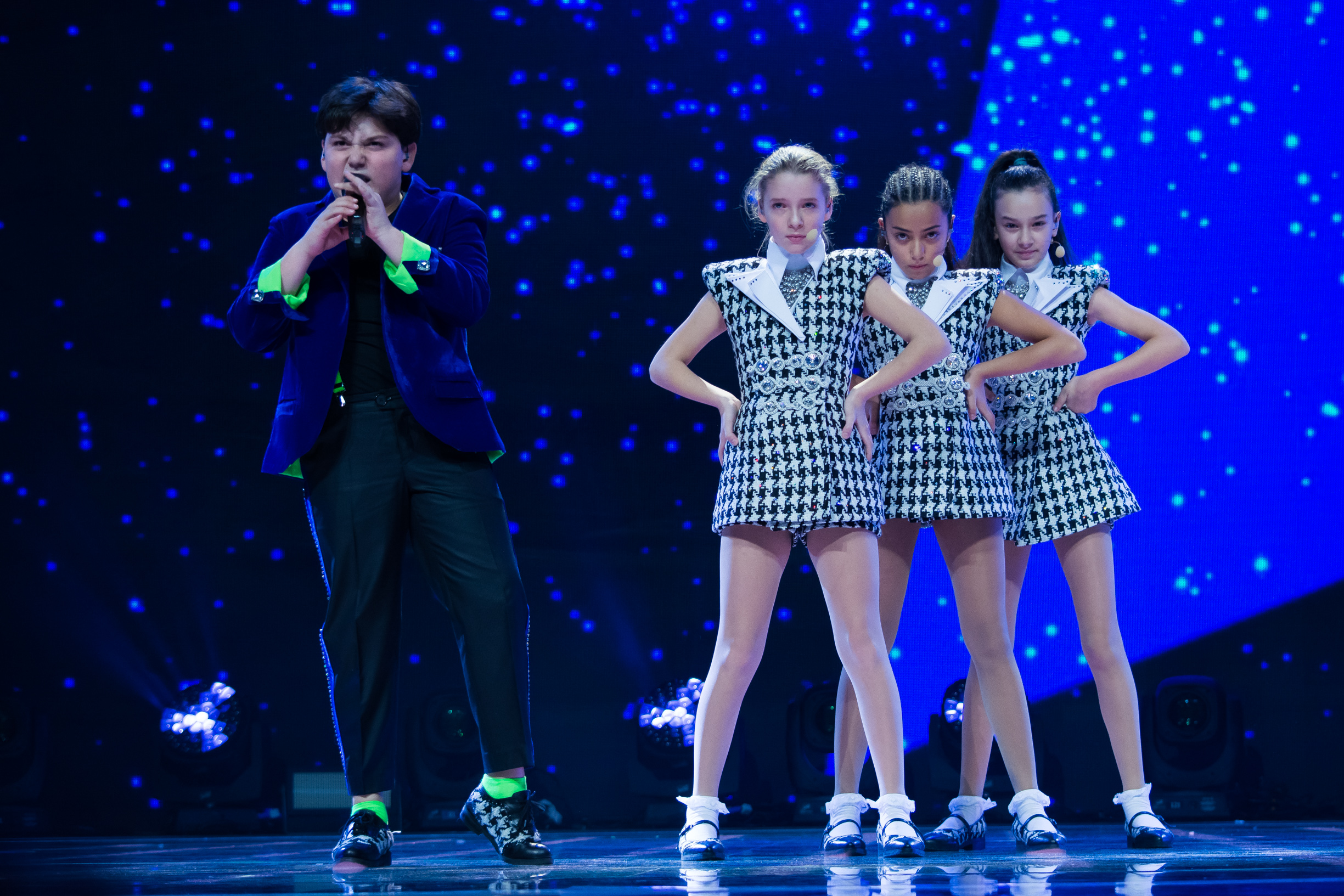
The Virus at stage of JESC 2015

At the running order draw which took place on 15 November 2015, Georgia were drawn to perform second on 21 November 2015, following Serbia preceding Slovenia.

The final was broadcast in Georgia on GPB 1TV with commentary by Tuta Chkheidze. The Georgian spokesperson, who announced the Georgian votes during the final, was Lizi Pop (the representative for Georgia in the Junior Eurovision Song Contest 2014).

=== Final ===
Elen, Lizi, Data and Tako lined up as they appeared on stage and looked to the audience during their opening shot. The background was black with blue lines, stars and triangles.

At the end of the voting, Georgia placed 10th with 51 points.

=== Voting ===
The voting during the final consisted of 50 percent public televoting and 50 percent from a jury deliberation. The jury consisted of five music industry professionals who were citizens of the country they represent, with their names published before the contest to ensure transparency. This jury was asked to judge each contestant based on: vocal capacity; the stage performance; the song's composition and originality; and the overall impression by the act. In addition, no member of a national jury could be related in any way to any of the competing acts in such a way that they cannot vote impartially and independently. The individual rankings of each jury member were released one month after the final.

Following the release of the full split voting by the EBU after the conclusion of the competition, it was revealed that Georgia had placed 11th with the public televote and 11th with the jury vote. In the public vote, Georgia scored 41 points, while with the jury vote, Georgia scored 40 points.

Below is a breakdown of points awarded to Georgia and awarded by Georgia in the final and the breakdown of the jury voting and televoting conducted during the final.

Points awarded to Georgia
Score	Country
12 points (Note: All countries received one set of 12 points to ensure no country finished with nul points.)	
10 points	
8 points	Albania; Armenia
7 points	
6 points	
5 points	Belarus; Ukraine
4 points	Ireland; Montenegro
3 points	Serbia
2 points	
1 point	Malta; Russia

Points awarded by Georgia
Score	Country
12 points	Armenia
10 points	Malta
8 points	Belarus
7 points	Australia
6 points	Netherlands
5 points	Slovenia
4 points	Albania
3 points	Ukraine
2 points	Ireland
1 point	Bulgaria

==== Detailed voting results ====
The following members comprised the Georgian jury:

- Nato Dumbadze
- Natalia Xarashvili
- Maka Davitaia
- Oto Nemsadze
- Goga Meskhi

Detailed voting results from Georgia
Draw	Country	N. Dumbadze	N. Xarashvili	M. Davitaia	O. Nemsadze	G. Meskhi	Average Jury Points	Televoting Points	Points Awarded
01	Serbia	3	6	1	6		3	1	
02	Georgia								
03	Slovenia		5	3	4			7	5
04	Italy	7	8			4	4		
05	Netherlands	12	2	7	8	10	8		6
06	Australia		12		7	5	6	2	7
07	Ireland	2	4	5	3	7	5		2
08	Russia	4							
09	Macedonia		3						
10	Belarus	6	7	6	5	8	7	8	8
11	Armenia	10	1	8	10	12	12	12	12
12	Ukraine			12		2	2	5	3
13	Bulgaria	5			2			4	1
14	San Marino	1		2				3	
15	Malta	8	10	4	12	6	10	10	10
16	Albania			10	1	1	1	6	4
17	Montenegro					3			
