= San Marino in the Junior Eurovision Song Contest 2015 =

- Junior Eurovision Song Contest 2015
- Country: San Marino
- Selection process: Internal Selection
- Selection date: 29 October 2015

Competing entry
- Song: "Mirror"
- Artist: Kamilla Ismailova

Placement
- Final result: 14th, 36 points

Participation chronology

San Marino participated in the Junior Eurovision Song Contest 2015 in Sofia, Bulgaria. On 27 September 2015 it was confirmed that they would participate in the 2015 contest. The country used an internal selection to select the artist and the song. Kamilla Ismailova represented San Marino with the song "Mirror".

== Before Junior Eurovision ==
On 29 October 2015, San Marino chose their artist for the contest through an internal selection. Kamilla Ismailova was selected to represent the country, despite being born and raised in Russia.

== Artist and song information ==
(San Marino) "Mirror"

Junior Eurovision Song Contest 2015 entry
- Country: San Marino
- Artist: Kamilla Ismailova
- Languages: Italian, English
- Composers: Andrelli, Josefin Glenmark
- Lyricists: Andrelli, Josefin Glenmark, Piero Romitelli, Kamilla Ismailova

Finals performance
- Final result: 14th
- Final points: 36

Entry chronology
- ◄ "Breaking My Heart" (2014)
- "Come noi" (2024) ►

=== Kamilla Ismailova ===
Kamilla Ismailova was born in Russia on July 22, 2004. She is half-Azerbaijani. She represented San Marino in Junior Eurovision 2015, even though the rules of Junior Eurovision say that representatives of countries must have citizenship or have lived in the country for at least two years.

Aside from Junior Eurovision, Kamilla and her friends from the "S. T. A. R. S" Academy of cinema and show-business host a music chart called "Kids' Top 10 with Yana Rudkovskaya", and also present a fashion/music program called "TrYnd-Fashion".

Kamilla made an appearance in the official video of "A Million Voices" by Polina Gagarina, whom represented Russia in Eurovision Song Contest 2015.

=== Mirror ===
"Mirror" is a song by Russian-Azerbaijani child singer Kamilla Ismailova. It represented San Marino at the Junior Eurovision Song Contest 2015 in Bulgaria, ending 14th out of 17 songs with 36 points.

== At Junior Eurovision ==
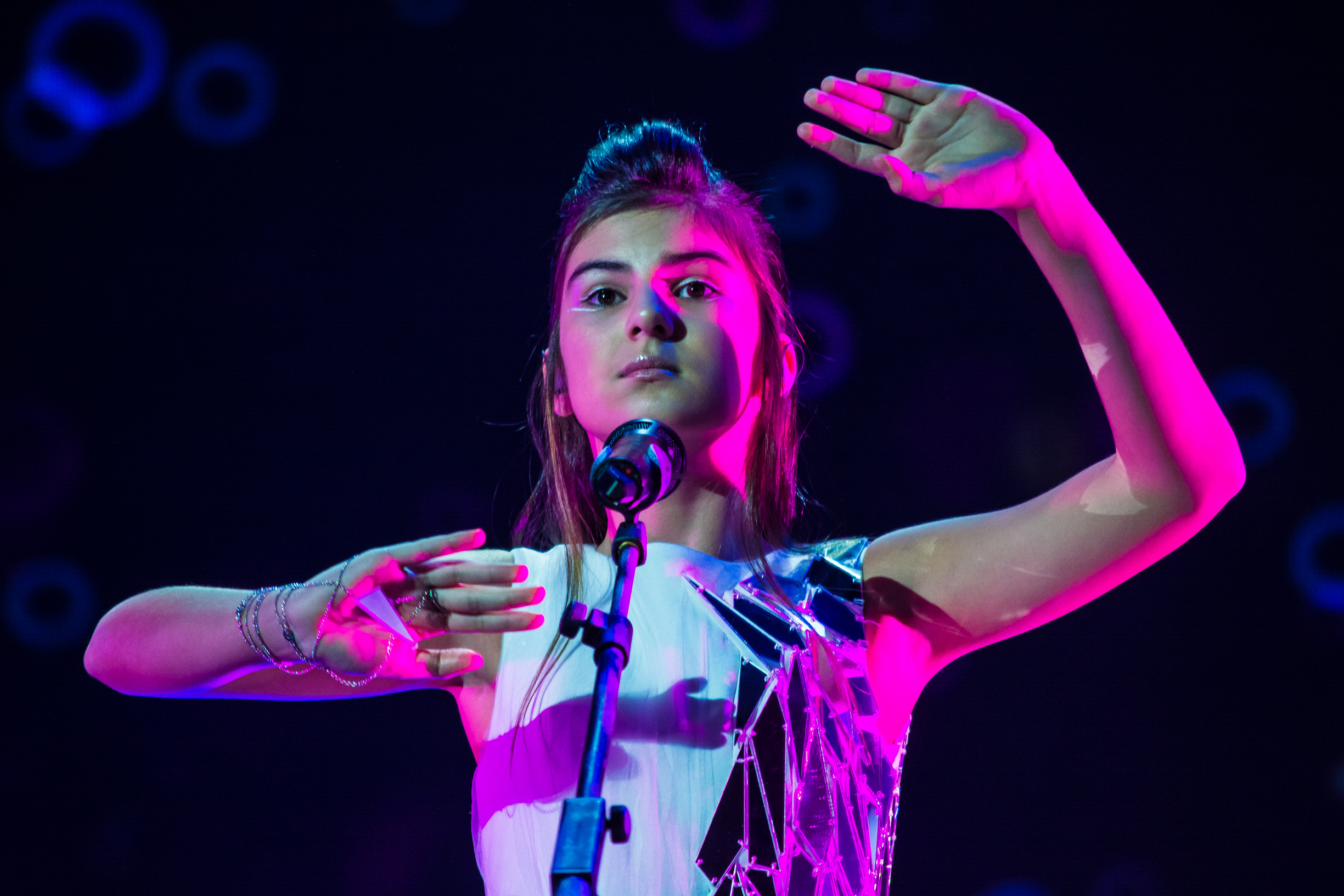
Kamilla Ismailova at the stage of JESC 2015

At the running order draw which took place on 15 November 2015, San Marino were drawn to perform fourteenth on 21 November 2015, following host country Bulgaria and preceding Malta.

=== Final ===
San Marino's representative was wearing a very iridescent makeup and a long white dress, with half of it encrusted in mirrors. She was joined on stage by 4 dancers dressed in silver, in a dark background with white lighting.

=== Voting ===
The voting during the final consisted of 50 percent public televoting and 50 percent from a jury deliberation. The jury consisted of five music industry professionals who were citizens of the country they represent, with their names published before the contest to ensure transparency. This jury was asked to judge each contestant based on: vocal capacity; the stage performance; the song's composition and originality; and the overall impression by the act. In addition, no member of a national jury could be related in any way to any of the competing acts in such a way that they cannot vote impartially and independently. The individual rankings of each jury member were released one month after the final.

Following the release of the full split voting by the EBU after the conclusion of the competition, it was revealed that San Marino had placed ninth with the public televote and fifteenth with the jury vote. In the public vote, San Marino scored 51 points, while with the jury vote, San Marino scored 15 points.

Below is a breakdown of points awarded to San Marino and awarded by San Marino in the final and the breakdown of the jury voting and televoting conducted during the final.

Points awarded to San Marino
Score	Country
12 points (Note: All countries received one set of 12 points to ensure no country finished with nul points.)	Ukraine
10 points	
8 points	
7 points	Russia
6 points	
5 points	
4 points	
3 points	Belarus
2 points	Armenia
1 point	

Points awarded by San Marino
Score	Country
12 points	Malta
10 points	Armenia
8 points	Russia
7 points	Belarus
6 points	Slovenia
5 points	Serbia
4 points	Albania
3 points	Australia
2 points	Netherlands
1 point	Ireland

==== Detailed voting results ====
The Sammarinese votes in this final were based on 100% jury. The following members comprised the Sammarinese jury:

- Viola Conti
- Nicola Della Valle
- Barbara Andreini
- Francesco Stefanelli
- Matteo Venturini

Detailed voting results from San Marino
Draw	Country	V. Conti	N. Della Valle	B. Andreini	F. Stefanelli	M. Venturini	Points Awarded
01	Serbia	4	2	6	4	4	5
02	Georgia	8		3			
03	Slovenia		8	7	6		6
04	Italy					3	
05	Netherlands	2	5	1	2	2	2
06	Australia	6	1	2	1	6	3
07	Ireland	7	4			1	1
08	Russia		7	10	12	7	8
09	Macedonia						
10	Belarus	3	3	5	7	5	7
11	Armenia	12	10	8	8	10	10
12	Ukraine	5			5		
13	Bulgaria				3		
14	San Marino						
15	Malta	10	12	12	10	12	12
16	Albania	1	6	4		8	4
17	Montenegro						
