= Russia in the Junior Eurovision Song Contest 2015 =

- Junior Eurovision Song Contest 2015
- Country: Russia
- Selection process: National final
- Selection date: 25 September 2015

Competing entry
- Song: "Mechta (Dream)"
- Artist: Mikhail Smirnov

Placement
- Final result: 6th, 80 points

Participation chronology

Russia was represented at the Junior Eurovision Song Contest 2015 which took place on 21 November 2015, in Sofia, Bulgaria. The Russian broadcaster, Russia-1, selected their entry through a televised national final. Mikhail Smirnov won it and represented Russia with his song "Mechta (Dream)". He finished 6th in the final of the contest with 80 points.

== Background ==
Prior to the 2016 Contest, Russia had participated in the Junior Eurovision Song Contest ten times since its debut in 2005. Russia have participated at ever contest since its debut, and have won the contest once in 2006 with the song "Vesenniy Jazz", performed by Tolmachevy Twins. The twin sisters went on to become the first act from a Junior Eurovision Song Contest to represent their country at the Eurovision Song Contest, performing the song "Shine" at the Eurovision Song Contest 2014, in Copenhagen, Denmark.

== Before Junior Eurovision ==
=== National final ===
The Russian broadcaster, Russia-1, revealed the details about the selection on 4 August 2015, and on the same day announced that applications could be submitted between then and September 10. The original song must have at least one verse and one chorus in Russian, but up to 25% of the song can be in another language. The song must last at least 2:50 and it cannot exceed three minutes. The participants have to be Russian citizens or have a legal residence permit and be between 10 and 15 years of age. The maximum number of participants on stage is six.

==== Final ====
The final was broadcast live on the television channel Karusel from Moscow on 25 September 2015. The winner was selected by a 50/50 jury-televote split. Viewers were able to vote for their favorites online. The jury was composed by 7 members, including Alisa Kozhikina (who represented Russia last year), Philipp Kirkorov (Eurovision composer and singer, represented Russia in 1995) and Julia Savicheva (represented Russia in 2004 at the adult ESC). Both Philipp and Julia performed during the interval act.

Final – 25 September 2015
Draw	Artist	Song	Bonus	Jury	Televote		Total	Place
Draw	Artist	Song	Bonus	Jury	Votes	Points	Total	Place
1	Caramel Sky	"Tvist-syurpriz" (Твист-сюрприз)	12	0	4,381	0	12	14
2	Yulia Asessorova	"Oblako" (Облако)	12	6	7,422	7	25	4
3	Kameliya Pedan	"Zhar-ptitsa" (Жар-птица)	12	0	3,112	0	12	15
4	Mikhail Smirnov	"Mechta" (Мечта)	12	12	8,345	10	34	1
5	4 Kadra	"Ulybnis" (Улыбнись)	12	1	7,335	6	19	7
6	Alexandra Gorodetskaya	"Parol" (Пароль)	12	0	4,741	1	13	13
7	Vilena Khikmatullina	"Vyshe neba" (Выше неба)	12	5	3,816	0	17	8
8	Eden Golan	"Schastye" (Счастье)	12	10	4,171	0	22	5
9	Daria Pereverzeva	"Mir" (Мир)	12	0	3,131	0	12	16
10	Khikmatullina & Maneshina	"Begi" (Беги)	12	8	7,489	8	28	3
11	Sonya Lapshakova	"A ya smogu!" (А я смогу!)	12	4	7,311	5	21	6
12	Katya Maneshina	"Ya vybirayu svet" (Я выбираю свет)	12	3	3,466	0	15	11
13	Daria Kim	"Letat" (Летать)	12	0	3,517	0	12	18
14	Mlilana Pavlova	"Pyatyy okean" (Пятый океан)	12	0	3,433	0	12	17
15	Anna Tomilo	"Ya narisuyu" (Я нарисую)	12	2	5,078	2	16	9
16	Maria Mirova	"Letat" (Летать)	12	7	8,417	12	31	2
17	Ekaterina Bizina	"Otkroy glaza" (Открой глаза)	12	0	7,263	4	16	10
18	Sofia Fedorova	"Zvezdopad" (Зведопад)	12	0	5,367	3	15	12

== Artist and song information ==
=== Mikhail Smirnov ===
Mikhail Smirnov Михаил Смирнов
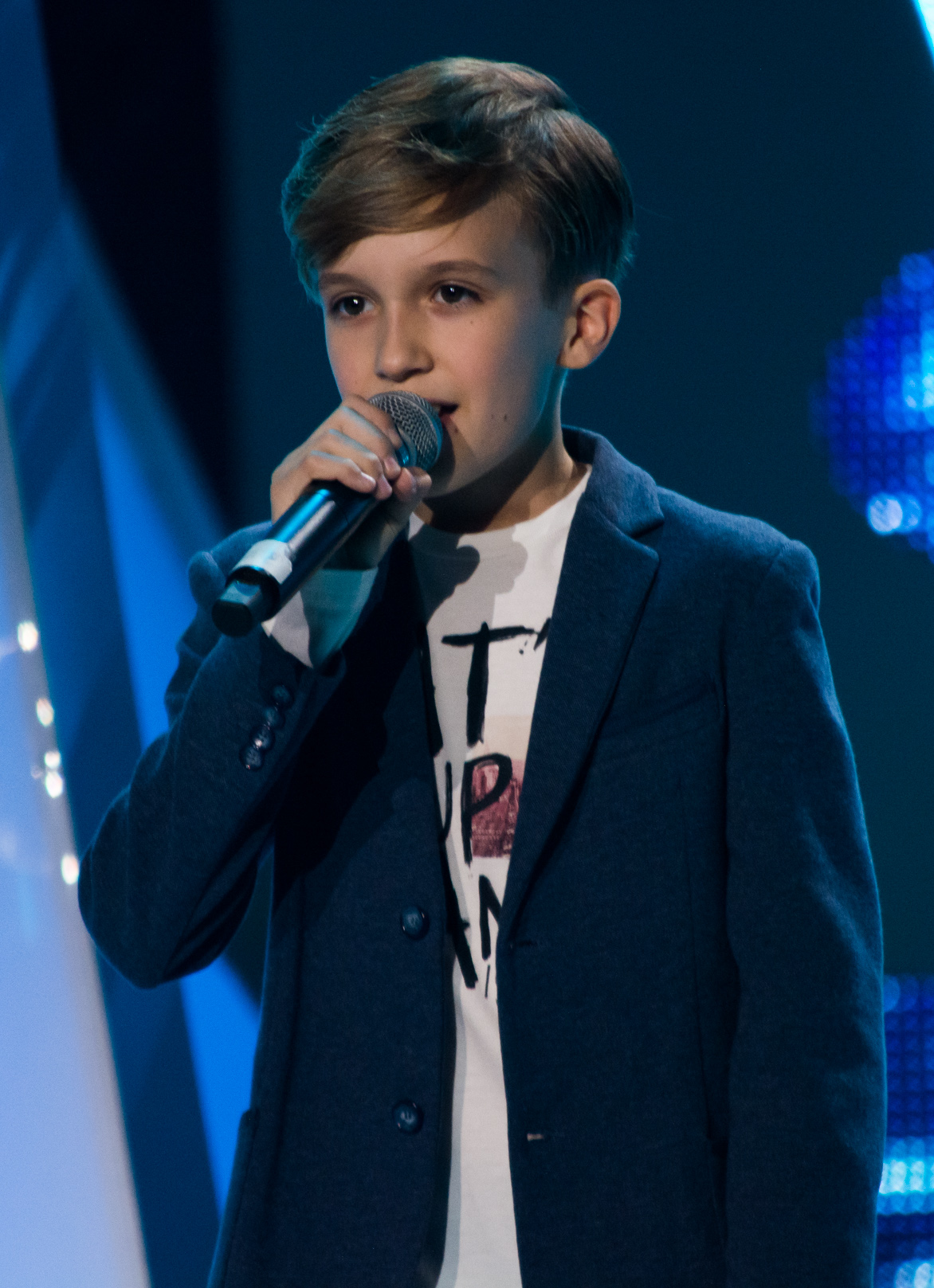

Background information
- Also known as: Misha Smirnov
- Born: 30 April 2003 (age 22); Moscow, Russia
- Genres: Pop
- Occupation: Singer
- Instrument: Vocals
- Years active: 2013–present
- Website: http://mishasmirnov.ru

Mikhail Smirnov (Russian: Михаил Смирнов; born April 30, 2003), better known by his stage name Misha Smirnov, is a Russian child singer. He represented Russia in the Junior Eurovision Song Contest 2015 with the song "Mechta" (Russian: Мечта, English: Dream).

Smirnov was born in the city of Moscow, Russia on April 30, 2003. Mikhail's success as a singer is no less impressive considering his family background - born to parents who are mathematicians, who both graduated from the Maths & Mechanics faculty at the Moscow State University. When he was three years old, Mikhail suddenly began to stutter and his parents sent him to singing lessons as part of the therapy. There, his first vocal coach noticed that Mikhail not only had a good ear for music but also a wonderful voice. His mother, who also graduated from music school and plays piano, cultivated Mikhail's love of music throughout his childhood.

Gradually gaining skills, Mikhail began not only performing at various competitions, but also winning prizes. At the age of eight he moved studios, and hit professional level by winning many prizes in his new environment. Despite his young age, Mikhail has a large number of titles to his name from both Russian and international competitions.

Mikhail is already an experienced actor and was a finalist on the second season of the Russian TV show The Voice Kids (Голос. Дети). Mikhail had to battle a series of strong female vocalists, many of whom rode the EDM trend with upbeat, danceable songs.

(Russia) "Mechta (Dream)"
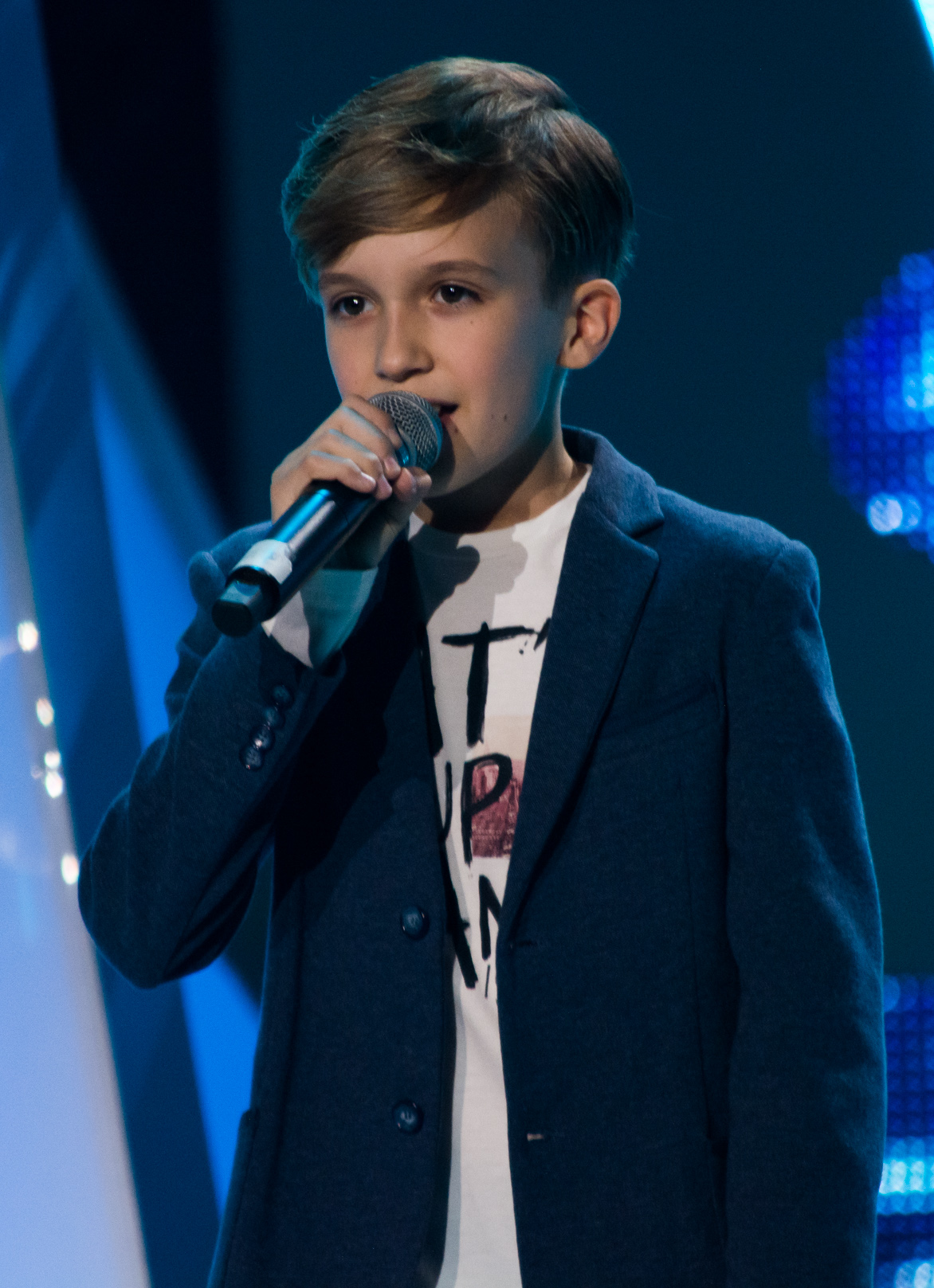

Junior Eurovision Song Contest 2015 entry
- Country: Russia
- Artist: Mikhail Smirnov
- Languages: Russian, English
- Composers: Vladimir Dushevny, Mikhail Smirnov
- Lyricists: Vladimir Dushevny, Mikhail Smirnov

Entry chronology
- ◄ "Dreamer" (2014)
- "Water of Life" (2016) ►

=== Mechta (Dream) ===
Mechta (Dream) is a song by Russian child singer Mikhail Smirnov. It represented Russia in the Junior Eurovision Song Contest 2015 in Sofia, Bulgaria.

== At Junior Eurovision ==
At the running order draw which took place on 15 November 2015, Russia were drawn to perform eighth on 21 November 2015, following Ireland and preceding Macedonia.

=== Voting ===
Points awarded to Russia
Score	Country
12 points (Note: All countries received one set of 12 points to ensure no country finished with nul points.)	
10 points	
8 points	San Marino
7 points	Armenia; Belarus; Bulgaria; Serbia
6 points	Netherlands; Slovenia
5 points	Kids Jury
4 points	Italy; Ukraine
3 points	Albania; Macedonia
2 points	
1 point	Australia

Points awarded by Russia
Score	Country
12 points	Armenia
10 points	Belarus
8 points	Slovenia
7 points	San Marino
6 points	Malta
5 points	Serbia
4 points	Ukraine
3 points	Australia
2 points	Ireland
1 point	Georgia

==== Detailed voting results ====
The following members comprised the Russian jury:

- Sati Kazanova
- Yulia Nachalova
- Sergey Shirokov
- Anna Shulgina
- Maria Kozhevnikova

Detailed voting results from Russia
Draw	Country	S. Kazanova	Y. Nachalova	S. Shirokov	A. Shulgina	M. Kozhevnikova	Average Jury Points	Televoting Points	Points Awarded
01	Serbia	10	6	6	8	6	8	1	5
02	Georgia	5		3			1	3	1
03	Slovenia	8	3	5	6	5	5	8	8
04	Italy	3		1					
05	Netherlands	2	5	7	2	2	4		
06	Australia	7	7	8	5	7	7		3
07	Ireland		2			1		5	2
08	Russia								
09	Macedonia								
10	Belarus	4	8	10	7	8	10	7	10
11	Armenia	12	12	12	12	12	12	12	12
12	Ukraine	1	4	2	3	4	3	4	4
13	Bulgaria		1			3			
14	San Marino				10		2	10	7
15	Malta	6	10	4	4	10	6	6	6
16	Albania							2	
17	Montenegro				1				
