= Albania in the Junior Eurovision Song Contest 2015 =

- Junior Eurovision Song Contest 2015
- Country: Albania
- Selection process: Festivali i 52-të Mbarëkombëtar i Këngës për Fëmijë
- Selection date: Semi-final; 26 May 2015; Final; 27 May 2015

Competing entry
- Song: "Dambaje"
- Artist: Mishela Rapo

Placement
- Final result: 5th, 93 points

Participation chronology

Albania selected their Junior Eurovision Song Contest 2015 entry through Festivali i 52-të Mbarëkombëtar i Këngës për Fëmijë. The competing songs will be broken down into one semi-final taking place on 26 May 2015. Mishela Rapo and her song "Dambaje" will represent Albania.

== Before Junior Eurovision ==
=== Festivali i Këngës për Fëmijë ===
On 13 March 2015, it was announced that Albania will participate at the Junior Eurovision Song Contest 2015. On 6 May 2015 it was reported that the winner of Festivali i 52-të Mbarëkombëtar i Këngës për Fëmijë will represent Albania at the Junior Eurovision Song Contest 2015.

Final – 27 May 2015
Draw	Artist	Song	Result
1	Franceska Aurora Verzeroli and Jasmina Dervishi	"Vallja fëmijët i bashkon"	—
2	Zhaklina Veizaj	"Të dua vendi im"	—
3	Jasmina Hako	"Do të vij një ditë"	—
4	Anjeza Sejdia	"Ku ta gjej daullen gjyshi"	—
5	Amela Buzi	"Bota blu"	—
6	Xhamerino Bollati	"Rramp e Bamp e Bum Bum Bum"	—
7	Elisa Gjipi	"Nuk dua të rritem"	—
8	Livia Murataj	"Eksploroj"	—
9	Klodjana Vata & Igli Bodurri	"Bota gjithë dashuri"	—
10	Amela Agastra	"Kurrë mos thuaj jo"	—
11	Dario Zela	"Hëna–çapkënia"	3
12	Mishela Rapo	"Dambaje"	1
13	Marko Strazimiri	"Nuk di se çfarë të them"	—
14	Wendi Mancaku and Vanessa Sono	"Jeto"	2

== Participant ==
=== Mishela Rapo ===
Mishela Rapo
- Born: 15 December 2000 (age 24); Tirana, Albania
- Occupation: Singer
- Years active: 2010–present

Mishela Rapo was born on 15 December 2000 in Tirana, Albania. In 2012, she attempted to represent Albania in the Junior Eurovision Song Contest 2012 with the song "Mama Mia (Te Amo)", but did not win. On 27 May 2015, Rapo was declared the winner of Festivali i 52-të Mbarëkombëtar i Këngës për Fëmijë with her song "Dambaje". She represented Albania in the Junior Eurovision Song Contest 2015, finishing in 5th place with 93 points.

=== Dambaje ===
(Albania) "Dambaje"

Junior Eurovision Song Contest 2015 entry
- Country: Albania
- Artist: Mishela Rapo
- Languages: Albanian, English, Turkish, Italian, German, French, Serbo-Croatian, Imaginary
- Composer: Adrian Hila
- Lyricist: Pandi Laço

Entry chronology
- ◄ "Kam një këngë vetëm për ju" (2012)
- "Besoj" (2016) ►

"Dambaje" is a song by the Albanian singer Mishela Rapo. It represented Albania at the Junior Eurovision Song Contest 2015 in Sofia, Bulgaria.

On 27 of May 2015, RTSH held the Festivali 53 i Femijeve contest. The winner of the contest would be selected to represent Albania at the forthcoming Junior Eurovision Song Contest. Mishela Rapo won the contest and, thus, won the right to represent Albania in Bulgaria on 21 November. The music is composed by Adrian Hila, while the lyrics are by Pandi Laço. Both have worked together on songs for Eurovision to represent Albania. While the song is performed in Albanian, it also has a line in six other languages. This song marks the first time Turkish has been used in a Junior Eurovision Song Contest entry.

== At Junior Eurovision ==
At the running order draw which took place on 15 November 2015, Albania were drawn to perform sixteenth on 21 November 2015, following Malta and preceding Montenegro.

=== Voting ===
Points awarded to Albania
Score	Country
12 points (Note: All countries received one set of 12 points to ensure no country finished with nul points.)	Italy
10 points	
8 points	Australia; Montenegro; Slovenia
7 points	Macedonia
6 points	Armenia; Bulgaria
5 points	Ireland
4 points	Georgia; San Marino; Serbia
3 points	Kids Jury
2 points	Belarus; Malta
1 point	Netherlands; Ukraine

Points awarded by Albania
Score	Country
12 points	Malta
10 points	Armenia
8 points	Georgia
7 points	Macedonia
6 points	Belarus
5 points	Australia
4 points	Italy
3 points	Russia
2 points	Ukraine
1 point	Montenegro

==== Detailed voting results ====
The following members comprised the Albanian jury:

- Zana Shuteriqi
- Eriona Rushiti
- Kristaq Koçi
- Enis Mulla
- Hajk Zaharian

Detailed voting results from Albania
Draw	Country	Z. Shuteriqi	E. Rushiti	K. Koçi	E. Mulla	H. Zaharian	Average Jury Points	Televoting Points	Points Awarded
01	Serbia								
02	Georgia	5	2	7	4	1	3	8	8
03	Slovenia	2	1		3	8	2	3	
04	Italy	7	6	5	2	7	7	2	4
05	Netherlands	4	3	6	1	6	4		
06	Australia	3	8	8	6		5	4	5
07	Ireland			4					
08	Russia	8	7		10	5	8		3
09	Macedonia					4		10	7
10	Belarus	10	10	10	8		10		6
11	Armenia	6		3	5	12	6	7	10
12	Ukraine		5					6	2
13	Bulgaria		4		7	2	1	1	
14	San Marino			2					
15	Malta	12	12	12	12	10	12	12	12
16	Albania								
17	Montenegro	1		1		3		5	1

== Commentator and spokesperson ==
Year	Commentator	Spokesperson
2015	Andri Xhahu	Majda Bejzade
