= Slovenia in the Junior Eurovision Song Contest 2015 =

2015 song performed by Lina Kuduzović

- Junior Eurovision Song Contest 2015
- Country: Slovenia
- Selection process: Mini EMA 2015
- Selection date: Semi-finals: 20 September 2015; 27 September 2015; Final: 4 October 2015

Competing entry
- Song: "Prva ljubezen"
- Artist: Lina Kuduzović

Placement
- Final result: 3rd, 112 points

Participation chronology

Slovenia selected their Junior Eurovision Song Contest 2015 entry through Mini EMA 2015. The competing songs were broken down into two semi-finals taking place on 20 September and 27 September 2015 and the final on 4 October 2015. Lina Kuduzović was declared the winner and she represented Slovenia with her song "Prva ljubezen". She ended 3rd with 112 points, marking Slovenia's best result in both the Junior and Adult Eurovision Song Contests.

== Before Junior Eurovision ==
=== Mini EMA 2015 ===
Mini EMA 2015 was the Slovenian national final format that was used by RTV Slovenija to select Slovenia's entry for the Junior Eurovision Song Contest 2015.

==== Format ====
Mini EMA 2015 consisted of two semi-finals and a final. Six artists competed in Mini EMA, with 3 songs in each semi-final. In the two semi-finals, a three-member jury panel selected the winning song to proceed to the final. In the final, public televoting exclusively determined the winner. The competition was broadcast as a part of the television program Vikend paket.

==== Competing entries ====
Artists and composers were able to submit their entries to the broadcaster between 17 July 2015 and 31 August 2015. An expert committee consisting of Alenka Godec (singer), Anka Jazbec (director and conductor of the RTV Slovenija Children’s Choir) and Boštjan Grabnar (musician, composer, arranger and producer) selected six artists and songs for the competition from the received submissions. The competing artists were announced on 4 September 2015. The running order for the semi-finals were announced on 10 September 2015.

Artist	Song	Songwriter(s)
Janina Klenovšek	"Sonce v ogledalu"	Rok Golob, Janina Klenovšek, Katarina Habe
Jaka & Maks	"Full of Energy"	Zala Smolnikar, Renata Smolnikar, Jaka Dolinšek, Maks Dolinšek
Leni	"Najlepši dan"	Aleš Klinar, Alenka Vozlič, Tina Muc, Anja Rupel
Lina Kuduzović	"Prva ljubezen"	Lina Kuduzović, Maraaya, Sebina Kuduzović
Rebeka Satler	"S tabo (Let You Go)"	Alex Volasko, Rebeka Satler
Tina Vinter	"Brez okov"	Zvone Hranjec, Tea Vindiš, Tina Vinter

==== Semi-finals ====
The semi-finals of Mini EMA 2015 took place on 20 and 27 September 2015. A three-member jury panel selected one entry per semi-final to proceed to the final. The jury consisted of Nuška Drašček (singer), Nina Pušlar (singer-songwriter) and Patrik Greblo (head of music production for RTV Slovenija).

Semi-final 1 – 20 September 2015
Draw	Artist	Song	Result
1	Rebeka Satler	"S tabo (Let You Go)"	Eliminated
2	Janina Klenovšek	"Sonce v ogledalu"	Eliminated
3	Leni	"Najlepši dan"	Finalist

Semi-final 2 – 27 September 2015
Draw	Artist	Song	Result
1	Lina Kuduzović	"Prva ljubezen"	Finalist
2	Jaka & Maks	"Full of Energy"	Eliminated
3	Tina Vinter	"Brez okov"	Eliminated

==== Final ====
The final of Mini EMA 2015 took place on 4 October 2015. A public vote selected "Prva ljubezen" performed by Lina Kuduzović as the winner.

Final – 4 October 2015
Draw	Artist	Song	Place
1	Leni	"Najlepši dan"	2
2	Lina Kuduzović	"Prva ljubezen"	1

== Artist and song information ==
(Slovenia) "Prva ljubezen"

Junior Eurovision Song Contest 2015 entry
- Country: Slovenia
- Artist: Lina Kuduzović
- Languages: Slovene, English
- Composers: Lina Kuduzović, Maraaya, Krešimir Tomec
- Lyricists: Lina Kuduzović, Sebina Kuduzović, Maraaya

Finals performance
- Final result: 3rd
- Final points: 112

Entry chronology
- ◄ "Nisi sam (Your Light)" (2014)

"My song is about an experience that everyone must go through. One's first love is what everyone remembers forever."

—Lina Kuduzović

=== Lina Kuduzović ===
Lina Kuduzović was born on 30 December 2002 in Ljubljana, the capital of Slovenia. She has competed in many singing contests throughout her career, and has won many awards. In 2010, when she was just 7 years old, Kuduzović won the first season of Slovenija ima talent (Slovenia's Got Talent).

=== Prva ljubezen ===
"Prva ljubezen" (English: First love) is a song by Slovenian child singer Lina Kuduzović who won the first season of Slovenia's Got Talent. It represented Slovenia at the Junior Eurovision Song Contest 2015 in Bulgaria and she achieved 3rd place with 112 points which is Slovenia's best ever placing in a Junior Eurovision or Eurovision event.

== At Junior Eurovision ==
At the running order draw which took place on 15 November 2015, Slovenia were drawn to perform third on 21 November 2015, following Georgia and preceding Italy. Slovenia finished in third place with 112 points.

The final was broadcast in Slovenia on TV SLO 1 with commentary by Andrej Hofer. The Slovenian spokesperson, who announced the Slovenian votes during the final, was Nikola Petek.

=== Final ===
Lina wore a white dress with a blue sash and a pink heart on the side of it. A huge snowflake appeared on the stage floor, and snow was falling in the backdrop during the entire performance. "Prva ljubezen" is a wintry love story, so a huge castle and pine trees covered in snow decorated the backdrop throughout the entire song. Dry ice and a wind machine were used during her performance.

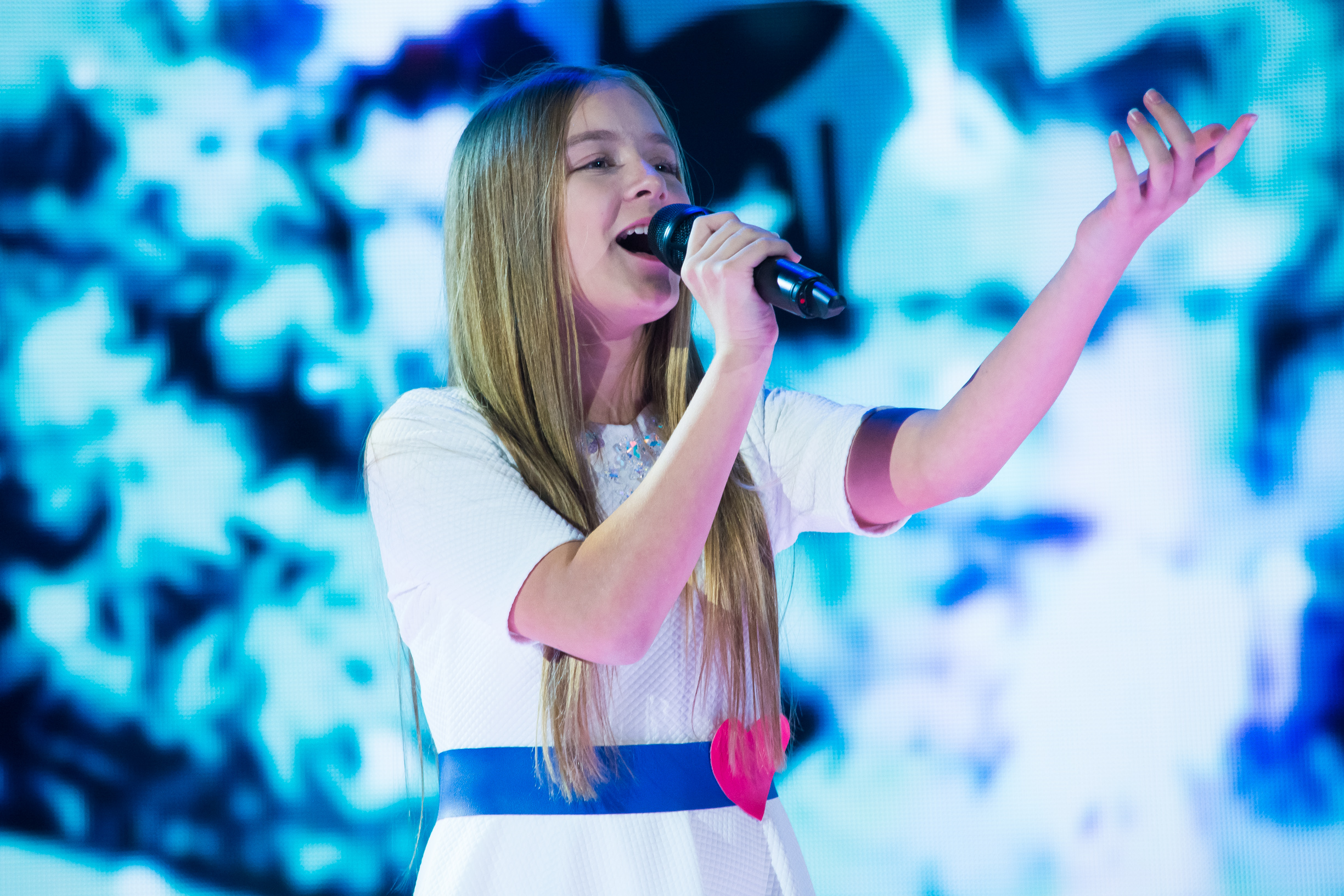
Third placed Lina Kuduzović performing during the contest for Slovenia

At the end of the voting, Slovenia placed 3rd with 112 points.

=== Voting ===
The voting during the final consisted of 50 percent public televoting and 50 percent from a jury deliberation. The jury consisted of five music industry professionals who were citizens of the country they represent, with their names published before the contest to ensure transparency. This jury was asked to judge each contestant based on: vocal capacity; the stage performance; the song's composition and originality; and the overall impression by the act. In addition, no member of a national jury could be related in any way to any of the competing acts in such a way that they cannot vote impartially and independently. The individual rankings of each jury member were released one month after the final.

Following the release of the full split voting by the EBU after the conclusion of the competition, it was revealed that Slovenia had placed third with the public televote and fourth with the jury vote. In the public vote, Slovenia scored 98 points, while with the jury vote, Slovenia scored 77 points.

Below is a breakdown of points awarded to Slovenia and awarded by Slovenia in the final and the breakdown of the jury voting and televoting conducted during the final.

Points awarded to Slovenia
Score	Country
12 points (Note: All countries received one set of 12 points to ensure no country finished with nul points.)	
10 points	Armenia; Ukraine
8 points	Belarus; Bulgaria; Netherlands; Russia
7 points	Italy
6 points	Australia; Ireland; Kids Jury; San Marino; Serbia
5 points	Georgia
4 points	
3 points	Malta
2 points	Montenegro
1 point	Macedonia

Points awarded by Slovenia
Score	Country
12 points	Malta
10 points	Armenia
8 points	Albania
7 points	Serbia
6 points	Russia
5 points	Netherlands
4 points	Ireland
3 points	Belarus
2 points	Montenegro
1 point	Bulgaria

==== Detailed voting results ====
The following members comprised the Slovene jury:

- Alenka Godec
- Miha Gorše
- Nuška Drašček
- Lea Sirk
- Boštjan Grabnar

Detailed voting results from Slovenia
Draw	Country	A. Godec	M. Gorše	N. Drašček	L. Sirk	B. Grabnar	Average Jury Points	Televoting Points	Points Awarded
01	Serbia	3	3	4	5	4	3	10	7
02	Georgia								
03	Slovenia								
04	Italy		4	2			2		
05	Netherlands	7	8	7	10	8	8		5
06	Australia	6	2	3	6	3	4		
07	Ireland	2			1	1		6	4
08	Russia	5	7	5	4	5	6	5	6
09	Macedonia							2	
10	Belarus	4	5	6	3	7	5		3
11	Armenia	10	12	10	8	10	10	7	10
12	Ukraine		1						
13	Bulgaria	1		1	2	2	1	3	1
14	San Marino							1	
15	Malta	12	10	12	12	12	12	12	12
16	Albania	8	6	8	7	6	7	8	8
17	Montenegro							4	2
