= Ireland in the Junior Eurovision Song Contest 2015 =

- Junior Eurovision Song Contest 2015
- Country: Ireland
- Selection process: Junior Eurovision Éire 2015
- Selection date: Semi-final; 11 October 2015; 18 October 2015; 25 October 2015; 1 November 2015; Final; 8 November 2015

Competing entry
- Song: "Réalta na mara"
- Artist: Aimee Banks

Placement
- Final result: 12th, 36 points

Participation chronology

Ireland selected their Junior Eurovision Song Contest 2015 entry through Junior Eurovision Éire. The competing songs were broken down into four semi-finals. On 23 March 2015 it was announced that Ireland would debut at the Junior Eurovision Song Contest 2015.

Junior Eurovision Éire was won by Aimee Banks, who sang "Réalta na mara" for Ireland at the contest. She placed 12th with 36 points.

== Before Junior Eurovision ==
=== Junior Eurovision Éire ===
The jury members in the first edition of Junior Eurovision Éire were Stiofán Ó Fearail (singer, songwriter, musician and television presenter), Niamh Kavanagh (singer, Eurovision Song Contest 1993 winner), and Brian Kennedy (singer, Irish representative in the Eurovision Song Contest 2006).

==== Semi-final 1 ====
Draw	Artist	Song	Songwriter(s)	Result
1	Lisa-Rose McMahon	"Bris amach"	Lisa-Rose McMahon, Brendan McCaughey, Carmel McGivney	Final Duel
2	Jessica Doolan	"Mise sa todhchaí"	Jessica Doolan, Hugh Doolan	Eliminated
3	David Kennedy	"Fuar"	David Kennedy, Emma O'Reilly	Final Duel
4	Eva Roantree	"Geallaim duit"	Eva Roantree, Gary Burke	Eliminated
5	Eva Campbell	"I mo fhéileacán"	Eva Campbell, Leo Capper	Eliminated
6	Katie O’Donoghue	"Síscéal"	Katie O'Donghue, Elsa Joyce, Jamie O'Donoghue, Ruby Fairclough	Eliminated
7	Amy Meehan	"Gan tú"	Amy Meehan, Tommy Conway, Geraldine Galligan	Eliminated
8	Ellen McAteer	"Dubh agus bán"	Ellen McAteer	Eliminated

Artist	Song	S. Ó Fearail	N. Kavanagh	B. Kennedy	Votes	Result
David Kennedy	"Fuar"	X		X	2	Advanced
Lisa-Rose McMahon	"Bris amach"		X		1	Eliminated

==== Semi-final 2 ====
Draw	Artist	Song	Songwriter(s)	Result
1	Aimee Banks	"Réalta na mara"	Aimee Banks, Niall Mooney, Jonas Gladnikoff, Brendan McCarthy	Final Duel
2	Na Cork Rappers	"Is maith liom é"	Na Cork Rappers, GMC Beats, Webwise, YWIC	Eliminated
3	Ellie Power	"Mo ghrá"	Ellie Power	Eliminated
4	Kelly Irwin	"Fíor chairde"	Kelly Irwin, Greg French	Final Duel
5	Ashley Tubridy	"Múr samhraidh"	Ashley Tubridy	Eliminated
6	Ruby Buckley	"Síocháin"	Ruby Buckley, Ylva Persson, Linda Persson	Eliminated
7	Ellie Quinlan	"Ag taisteal an domhain"	Ellie Quinlan	Eliminated
8	Maude Adams	"Dubh ’is gorm"	Maude Adams	Eliminated

Artist	Song	S. Ó Fearail	B. Kennedy	Votes	Result
Aimee Banks	"Réalta na mara"	X	X	2	Advanced
Kelly Irwin	"Fíor chairde"			0	Eliminated

==== Semi-final 3 ====
Draw	Artist	Song	Songwriter(s)	Result
1	Aislí Moran	"Aisling"	Aislí Moran, Greg French, Miss Ali	Final Duel
2	Muireann Vaughan	"Miongháire"	Muireann Vaughan	Final Duel
3	Adam Moloney	"Lá ámháin"	Adam Moloney	Eliminated
4	Aoibhín Walsh	"Féileacán i mo shaol"	Aoibhín Walsh, Brendan Keeley	Eliminated
5	Rachel Galvin	"Bhíomar i ngrá"	Rachel Galvin, Dearbhla Collins	Eliminated
6	Revolutionary	"Splancacha"	Ellen McGroary, Aoife Breslin, Síofra Mauerhofer, Aoibhín Woods	Eliminated
7	Leah Kavanagh	"Tusa agus mise"	Leah Kavanagh, Daire McGabhann, Áine Mulvey, Natasha Senanayake	Eliminated
8	Amy Scollard	"Grá go deo"	Amy Scollard, Elaine McCabe Cudden	Eliminated

Artist	Song	S. Ó Fearail	N. Kavanagh	B. Kennedy	Votes	Result
Aislí Moran	"Aisling"			X	1	Eliminated
Muireann Vaughan	"Miongháire"	X	X		2	Advanced

==== Semi-final 4 ====
Draw	Artist	Song	Songwriter(s)	Result
1	Zena Donnelly	"I d’aonair"	Zena Donnelly	Final Duel
2	Sophie Halligan	"Caillte gan tú"	Sophie Halligan, Paddy Reilly	Final Duel
3	Sceitimíní	"Sé seo mo ghuí"	Sceitimíní, Blue Ribbon Arts	Eliminated
4	Paddy Heneghan	"Rún"	Paddy Heneghan, Kate Heneghan, Art O’Suilleabhan	Eliminated
5	Katie Ball	"Ag damhsa liomsa"	Katie Ball, Greg French	Eliminated
6	Jane Breathnach	"An chéad uair"	Jane Breathnach, Kevin Breathnach, Billy Larkin	Eliminated
7	Lillie Foley	"Tóg mó lámh"	Lillie Foley, Flossie Plain	Eliminated
8	Olivia Emade	"Seo í an oíche"	Olivia Emade, Michael English	Eliminated

Artist	Song	S. Ó Fearail	N. Kavanagh	B. Kennedy	Votes	Result
Sophie Halligan	"Caillte gan tú"		X		1	Eliminated
Zena Donnelly	"I d’aonair"	X		X	2	Advanced

Final

Along with the winners from the four heats, two wildcard acts were entered into the final. They were Lisa-Rose McMahon who came second in week 1 and Aislí Moran who came second in week 3. For the final, a sing-off was introduced between the top two contenders.

Draw	Artist	Song	Result
1	Zena Donnelly	"I d’aonair"	Final Duel
2	Lisa-Rose McMahon	"Bris amach"	Eliminated
3	Muireann Vaughan	"Miongháire"	Eliminated
4	Aimee Banks	"Réalta na mara"	Final Duel
5	David Kennedy	"Fuar"	Eliminated
6	Aislí Moran	"Aisling"	Eliminated

Draw	Artist	Song	S. Ó Fearail	N. Kavanagh	B. Kennedy	Votes
1	Aimee Banks	"Réalta na mara"	X	X		2
2	Zena Donnelly	"I d’aonair"			X	1

== Artist and song information ==
(Republic of Ireland) "Réalta na Mara"

Junior Eurovision Song Contest 2015 entry
- Country: Ireland
- Artist: Aimee Banks
- Languages: Irish
- Composers: Aimee Banks, Niall Mooney, Jonas Gladnikoff, Brendan McCarthy
- Lyricist: Aimee Banks

Finals performance
- Final result: 12
- Final points: 36

=== Aimee Banks ===
Aimee Banks (born 14 February 2002) is a young soprano from Moycullen, in County Galway. She represented Ireland in the Junior Eurovision Song Contest 2015 with "Réalta na Mara", (lit. Star of the sea), a song which she co-wrote and composed with Niall Mooney, Jonas Gladnikoff and Brendan McCarthy.

=== Réalta na Mara ===
"Réalta na Mara" (English: Star of the Sea) is a song performed by Aimee Banks, which represented Ireland in the Junior Eurovision Song Contest 2015, placing 12th in a field of 17 countries.

== At Junior Eurovision ==
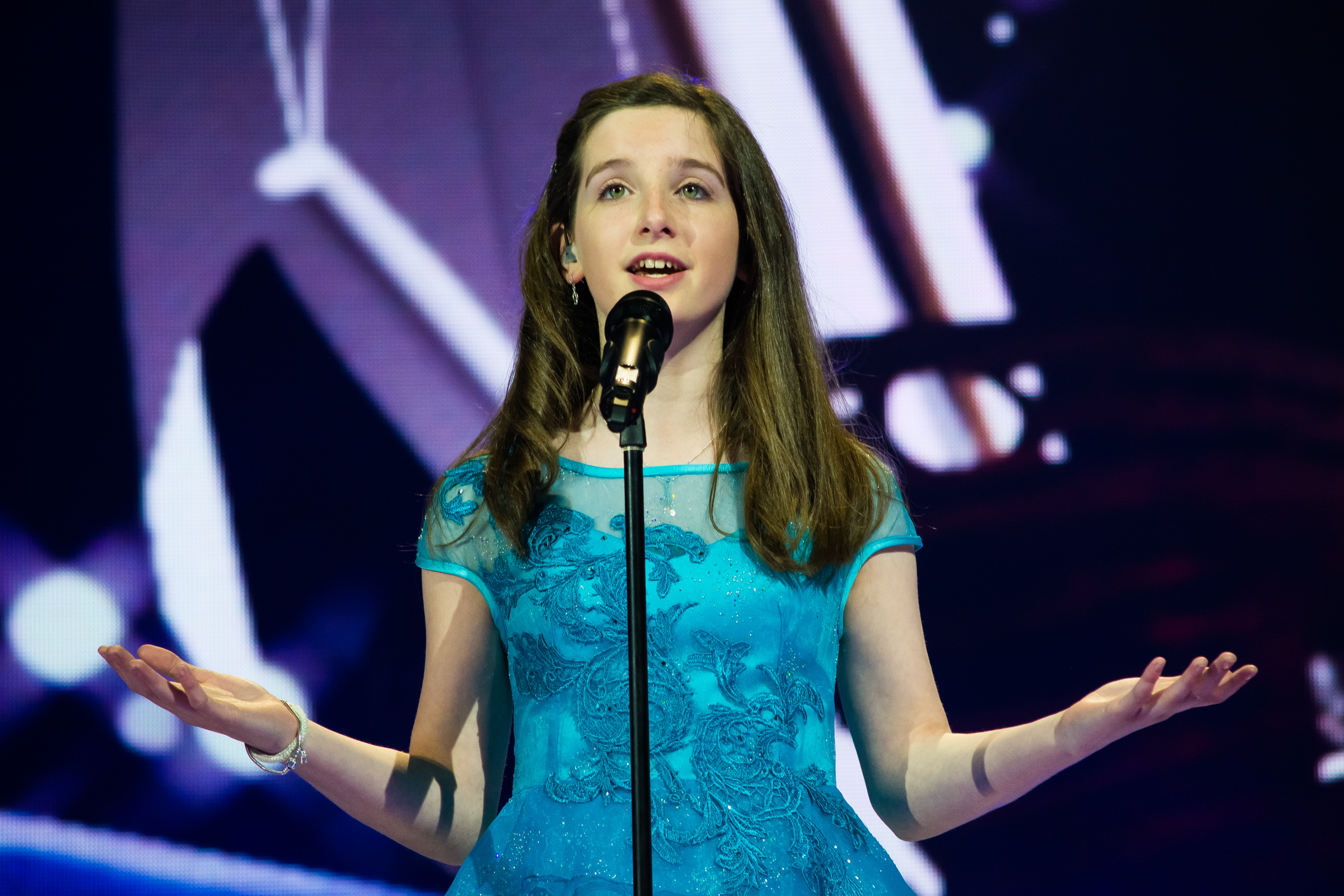
Aimee Banks at stage of JESC 2015

At the running order draw which took place on 15 November 2015, Ireland were drawn to perform seventh on 21 November 2015, following Australia and preceding Russia.

=== Final ===
The staging consisted of a deep purple background with a multitude of stars. The 'star of the sea' also appeared in bright light towards the end of the song. The other important notice was that the waves in the sea behind Aimee were less rough, becoming as the song progressed to match with the lyrics. The stage for the performance was covered in dry ice, giving a mystical effect to the performance.

At the end of the voting, Ireland finished 12th with 36 points.

=== Voting ===
The voting during the final consisted of 50 percent public televoting and 50 percent from a jury deliberation. The jury consisted of five music industry professionals who were citizens of the country they represent, with their names published before the contest to ensure transparency. This jury was asked to judge each contestant based on: vocal capacity; the stage performance; the song's composition and originality; and the overall impression by the act. In addition, no member of a national jury could be related in any way to any of the competing acts in such a way that they cannot vote impartially and independently. The individual rankings of each jury member were released one month after the final.

Following the release of the full split voting by the EBU after the conclusion of the competition, it was revealed that Ireland had placed 10th with the public televote and 14th with the jury vote. In the public vote, Ireland scored 43 points, while with the jury vote, Ireland scored 19 points.

Below is a breakdown of points awarded to Ireland and awarded by Ireland in the final and the breakdown of the jury voting and televoting conducted during the final.

Points awarded to Ireland
Score	Country
12 points (Note: All countries received one set of 12 points to ensure no country finished with nul points.)	
10 points	
8 points	
7 points	
6 points	Malta
5 points	Australia
4 points	Slovenia
3 points	
2 points	Bulgaria; Georgia; Netherlands; Russia
1 point	San Marino

Points awarded by Ireland
Score	Country
12 points	Bulgaria
10 points	Malta
8 points	Armenia
7 points	Belarus
6 points	Slovenia
5 points	Albania
4 points	Georgia
3 points	Serbia
2 points	Australia
1 point	Ukraine

==== Detailed voting results ====
The following members comprised the Irish jury:

- Caitríona Ní Cheannabáin
- Gearóid Ó Murchú
- Aoife Scott
- Morgan Cooke
- Keith Ó Briain

Detailed voting results from Ireland
Draw	Country	C. Ní Cheannabáin	G. Ó Murchú	A. Scott	M. Cooke	K. Ó Briain	Average Jury Points	Televoting Points	Points Awarded
01	Serbia	4	2	6	1		3	4	3
02	Georgia				6			10	4
03	Slovenia	2	6	5		8	5	7	6
04	Italy	1	5			4	1		
05	Netherlands	3		1	5				
06	Australia	5			3	6	4		2
07	Ireland								
08	Russia		1		2				
09	Macedonia		3	3	4	1	2		
10	Belarus	12	7	7	8	3	7	6	7
11	Armenia	10	8	10	12	12	12	5	8
12	Ukraine							2	1
13	Bulgaria	7	4	4		7	6	12	12
14	San Marino			2				1	
15	Malta	8	10	8	10	10	10	8	10
16	Albania	6	12	12	7	5	8	3	5
17	Montenegro					2			
