= Netherlands in the Junior Eurovision Song Contest 2015 =

- Junior Eurovision Song Contest 2015
- Country: Netherlands
- Selection process: Junior Songfestival 2015; 33% Jury; 33% Kids Jury; 34% Televoting
- Selection date: Semi-finals: 19 September 2015; 26 September 2015; Final: 3 October 2015

Competing entry
- Song: "Million Lights"
- Artist: Shalisa

Placement
- Final result: 15th, 35 points

Participation chronology

The Netherlands selected their Junior Eurovision Song Contest 2015 entry through Junior Songfestival 2015, a national selection consisting of eight songs. The competing songs broke down into two semi-finals, each consisting of four songs, and a final consisting of the top two placing songs from each semi-final and a special wildcard that was originally eliminated. The eight finalists were revealed on 2 April 2015. The final was held on 3 October 2015, while the two semi-finals were on 19 and 26 September.

== Before Junior Eurovision ==
=== Junior Songfestival 2015 ===
From each semi-final two entries qualified for the final based on the decision of adult and kids juries as well as televoting. The fifth entry in the final was chosen by online voting (web wildcard).

==== Competing entries ====
| Artist | Song (English Translation) | Songwriter(s) |
|---|---|---|
| 4Life | "You Will Know My Name" | Eric Van Tijn, Jochem Fluitsma, Kirsten Schneider, Mark Van Tijn, Esmee Visser, Flore van Kranenburg, Luna Alvarado, India Nanarjain |
| Daniël | "Special" | Daniël Dojčinović, Ed Struijlaart |
| Eliyha | "Like Everyone Else" | Eliyha Altena, Hansen Tomas, Joost Griffioen |
| Guusje | "Talk About Love" | Jochem Fluitsma, Eric Van Tijn, Kirsten Schneider, Guusje Schuit |
| Katrina | "Dit is pas het begin" (This is just the beginning) | Katrina Manaog, Allan Eshuijs, Jozien van Dorst, Michael Koendan-Panday, Danny Koendan-Panday |
| Myrthe | "Kinderen van de zon" (Children of the sun) | Myrthe Hendrix, Eva Neggers, Tjeerd van Zanen |
| Nohr | "Ik ben mezelf" (I am myself) | Nohr de Vos, Tjeerd Oosterhuis, Clifford Goilo |
| Shalisa | "Million Lights" | Shalisa van der Laan, Hansen Tomas, Joost Griffioen |

==== Shows ====
Table key
Participants who qualified to the final via jury and televoting.
Participants who qualified to the final via wildcard

==== Semi-final 1 ====
Semi-final 1 – 19 September 2015
| Draw | Artist | Song | Kids Jury | Jury | Televote | Total | Place | Result |
|---|---|---|---|---|---|---|---|---|
| 1 | Katrina | "Dit is pas het begin" | 9 | 9 | 9 | 27 | 3 | Eliminated |
| 2 | Daniël | "Special" | 8 | 8 | 8 | 24 | 4 | Eliminated |
| 3 | Guusje | "Talk About Love" | 12 | 10 | 10 | 32 | 2 | Advanced |
| 4 | Shalisa | "Million Lights" | 10 | 12 | 12 | 34 | 1 | Advanced |

==== Semi-final 2 ====
Semi-final 2 – 26 September 2015
| Draw | Artist | Song | Kids Jury | Jury | Televote | Total | Place | Result |
|---|---|---|---|---|---|---|---|---|
| 1 | 4Life | "You Will Know My Name" | 12 | 10 | 12 | 34 | 1 | Advanced |
| 2 | Eliyha | "Like Everyone Else" | 9 | 8 | 8 | 25 | 4 | Eliminated |
| 3 | Myrthe | "Kinderen van de zon" | 8 | 9 | 9 | 26 | 3 | Wildcard |
| 4 | Nohr | "Ik ben mezelf" | 10 | 12 | 10 | 32 | 2 | Advanced |

==== Final ====
Final – 3 October 2015
| Draw | Artist | Song | Kids Jury | Jury | Televote | Total | Place |
|---|---|---|---|---|---|---|---|
| 1 | Nohr | "Ik ben mezelf" | 9 | 10 | 8 | 27 | 3 |
| 2 | Myrthe | "Kinderen van de zon" | 7 | 9 | 7 | 23 | 5 |
| 3 | Guusje | "Talk About Love" | 8 | 7 | 9 | 24 | 4 |
| 4 | Shalisa | "Million Lights" | 12 | 12 | 12 | 36 | 1 |
| 5 | 4Life | "You Will Know My Name" | 10 | 8 | 10 | 28 | 2 |

== Artist and song information ==
=== Shalisa ===
Shalisa
- Born: Shalisa van der Laan; 19 December 1999 (age 25); Hoorn, Netherlands
- Genres: Pop
- Occupation(s): Singer, actress, voice actress
- Instruments: Vocals, piano
- Years active: 2012–present

Shalisa van der Laan (born 19 December 1999), known simply as Shalisa, is a Dutch singer, actress and voice actress. In 2012, she was a contestant in the first season of the Dutch talent show The Voice Kids, where she successfully made it to the battle rounds.

In 2014, she auditioned for Junior Songfestival for the first time, making it to the final round of auditions. In 2015, she auditioned again, this time with the ballad "Million Lights". She proceeded to the semi-finals and subsequently to the final, where she received the maximum score of 36 points.

=== Million Lights ===
(Netherlands) "Million Lights"

Junior Eurovision Song Contest 2015 entry
- Country: Netherlands
- Artist: Shalisa
- Languages: Dutch, English
- Composers: Shalisa van der Laan, Hansen Tomas, Joost Griffioen
- Lyricists: Shalisa van der Laan, Hansen Tomas, Joost Griffioen

Finals performance
- Final result: 15
- Final points: 35

Entry chronology
- ◄ "Around" (2014)
- "Kisses and Dancin'" (2016) ►

"Million Lights" is a song by Dutch teen singer Shalisa van der Laan. It represented the Netherlands in the Junior Eurovision Song Contest 2015, held in Sofia, Bulgaria. It finished in 15th place with 35 points, marking the country's then-worst placing in the contest, until their last place finish in 2021.

The song tells the story of two people who are in love, but who cannot be together because they live too far away from each other. The only way they can connect is by looking at the stars in the sky: there are 'a million lights' in the sky that can be seen from everywhere in the world.

== At Junior Eurovision ==
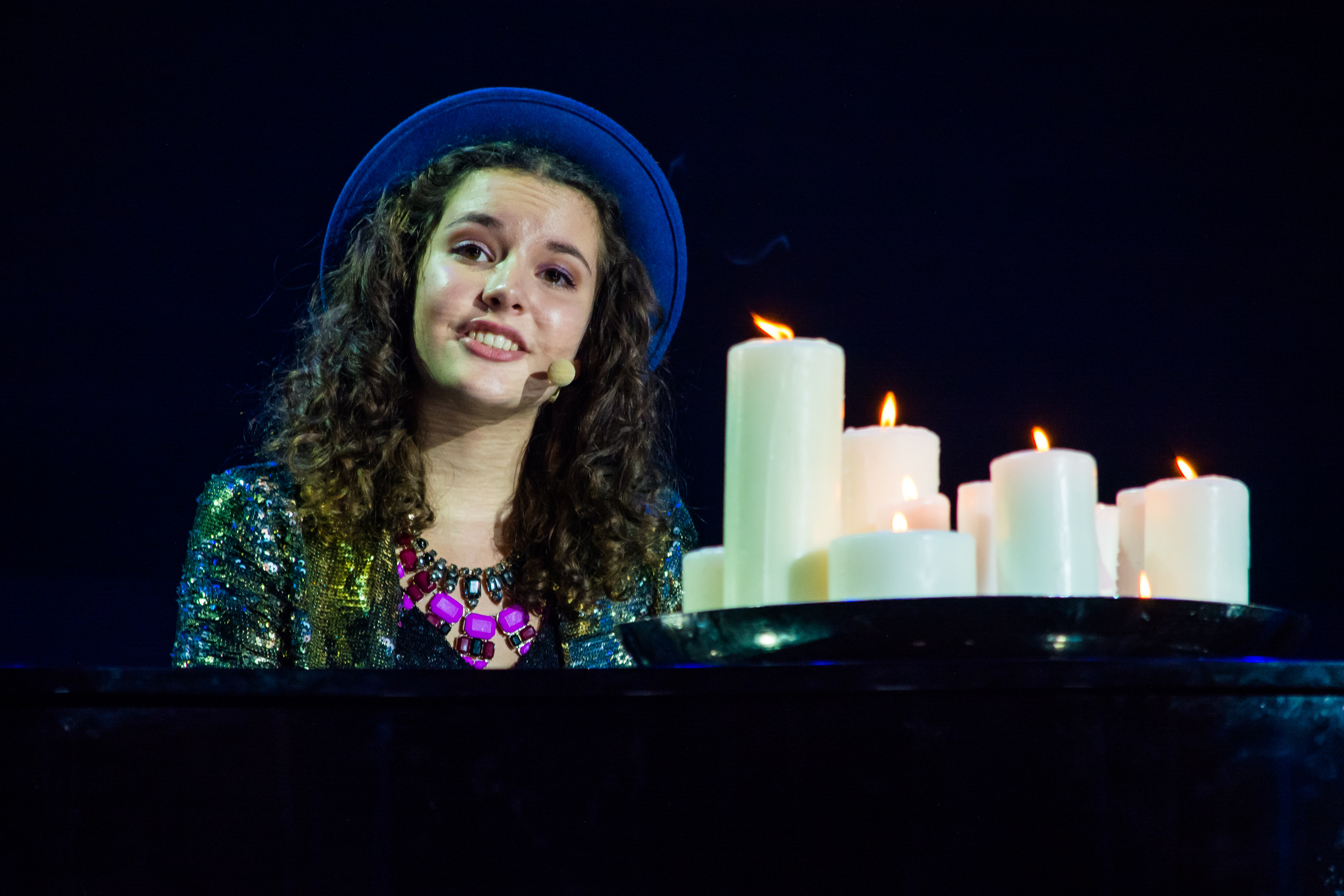
Shalisa performing "Million Lights"

At the running order draw which took place on 15 November 2015, Netherlands were drawn to perform fifth on 21 November 2015, following Italy and preceding Australia.

=== Final ===
Shalisa and her grand piano were the focus on the main stage, with her dancers on the left catwalk and her backing singers on the right.

=== Voting ===
The voting during the final consisted of 50 percent public televoting and 50 percent from a jury deliberation. The jury consisted of five music industry professionals who were citizens of the country they represent, with their names published before the contest to ensure transparency. This jury was asked to judge each contestant based on: vocal capacity; the stage performance; the song's composition and originality; and the overall impression by the act. In addition, no member of a national jury could be related in any way to any of the competing acts in such a way that they cannot vote impartially and independently. The individual rankings of each jury member were released one month after the final.

Following the release of the full split voting by the EBU after the conclusion of the competition, it was revealed that the Netherlands had placed 17th (last) with the public televote and 9th with the jury vote. In the public vote, the Netherlands scored 9 points, while with the jury vote, the Netherlands scored 53 points.

Below is a breakdown of points awarded to The Netherlands and awarded by The Netherlands in the final and the breakdown of the jury voting and televoting conducted during the final.

Points awarded to the Netherlands
| Score | Country |
|---|---|
| 12 points (Note: All countries received one set of 12 points to ensure no country finished with nul points.) | |
| 10 points | |
| 8 points | |
| 7 points | |
| 6 points | Georgia |
| 5 points | Slovenia |
| 4 points | Australia; Bulgaria |
| 3 points | |
| 2 points | San Marino |
| 1 point | Italy; Kids Jury |

Points awarded by the Netherlands
| Score | Country |
|---|---|
| 12 points | Armenia |
| 10 points | Malta |
| 8 points | Slovenia |
| 7 points | Belarus |
| 6 points | Russia |
| 5 points | Bulgaria |
| 4 points | Serbia |
| 3 points | Australia |
| 2 points | Ireland |
| 1 point | Albania |

==== Detailed voting results ====
The following members comprised the Dutch jury:

- Tjeerd van Zanen
- Kirsten Schneider
- Rachel Traets
- Marlou Wens
- Samantha Traets

Detailed voting results from the Netherlands
| Draw | Country | T. van Zanen | K. Schneider | R. Traets | M. Wens | S. Traets | Average Jury Points | Televoting Points | Points Awarded |
|---|---|---|---|---|---|---|---|---|---|
| 01 | Serbia | 2 | 4 | 4 | 5 | 6 | 4 | 4 | 4 |
| 02 | Georgia | | | | | | | | |
| 03 | Slovenia | 3 | 5 | 5 | 10 | 5 | 6 | 7 | 8 |
| 04 | Italy | 4 | 3 | | 1 | | 2 | | |
| 05 | Netherlands | | | | | | | | |
| 06 | Australia | 6 | 6 | 6 | 3 | 4 | 5 | 2 | 3 |
| 07 | Ireland | | | | 4 | | | 6 | 2 |
| 08 | Russia | 7 | 8 | 8 | 6 | 7 | 7 | 3 | 6 |
| 09 | Macedonia | | | | | | | | |
| 10 | Belarus | 8 | 12 | 12 | 7 | 12 | 12 | | 7 |
| 11 | Armenia | 10 | 10 | 10 | 8 | 10 | 10 | 12 | 12 |
| 12 | Ukraine | 5 | | 2 | 2 | 3 | 3 | | |
| 13 | Bulgaria | | | | | | | 8 | 5 |
| 14 | San Marino | | | | | | | 1 | |
| 15 | Malta | 12 | 7 | 7 | 12 | 8 | 8 | 10 | 10 |
| 16 | Albania | 1 | 1 | 1 | | 1 | | 5 | 1 |
| 17 | Montenegro | | 2 | 3 | | 2 | 1 | | |
