= Ireland in the Junior Eurovision Song Contest 2016 =

- Junior Eurovision Song Contest 2016
- Country: Ireland
- Selection process: National selection: Junior Eurovision Éire
- Selection date: Semi-final; 9 October 2016; 16 October 2016; 23 October 2016; 30 October 2016; Final; 6 November 2016

Competing entry
- Song: "Bríce ar Bhríce"
- Artist: Zena Donnelly
- Songwriters: Zena Donnelly

Placement
- Final result: 10th, 122 points

Participation chronology

Ireland was represented at the Junior Eurovision Song Contest 2016 which took place on 20 November 2016, in Valletta, Malta. The Irish broadcaster TG4 was responsible for organising their entry for the contest through a national selection show entitled Junior Eurovision Éire. The national final took place on 6 November 2016, while the semi-finals took place between 9–30 October. This was Ireland's second appearance at the Junior Eurovision Song Contest.

On 6 November, Zena Donnelly was selected to represent Ireland with a song she composed herself, "Brice ar Bhrice" (Brick by Brick). She placed 10th with 122 points.

== Background ==
Prior to the 2016 Contest, Ireland had participated in the Junior Eurovision Song Contest once since its debut in 2015. TG4 previously attempted to participate at the Junior Eurovision Song Contest 2014, but required funding from the Broadcasting Authority of Ireland (BAI), which was rejected.

== Before Junior Eurovision ==
The Irish broadcaster announced on 5 April 2016, that they would be participating at Junior Eurovision for the second time in their history. The mechanism for selecting their entrant and song was through the national selection show Junior Eurovision Éire. The selection process took place every Sunday starting on 9 October, in which thirty-two participants competed, and culminated into a final which was held on 6 November 2016.

=== Jury members ===
TG4 published details on the names of the professional jury who would determine the winner of the Junior Eurovision Éire 2016 and the representative for Ireland at the 2016 contest in November. They had all represented Ireland in the Eurovision Song Contest at least once in their careers.

Artist	ESC Year(s)	Song(s)	Place (Semi-final)	Points (Semi-final)	Place (Final)	Points (Final)
Sandie Jones	1972	"Ceol an Ghrá"	No semi-finals		15	72
Linda Martin	1984	"Terminal 3"	No semi-finals		2	137
Linda Martin	1992	"Why Me?"	No semi-finals		1	155
Niamh Kavanagh	1993	"In Your Eyes"	No semi-finals		1	187
Niamh Kavanagh	2010	"It's for You"	9	67	23	25
Dustin the Turkey	2008	"Irelande Douze Pointe"	15	22	Failed to qualify	
Jedward	2011	"Lipstick"	8	68	8	119
Jedward	2012	"Waterline"	6	92	19	46

The judging panel consisted of Fiachna Ó Braonáin and Paulien Scanlon, as well as a different guest judge each week.

== Junior Eurovision Éire ==
=== Semi-final 1 ===
The first semi-final took place on 9 October 2016, in which Jedward were the guest judges.

Draw	Artist	Song	Result
01	Hannah McNicholas Roche	"Titim as a Chéile"	Final Duel
02	Susie Power	"Popsicle"	Eliminated
03	Walter McCabe	"Las Do Sholas"	Final Duel
04	Bernadette Royo	"Bean si"	Eliminated
05	Molly McCarthy	"Imithe Leis An Ghaoth"	Eliminated
06	Cathal Gavin	"Seo hé Mo Ghlór"	Eliminated
07	Amy Meehan	"Tapaigh An Deis"	Eliminated
08	Jael Katebe-Wini	"An Ghrá i do Chroí"	Eliminated

Hannah McNicholas Roche and Walter McCabe both advanced to the final duel stage and performed their songs for the second time. After their second performances, the jury members selected Walter McCabe as the winner of semi-final 1 and advances to the grand final on 6 November 2016.

=== Semi-final 2 ===
The second semi-final took place on 16 October 2016, in which Dustin the Turkey was the guest judge.

Draw	Artist	Song	Result
01	Zena Donnelly	"Bríce Ar Bhríce"	Final Duel
02	Taylor Hynes	"Níos Airde"	Eliminated
03	Maggie-Sue McCormack	"Tusa"	Eliminated
04	Natalie Hurley	"Mo chuid 'Superstars'"	Eliminated
05	Daniel Gallagher	"Táim Beo"	Final Duel
06	Holly Sturton	"A Cheol, Is Tusa M’Anamchara"	Eliminated
07	Ciara Mullarkey	"An Ghealach"	Eliminated
08	Leah Cunningham	"Saol Iontach"	Eliminated

Zena Donnelly and Daniel Gallagher advanced to the final duel where they performed their songs a second time. After their second performances, Donnelly was selected by the jury to advance to the final.

=== Semi-final 3 ===
The third semi-final took place on 23 October 2016, in which Sandie Jones was the guest judge.

Draw	Artist	Song	Result
01	Lillie Foley	"Am"	Eliminated
02	Rachel Haughney	"Na Réaltaí sa Spéir"	Final Duel
03	Roman O'Mahony	"Saoirse"	Eliminated
04	Rosalind Hayes	"Cé hIad na Laochra Anois?"	Eliminated
05	Éabha Ní Shúilleabháin	"Mo Laoch"	Eliminated
06	Cliona NicDhomnail	"Ag Seasamh Le Mo Réaltai"	Final Duel
07	Na Deirfiúracha Drumgoole	"Ceol an Easa"	Eliminated
08	Disha Suresh Kumar	"Níl Éinne Foirfe"	Eliminated

Rachel Haughney and Cliona NicDhomnail advanced to the final duel where they performed their songs the second time. After their second performances, NicDhomnail was selected by the jury to advance to the final.

=== Semi-final 4 ===
The fourth semi-final took place on 30 October 2016, in which Niamh Kavanagh was the guest judge.

Draw	Artist	Song	Result
01	Lasairfhíona de Brún	"Fan Liom"	Final Duel
02	Danny McGahey	"Marú na hOíche"	Eliminated
03	Eva Kavanagh	"Irrus Domnann"	Eliminated
04	Amy McGrath	"M'Aingeal"	Final Duel
05	Stephanie Byrne	"Go dti an Ghealach"	Eliminated
06	Lucy Hood	"Dathanna den Nadúr"	Eliminated
07	Ash & Jen	"Mo Chailíni"	Eliminated
08	Arabella Dolan	"Ag Seoladh Mo Ghrá Chugat"	Eliminated

Lasairfhíona de Brún and Amy McGrath advanced to the final duel where they performed their songs a second time. After their second performances, McGrath was selected by the jury to advance to the final.

=== Final ===
The grand final took place on 6 November 2016, in which Linda Martin was the guest judge. Two wildcard acts were entered into the final. They were Hannah McNicholas Roche who came second in week 1 and Lasairfhíona de Brún who came second in week 4.

Draw	Artist	Song	Result
01	Zena Donnelly	"Brice ar Bhrice"	Final Duel
02	Walter McCabe	"Las Do Sholas"	Eliminated
03	Hannah McNicholas Roche	"Titim as a Chéile”	Eliminated
04	Cliona NicDhomnail	"Ag Seasamh Le Mo Réaltai"	Eliminated
05	Amy McGrath	"M'Aingeal"	Final Duel
06	Lasairfhíona de Brún	"Fan Liom"	Eliminated

==== Final Duel ====
For the final, a sing-off was introduced between the top two contenders.

Draw	Artist	Song	Result
01	Zena Donnelly	"Brice ar Bhrice"	Winner
02	Amy McGrath	"M'Aingeal"	Runner-up

== Artist and song information ==
(Republic of Ireland) "Bríce ar Bhríce"
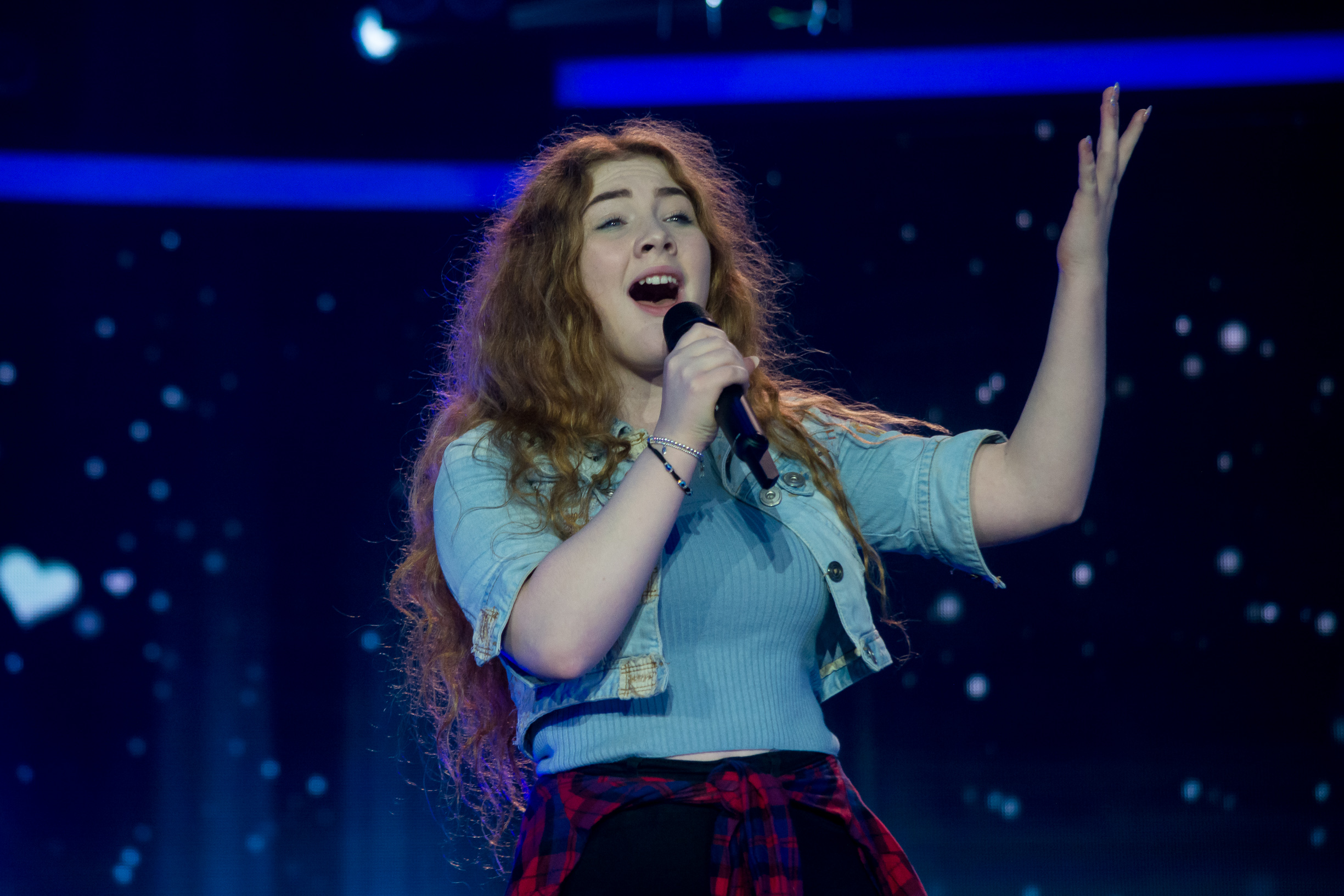

Junior Eurovision Song Contest 2016 entry
- Country: Ireland
- Artist: Zena Donnelly
- Languages: Irish, English
- Composer: Zena Donnelly
- Lyricist: Zena Donnelly

Entry chronology
- ◄ "Réalta na mara (Star of the sea)" (2015)
- "Súile Glasa" (2017) ►

=== Zena Donnelly ===
Zena Donnelly
- Born: 28 August 2002 (age 24); Blackrock, Dublin, Ireland
- Genres: Pop; R&B
- Occupation: Singer
- Instrument: Vocals
- Years active: 2009–present

Zena Donnelly (born 28 August 2002) is an Irish singer and actress. She represented Ireland at the Junior Eurovision Song Contest 2016 in Valletta, Malta on 20 November 2016 with the song "Bríce ar Bhríce".

Zena has won RTÉ's nationwide TV talent competition Show Off or Get Off, performed for Music Inc., and played the lead role in Annie at the National Concert Hall. Zena was a special young guest at the Cheerios ChildLine Concert in the 3Arena alongside other artists including Olly Murs, Boyzone and McBusted. Zena also took part in Junior Eurovision Éire in 2015, coming second to Aimee Banks.

Branching out from music, Zena has started to be cast in films such as Céad Ghrá, Cuckoo, Winnie-the-Pooh: Blood and Honey 3 – The Lost Years and A Christmas Star, where she also sings, among others, the theme song, "We Can Shine".

In 2017, Zena took part in series 1 of The Voice Kids, where she was placed in judge Pixie Lott's team.

=== Bríce ar Bhríce ===
"Bríce ar Bhríce" (English translation: "Brick by brick") is a song written and recorded by Irish singer Zena Donnelly. It represented Ireland during the Junior Eurovision Song Contest 2016, placing tenth out of seventeen contestants.

== At Junior Eurovision ==
During the opening ceremony and the running order draw which took place on 14 November 2016, Ireland was drawn to open the show on 20 November 2016, preceding Armenia.

The final was broadcast in Ireland on TG4. However it was announced on 16 November 2016 by the broadcaster that the show would not be broadcast live but that the show would be broadcast 3 hours and 30 minutes after it aired in Malta.

=== Final ===
Zena delivered a strong series of run-throughs of her mid-tempo song against a visually stunning backdrop of the night sky.

=== Voting ===
During the press conference for the Junior Eurovision Song Contest 2016, held in Stockholm, the Reference Group announced several changes to the voting format for the 2016 contest. Previously, points had been awarded based on a combination of 50% National juries and 50% televoting, with one more set of points also given out by a 'Kids' Jury'. However, this year, points were awarded based on a 50/50 combination of each country's Adult and Kids' Jury, to be announced by a spokesperson. For the first time since the inauguration of the contest the voting procedure did not include a public televote. Following these results, three expert jurors also announced their points from 1–8, 10, and 12. These professional jurors are: Christer Björkman, Mads Grimstad, and Jedward.

At the end of the voting, Ireland placed 10th with 122 points, receiving 65 points from the adult jury and 57 from the kids jury. Ireland received 2 sets of 12 points, from Italy and Malta.

Points awarded to Ireland
Score	Adult and expert juries	Kids juries
12 points	Italy; Malta	
10 points	Ukraine	Malta
8 points	Australia	Albania; Italy
7 points		Poland; Ukraine
6 points	Serbia	Australia
5 points	Jedward	Cyprus
4 points	Mads Grimstad	
3 points	Bulgaria; Cyprus	
2 points		Belarus; Netherlands
1 point	Albania; Russia	Israel; Russia

Points awarded by Ireland
Score	Adult jury	Kids jury
12 points	Georgia	Australia
10 points	Italy	Italy
8 points	Belarus	Russia
7 points	Russia	Armenia
6 points	Netherlands	Bulgaria
5 points	Australia	Malta
4 points	Armenia	Netherlands
3 points	Bulgaria	Georgia
2 points	Cyprus	Cyprus
1 point	Malta	Israel
