= Albania in the Junior Eurovision Song Contest 2016 =

- Junior Eurovision Song Contest 2016
- Country: Albania
- Selection process: Festivali 53 i Këngës për Fëmijë
- Selection date: 1 June 2016

Competing entry
- Song: "Besoj"
- Artist: Klesta Qehaja
- Songwriters: Adrian Hila; Pandi Laço

Placement
- Final result: 13th, 38 points

Participation chronology

Albania was represented at the Junior Eurovision Song Contest 2016 with the song "Besoj" written by Adrian Hila and Pandi Laço. The song was performed by Klesta Quehaja. The Albanian entry for the 2016 contest in Valletta, Malta was selected through a national final organised by the Albanian broadcaster Radio Televizioni Shqiptar (RTSH). The national final consisted of fourteen competing acts participating in a televised production where the winner was determined by 100% votes of jury members made up of music professionals. Klesta Qehaja won the Festivali 53 i Këngës për Fëmijë with the song "Besoj", on 1 June 2016.

== Background ==
Prior to the 2016 Contest, Albania had participated in the Junior Eurovision Song Contest two times since its first entry in 2012, only opting not to participate at the 2013 and 2014 contests. Albania has never won the contest, with their best result being in 2015, with the song "Dambaje" performed by Mishela Rapo, achieving fifth place with a score of 93 points.

== Before Junior Eurovision ==
=== National final ===
The national final, Festivali 53 i Këngës për Fëmijë, took place on 1 June 2016. The national final consisted of fourteen competing acts participating in a televised production where the winner was determined by 100% votes of jury members made up of music professionals.

Draw	Artist	Song	Language	English translation	Place
1	Zhaklina Veizaj	"Botë mirësie kërkoj"	Albanian	The World Kindly Asks	
2	Dario Zela	"We Need Love"	Albanian, English	—	
3	Rajan Kukaleshi	"Vetëm nuk je"	Albanian	You're Not Alone	
4	Jasmina Hako	"Si fluturim"	Albanian	Like Flying	2
5	Michelle Prodani	"Prindër"	Albanian	Parents	
6	Xhesika Pengili	"Largoje trishtimin"	Albanian	Remove the Sorrow	
7	Marko Strazimiri	"Music Makes My Day"	Albanian, English	—	3
8	Vivian Biaxhorni & Xhamerino Bollati	"Në mes yjesh"	Albanian	Between the Stars	
9	Endi Muça	"Dua të jem"	Albanian	I Want To Be	
10	Klesta Qehaja	"Besoj"	Albanian	I Believe	1
11	Klea Mema	"Dua të jem e lirë"	Albanian	I Want To Be Free	
12	Eda Muça	"Lulja që më dhurove"	Albanian	The Flower You Gave	
13	Dea Çobo	"Mirë se erdhe flutur"	Albanian	Welcome Butterfly	
14	Vivian Kokeri	"Portat e gëzimit"	Albanian	Gates of joy	

==== Jury members ====
The jury members were as follows (in alphabetical order):

- Adelina Mamaqi
- Aleksandër Lalo
- Era Rusi
- Gordon Bonello
- Irma Libohova
- Martin Leka
- Olga Salamakha

=== Preparation ===
The video and new version of the "Besoj" were premiered on 7 November 2016.

== Artist and song information ==
Klesta Qehaja
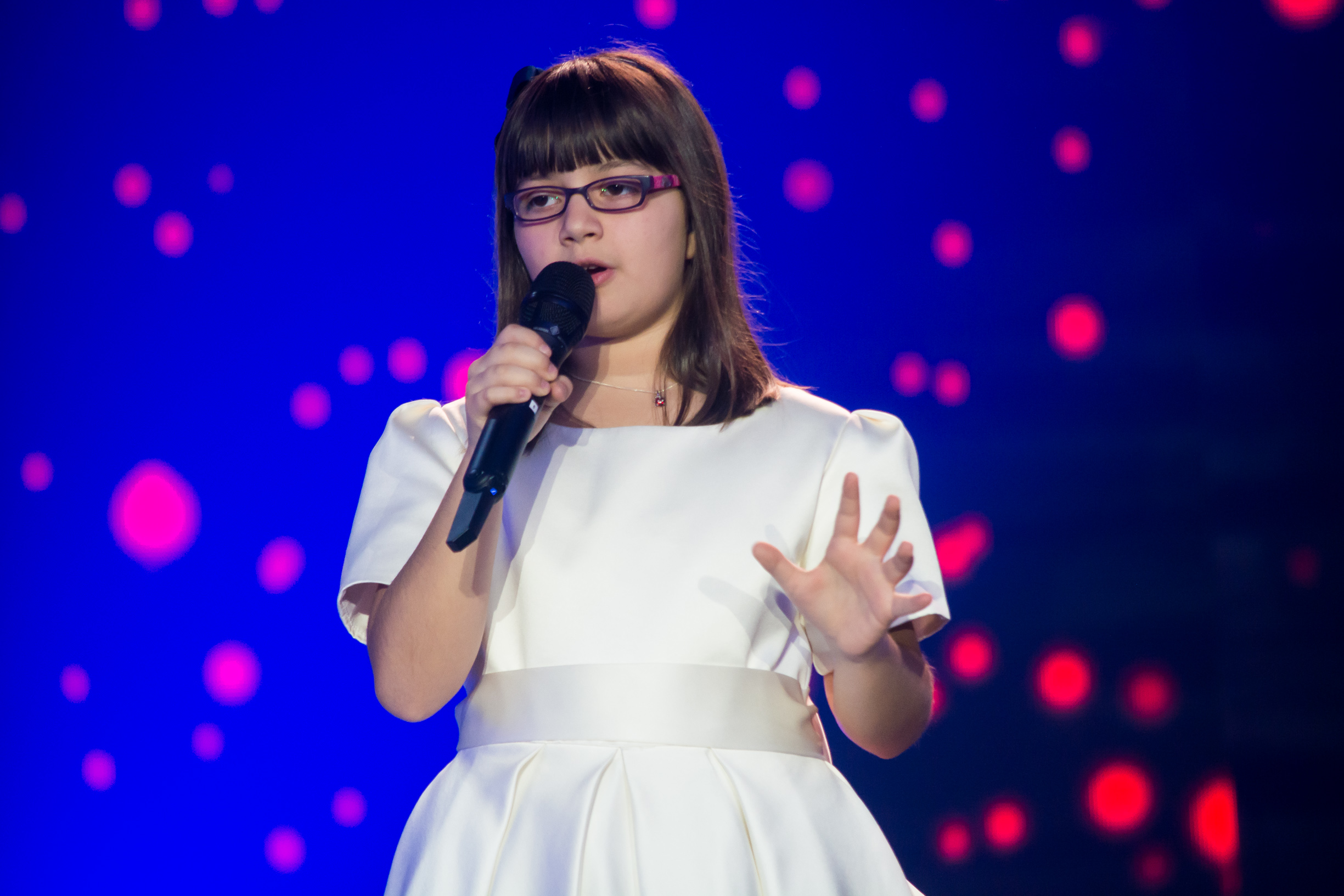

Background information
- Born: Klesta Qehaja; 18 August 2006 (age 19); Pristina, United Nations Administered Kosovo (present-day Kosovo)
- Occupation: Singer
- Instrument: Vocals

=== Klesta Qehaja ===
Klesta Qehaja (born 18 August 2006) is a Kosovo-Albanian singer. She represented Albania with the song "Besoj", at the Junior Eurovision Song Contest 2016 in Valletta, Malta on 20 November 2016.

Prior to the Junior Eurovision Song Contest, Qehaja had participated in multiple contests such as Gjeniu i Vogël in Albania, Shining Star in Turkey, Bled Golden Microphone in Serbia, and most notably winning first prize in the Pristina Kids Fest.

=== Besoj ===
"Besoj" (English translation: "I Believe") is a song performed by Albanian child singer Klesta Qehaja. It represented Albania during the Junior Eurovision Song Contest 2016. It is composed and written by Adrian Hila and Pandi Laço who also composed and wrote the previous Albanian entry "Dambaje".

== At Junior Eurovision ==
During the opening ceremony and the running order draw which took place on 14 November 2016, Albania was drawn to perform third on 20 November 2016, following Armenia and preceding Russia.

The final will be broadcast in Albania on TVSH, RTSH Muzikë and Radio Tirana with commentary by Andri Xhahu.

=== Final ===
Klesta was wearing a white dress with a satin belt, bow in the back and lace on the edge of the dress. She stood in the middle of the stage with a microphone in her right hand and with her left hand she was making discrete movements. The backdrop shifted in black, white and red, without any other props on stage.

=== Voting ===
During the press conference for the Junior Eurovision Song Contest 2016, held in Stockholm, the Reference Group announced several changes to the voting format for the 2016 contest. Previously, points had been awarded based on a combination of 50% National juries and 50% televoting, with one more set of points also given out by a 'Kids' Jury'. However, this year, points will be awarded based on a 50/50 combination of each country's Adult and Kids' Jury, to be announced by a spokesperson. For the first time since the inauguration of the contest the voting procedure will not include a public televote. Following these results, three expert jurors will also announce their points from 1–8, 10, and 12. These professional jurors are: Christer Björkman, Mads Grimstad, and Jedward.

Points awarded to Albania
Score	Adult and expert juries	Kids juries
12 points		
12 points		
12 points		
7 points	Serbia	
6 points		
5 points	Italy	
4 points	Malta	Armenia; Poland
3 points		
2 points	Belarus; Christer Björkman; Cyprus; Russia	Australia
1 point	Australia	Macedonia; Netherlands; Ukraine

Points awarded by Albania
Score	Adult jury	Kids jury
12 points	Georgia	Malta
10 points	Australia	Italy
8 points	Italy	Ireland
7 points	Malta	Macedonia
6 points	Bulgaria	Armenia
5 points	Netherlands	Bulgaria
4 points	Russia	Georgia
3 points	Israel	Israel
2 points	Macedonia	Australia
1 point	Ireland	Poland
