= Russia in the Junior Eurovision Song Contest 2016 =

- Junior Eurovision Song Contest 2016
- Country: Russia
- Selection process: Song: National final Artist: Internal selection
- Selection date: Song: 16 August 2016 Artist: 6 October 2016

Competing entry
- Song: "Water of Life"
- Artist: Water of Life Project
- Songwriters: Rita Dakota

Placement
- Final result: 4th, 202 points

Participation chronology

Russia was represented at the Junior Eurovision Song Contest 2016 which took place on 20 November 2016, in Valletta, Malta. The Russian broadcaster Russia-1, owned by the All-Russia State Television and Radio Broadcasting Company (VGTRK) was responsible for organising their entry for the contest. Sofia Fisenko won the national final on 16 August 2016 with the song "Zhivaya voda" (Russian: Живая Вода). On 6 October, the Russian organisation team opted to change the name of the entrant to Water of Life Project, with the song also changing to "Water of Life".

== Background ==
Prior to the 2016 Contest, Russia had participated in the Junior Eurovision Song Contest eleven times since its debut in 2005. Russia have participated at ever contest since its debut, and have won the contest once in 2006 with the song "Vesenniy Jazz", performed by Tolmachevy Twins. The twin sisters went on to become one of the first acts (Nevena Božović was the first) from a Junior Eurovision Song Contest to represent their country at the Eurovision Song Contest, performing the song "Shine" at the Eurovision Song Contest 2014, in Copenhagen, Denmark.

== Before Junior Eurovision ==
=== National final ===
The Russian broadcaster, Russia-1, announced on 29 April 2016 that they would be participating at the 2016 Contest, taking place in Valletta, Malta, on 20 November 2016. At the time of the announcement, it was also stated that the national final would take place in the city of Sochi, which had also hosted the 2014 Winter Olympics. The choice of the host city was later changed following an announcement on 27 May 2016, when further details regarding the mechanism for the selection process were released. Submissions for entrants were open between 30 May to 15 July, with the audition stage taking place in the Russian capital, Moscow on 20 July 2016. Russia-1 announced on 21 July 2016 that a total of sixteen artists would be competing in the national final.

==== Final ====
The national selection took place on 15 August 2016, in Artek, Crimea, and was televised a day later on 16 August 2016. The result was determined by a voting split of 50% jury members and 50% online voting. The table below lists the sixteen young artists along with their respective songs, which were performed during a televised broadcast on 16 August 2016. 14-year-old Sofia Fisenko won the national final with the song "Zhivaya voda". Previously, Fisenko placed third at the 2013 national final.

Final – 16 August 2016
Draw	Artist	Song	Bonus	Jury	Online Vote		Total	Place
Draw	Artist	Song	Bonus	Jury	Votes	Points	Total	Place
1	Yuliya Asessorova	"Ya Ne Boyus" (Я Не Боюсь)	12	6	19,293	6	24	4
2	Lilya Verdiyan	"Tantsuy So Mnoy Bystreye" (Танцуй Со Мной Быстрее)	12	5	5,620	1	18	8
3	Sofia Pastushkova	"Pover v Sebya" (Поверь в Себя)	12	0	1,122	0	12	15
4	Sofia Fisenko	"Zhivaya Voda" (Живая Вода)	12	12	22,495	12	36	1
5	Alexey Zabugin	"Rozhyonniye Pod Solntsem" (Рождённые Под Солнцем)	12	8	3,693	0	20	6
6	Duet "Friends"	"Derzhi Menya Za Ruku" (Держи Меня За Руку)	12	4	21,561	10	26	3
7	Katya Maneshina	"Lyubov Spasyot Etot Mir" (Любовь Спасёт Этот Мир)	12	7	3,836	0	19	7
8	Maria Mirova	"Padayem i Vzletayem" (Падаем и Взлетаем)	12	10	20,256	7	29	2
9	Alisa Khilko	"Golovolomki" (Головоломки)	12	0	9,321	4	16	10
10	Milana Pavlova	"Navsegda Veryu" (Навсегда Верю)	12	0	7,752	2	14	12
11	Chto Skazhut Deti	"Bit Nashego Serdtsa" (Бит Нашего Сердца)	12	0	8,237	3	15	11
12	Maria Zhuravleva	"Nauchu Mechtat" (Научу Мечтать)	12	3	21,536	8	23	5
13	Zhara	"Papochka, Kupi Gitaru" (Папочка, Купи Гитару)	12	0	1,124	0	12	16
14	Liza Kuznetsova	"Prisnilos" (Приснилось)	12	2	1,807	0	14	12
15	Milana Zharekhina	"Oglyanites" (Оглянитесь)	12	1	4,661	0	13	14
16	Vilena Hikmatullina	"Nado Kruzhit" (Надо Кружить)	12	0	12,576	5	17	9

=== Artist change ===
On 6 October 2016, the Russian organisation team announced that Sofia Fisenko would now perform her winning entry along with Aleksandra Abrameytseva, Kristina Abramova and Madonna Abramova under the stage name Water of Life Project, with the title of the song "Zhivaya voda" (Russian: Живая Вода) also changing to "Water of Life", gaining an English final chorus. Carousel later reported Sofia Fisenko herself initiated the proposal to create The Water of Life Project, stating: "I sang and saw the eyes of all the children in the hall, my close friends sang along with me in the front row, and then I clearly realized that the "Water of Life" is us, the children, this is the energy and strength that spills with our voices around the planet. I believe that with this power, purity, we can change a lot".

== Artist and song information ==
(Russia) "Water Of Life"
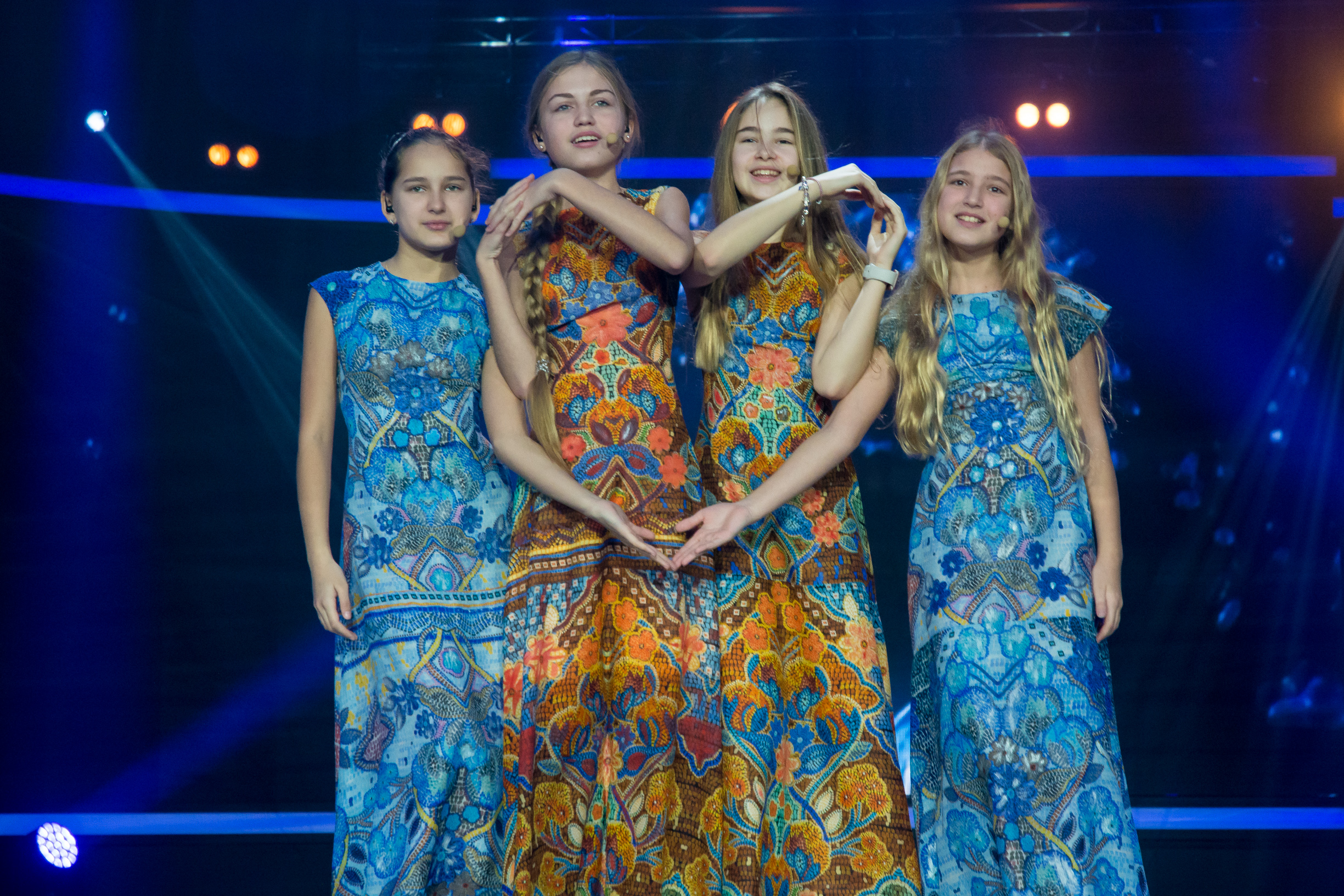

Junior Eurovision Song Contest 2016 entry
- Country: Russia
- Artists: Sofia Fisenko; Aleksandra Abrameytseva; Kristina Abramova; Madonna Abramova
- As: The Water of Life Project
- Languages: Russian, English
- Composer: Rita Dakota
- Lyricist: Rita Dakota

Entry chronology
- ◄ "Mechta (Dream)" (2015)
- "Krylya" (2017) ►

=== The Water of Life Project ===
The Water of Life Project is a group created specifically for the 2016 Junior Eurovision Song Contest. It consists of 4 girls - Sofia Fisenko, Sasha Abrameytseva and sisters Christina and Madonna Abramova.

Sofia Fisenko was born on 13 June 2002 (age 24) in the city of Novomoskovsk, in the Tula region of Russia. From her early childhood she practiced choreography although she prefers singing to dancing. When Sofia was six, she started studying music and graduated with her first professional diploma in 2016. When she was 11 years old, she decided to learn to play the flute, something that she continues today. In 2013, she took part in the Russian national selection for the Junior Eurovision Song Contest with the song "Best Friends" where she finish third.

Since 2015, Sofia has been a student at the Popular Music Academy of Igor Krutoy. She participates in all the events and concerts, takes classes from the academy teachers. Sofia's dream is to become successful in her future career. She wants to become the leader of a large charitable foundation, help children or become a professional journalist.

Alongside lead vocalist Sofia, Sasha Abrameytseva and sisters Christina and Madonna Abramova also form the Water of Life Project.

Sasha is 13 years old and has already taken part in many international competitions and her original songs regularly broadcast on Russian television.

Madonna and Christina are siblings, Madonna is 11 and Christina is 13 years old. The girls have been studying music since they were 5. Their parents were the first to recognize their vocal talent and they supported and inspired them in their pursuit to study the art of singing.

=== Water of Life ===
"Water of Life" is a song by Russian group "The Water of Life Project". It represented Russia during the Junior Eurovision Song Contest 2016. It is composed and written by Rita Dakota and Sofia herself.

== At Junior Eurovision ==
During the opening ceremony and the running order draw which took place on 14 November 2016, Russia was drawn to perform fourth on 20 November 2016, following Albania and preceding Malta.

The final was broadcast in Russia on Karousel.

=== Final ===
The girls used headset mics and started off on the floor before sitting up and launching into a polished routine, which had hints of an interpretive dance. The girls were wearing long flowing dresses with pattern details - two blue and two orange. Towards the end of the song, the chorus switched to English, whilst the backdrop featured droplets of water, which was in keeping with the theme of the song.

=== Voting ===
During the press conference for the Junior Eurovision Song Contest 2016, held in Stockholm, the Reference Group announced several changes to the voting format for the 2016 contest. Previously, points had been awarded based on a combination of 50% National juries and 50% televoting, with one more set of points also given out by a 'Kids' Jury'. However, this year, points will be awarded based on a 50/50 combination of each country's Adult and Kids' Jury, to be announced by a spokesperson. For the first time since the inauguration of the contest the voting procedure will not include a public televote. Following these results, three expert jurors will also announce their points from 1–8, 10, and 12. These professional jurors are: Christer Björkman, Mads Grimstad, and Jedward.

Points awarded to Russia
Score	Adult and expert juries	Kids juries
12 points	Jedward	Macedonia; Serbia
10 points	Mads Grimstad	Belarus; Bulgaria; Netherlands
8 points	Macedonia	Ireland; Ukraine
7 points	Belarus; Christer Björkman; Ireland; Poland	
6 points	Armenia	Cyprus; Georgia; Israel; Italy; Poland
5 points	Israel; Serbia	
4 points	Albania; Cyprus; Ukraine	
3 points	Georgia; Netherlands	Armenia
2 points	Australia; Italy	Malta
1 point	Bulgaria	

Points awarded by Russia
Score	Adult jury	Kids jury
12 points	Belarus	Belarus
10 points	Georgia	Armenia
8 points	Netherlands	Malta
7 points	Armenia	Australia
6 points	Australia	Netherlands
5 points	Italy	Cyprus
4 points	Poland	Georgia
3 points	Malta	Bulgaria
2 points	Albania	Italy
1 point	Ireland	Ireland
