= Netherlands in the Junior Eurovision Song Contest 2016 =

2016 Junior Eurovision participation

- Junior Eurovision Song Contest 2016
- Country: Netherlands
- Selection process: Internal selection
- Announcement date: Artist: 27 May 2016; Song: 1 October 2016

Competing entry
- Song: "Kisses and Dancin'"
- Artist: Kisses
- Songwriters: Joost Griffioen; Stas Swaczyna; Hansen Tomas

Placement
- Final result: 8th, 174 points

Participation chronology

The Netherlands was represented at the Junior Eurovision Song Contest 2016 which took place in Valletta, Malta on 20 November 2016. The Dutch broadcaster AVROTROS, was responsible for the organisation of their representative at the contest. The band Kisses, a trio consisting of three girls: Kymora, Stefania and Sterre, were chosen internally by the Dutch broadcaster on 27 May 2016. Kisses performed their song "Kisses and Dancin'".

== Background ==
Prior to the 2016 Contest, the Netherlands had participated in the Junior Eurovision Song Contest thirteen times since its first entry in 2003. The Netherlands has won the contest on one occasion: in 2009 with the song "Click Clack" performed by Ralf Mackenbach. In 2015 the Netherlands placed 15th out of 17 entries with the song "Million Lights" performed by Shalisa.

== Before Junior Eurovision ==
On 27 May 2016, the Dutch girl group Kisses, consisting of Kymora, Stefania and Sterre was internally selected to represent the Netherlands at the 2016 contest in Valletta, Malta by AVROTROS among 29 young artists and 8 finalists after two auditions, held on 21 and 22 May. Their song for the contest, "Kisses and Dancin'", was presented on 1 October 2016. The song was composed and written by Joost Griffioen, Stas Swaczyna and Hansen Tomas. Kisses consisted of three members: Stefania, Kymora and Sterre. Kymora Sade (born 6 June 2004) grew up speaking two languages, German and Dutch, because her mother is German. Stefania Liberakakis (born 17 December 2002) is from an originally Greek family that settled in Utrecht, and grew up speaking both Dutch and Greek. Before she auditioned for Junior Songfestival, she competed in The Voice Kids and sang in the Dutch children's choir Kinderen voor Kinderen alongside fellow Kisses member Sterre. They performed twice for the royal family as part of this choir. Sterre Koning (born 23 January 2003) had experience as a singer and as an actress in TV commercials. She was part of JEANS TeenZ, a group of teens that performed in theatres.

== At Junior Eurovision ==
During the opening ceremony and the running order draw, which took place on 14 November 2016, the Netherlands was drawn to perform fifteenth on 20 November 2016, following Australia and preceding Cyprus.

The final was broadcast in the Netherlands on NPO 3 with commentary by Jan Smit.

=== Voting ===
During the press conference for the Junior Eurovision Song Contest 2016, held in Stockholm, the Reference Group announced several changes to the voting format for the 2016 contest. Previously, points had been awarded based on a combination of 50% National juries and 50% televoting, with one more set of points also given out by a 'Kids' Jury'. However, this year, points will be awarded based on a 50/50 combination of each country's Adult and Kids' Jury, to be announced by a spokesperson. For the first time since the inauguration of the contest the voting procedure will not include a public televote. Following these results, three expert jurors will also announce their points from 1–8, 10, and 12. These professional jurors are: Christer Björkman, Mads Grimstad, and Jedward.

Points awarded to the Netherlands
Score	Adult and expert juries	Kids juries
12 points		Georgia; Israel
10 points	Armenia; Georgia	Ukraine
8 points	Jedward; Russia; Ukraine	
7 points	Bulgaria; Malta	Armenia
6 points	Cyprus; Ireland; Israel	Malta; Russia
5 points	Albania	
4 points	Christer Björkman; Italy; Macedonia; Serbia	Ireland; Macedonia
3 points	Australia; Belarus; Mads Grimstad; Poland	
2 points		Serbia
1 point		Bulgaria; Cyprus

Points awarded by the Netherlands
Score	Adult jury	Kids jury
12 points	Georgia	Australia
10 points	Belarus	Russia
8 points	Italy	Macedonia
7 points	Armenia	Bulgaria
6 points	Bulgaria	Armenia
5 points	Cyprus	Georgia
4 points	Australia	Italy
3 points	Russia	Malta
2 points	Macedonia	Ireland
1 point	Ukraine	Albania
