= Bulgaria in the Junior Eurovision Song Contest 2016 =

- Junior Eurovision Song Contest 2016
- Country: Bulgaria
- Selection process: Artist: Decata na Bulgaria sa super; Song: Internal selection
- Selection date: Decata na Bulgaria sa super: Semi-finals: 2 June 2016; 8 June 2016; Final: 11 June 2016; Song selection: 2 October 2016

Competing entry
- Song: "Magical Day (Valsheben den)"
- Artist: Lidia Ganeva
- Songwriters: Vladimir Ampov (Grafa); Iliya Grigorov

Placement
- Final result: 9th, 161 points

Participation chronology

Bulgaria was represented at the Junior Eurovision Song Contest 2016. Their entrant was selected through the televised national selection "Decata na Bulgaria sa super", organised by the Bulgarian broadcaster Bulgarian National Television (BNT). Lidia Ganeva won the national selection and she got the right to represent Bulgaria in the contest. Ganeva performed the song "Magical Day (Valsheben den)" at the contest.

In the final, Bulgaria performed in position 6 and placed 9th out of the 17 participating countries, scoring 161 points.

== Before Junior Eurovision ==
=== Decata na Bulgaria sa super ===
The singer who performed the Bulgarian entry for the Junior Eurovision Song Contest 2016 was selected through the reality singing competition Decata na Bulgaria sa super ("The children of Bulgaria are awesome"). Bulgarian broadcaster BNT opened submissions for singers aged between 9–14 to send their audio or video recordings to the BNT team. After the deadline on 10 May 2016, a professional jury of music experts selected the best ones to proceed to the first semi-final of the televised national selection. The process to select the representative began on 2 June 2016 and it ended on 8 June 2016. The selection procedure included two semi-finals and a final. A total of fifteen stars were internally selected to compete at the first semi-final where a professional jury selected five finalists out of fifteen. During the first semi-final, eleven singers out of fifteen qualified for the next one, where five singers advanced for the final. The results in the two semi-finals were to be based on 100% jury votes, while in the final the winner was selected by a 50/50 combination of both telephone vote and the votes of jury members. The jury consisted of:

- Borislav Milanov
- Nora Karaivanova
- Vladimir Ampov "Grafa"
- Teddy Katzarova
- Vencislav Roland "VenZy"
- Gordon Bonello (only in the final)

==== Semi-final 1 ====
The first semi-final took place on 2 June 2016. All the fifteen acts had to sing a song in Bulgarian. The performances were either covers of popular Bulgarian songs or songs written for the performer. The same song was allowed to be performed by more than one of the singers. The five-person professional jury chose eleven singers to qualify for the second semi-final.

Draw	Artist	Song (original artist)	Vocals	Stage presence	Total	Place
1	Valentina Kuncheva	"Visoko" (FSB)	28.00	27.00	55.00	7
2	Daniela Piryankova	"Kopnezh" (Margarita Hranova)	27.25	22.00	49.25	15
3	Dimitrina Germanova	"Dve" (Poli Genova)	28.00	26.00	54.00	10
4	Valentina Nikova	"Iskam te" (Lili Ivanova)	28.50	26.00	54.50	9
5	Lidia Ganeva	"Rapsodia" (Roberta)	30.00	30.00	60.00	1
6	Gergana Todorova	"Povey, vetre" (Pasha Hristova)	29.50	28.00	57.50	5
7	Simona Krusteva	"Ustrem" (Margatita Hranova)	28.00	26.00	54.00	10
8	Aleksandar Petrov	"Davam vsichko za teb" (Grafa)	27.00	25.00	52.00	14
9	Bozhena Vurbanova	"Dushata mi e ston" (Georgi Hristov)	28.00	25.00	53.00	12
10	Preslava Petrova	"Mechta" (Preslava Petrova)	29.00	28.00	57.00	6
11	Eleonora Dimtrova	"Kopnezh" (Margarita Hranova)	29.00	29.00	58.00	4
12	Nia Krusheva	"Ne taka" (Margarita Hranova)	26.75	28.00	54.75	8
13	Bon-Bon	"Na inat" (Poli Genova)	29.75	30.00	59.75	2
14	Sesil Sabri	"Pticata" (Lili Ivanova)	27.50	25.00	52.50	13
15	Eleonora Ivanova	"Neka sme razlichni" (Roberta)	28.75	30.00	58.75	3

==== Semi-final 2 ====
The second semi-final took place on 8 June 2016. All of the eleven acts had to sing covers of well-known international hits. The five-person professional jury selected five singers to qualify for the final on 11 June 2016.

Draw	Artist	Song (original artist)	Vocals	Stage presence	Total	Place
1	Gergana Todorova	"Fighter" (Christina Aguilera)	27.75	28.50	56.25	10
2	Eleonora Dimitrova	"I Surrender" (Celine Dion)	29.50	27.75	57.25	9
3	Valentina Kuncheva	"Stone Cold" (Demi Lovato)	29.25	28.75	58.00	7
4	Nia Krusheva	"Hallelujah" (Leonard Cohen)	26.00	26.50	52.50	11
5	Valentina Nikova	"Little secret" (Nikki Yanofsky)	28.25	29.50	57.75	8
6	Preslava Petrova	"I Have Nothing" (Whitney Houston)	29.50	29.00	58.50	5
7	Eleonora Ivanova	"Not That Kind" (Anastacia)	28.75	29.50	58.25	6
8	Bon-Bon	"If Love Was a Crime" (Poli Genova)	29.00	30.00	59.00	4
9	Dimitrina Germanova	"Memory" (Barbra Streisand)	29.50	29.75	59.25	2
10	Lidia Ganeva	"Who's Lovin' You" (Michael Jackson)	30.00	30.00	60.00	1
11	Simona Krusteva	"Listen" (Beyoncé)	29.75	29.25	59.00	3

==== Final ====
The final took place on 11 June 2016. All five acts performed songs in two rounds. They had to sing a song of their own choice in the first round and a song in Bulgarian in the second round. The winner was selected by a 50/50 combination of both telephone vote and the votes of jury members.

Artist	Draw	Song (original artist)	Draw	Song (original artist)	Jury				Televoting				Total	Place
Artist	Draw	Song (original artist)	Draw	Song (original artist)	First round	Second Round	Total	Points	First round	Second Round	Total	Points	Total	Place
Preslava Petrova	1	"I Have Nothing" (Whitney Houston)	6	"Mechta" (Preslava Petrova)	28.00	28.75	56.75	4	7.67%	8.29%	7.98%	1	5	3
Simona Krusteva	2	"Something's Got a Hold on Me" (Etta James)	7	"Ustrem" (Margarita Hranova)	26.75	27.50	54.25	2	11.27%	7.86%	9.55%	2	4	5
Bon-Bon	3	"If Love Was a Crime" (Poli Genova)	8	"Na inat" (Poli Genova)	25.75	27.50	53.25	1	21.01%	17.88%	19.43%	3	4	4
Lidia Ganeva	4	"Who's Loving You" (Michael Jackson)	9	"Rapsodia" (Roberta)	30.00	30.00	60.00	5	31.38%	38.05%	34.75%	5	10	1
Dimitrina Germanova	5	"Memory" (Barbra Streisand)	10	"Dve" (Poli Genova)	27.00	28.25	55.25	3	28.67%	27.92%	28.29%	4	7	2

=== Song selection ===
BNT announced on 14 September 2016, that the song which will be performed by Ganeva in Malta will be entitled "Magical Day (Valsheben den)". On 15 September 2016, the 10-year-old singer from Plovdiv took part in special celebrations of the new school year in her hometown performing a short snippet of her song. The full version of "Magical Day (Valsheben den)" was premiered on 2 October 2016 during the show "The day starts on Sunday with Georgi Lyubenov" on BNT.

== Artist and song information ==
Lidia Ganeva
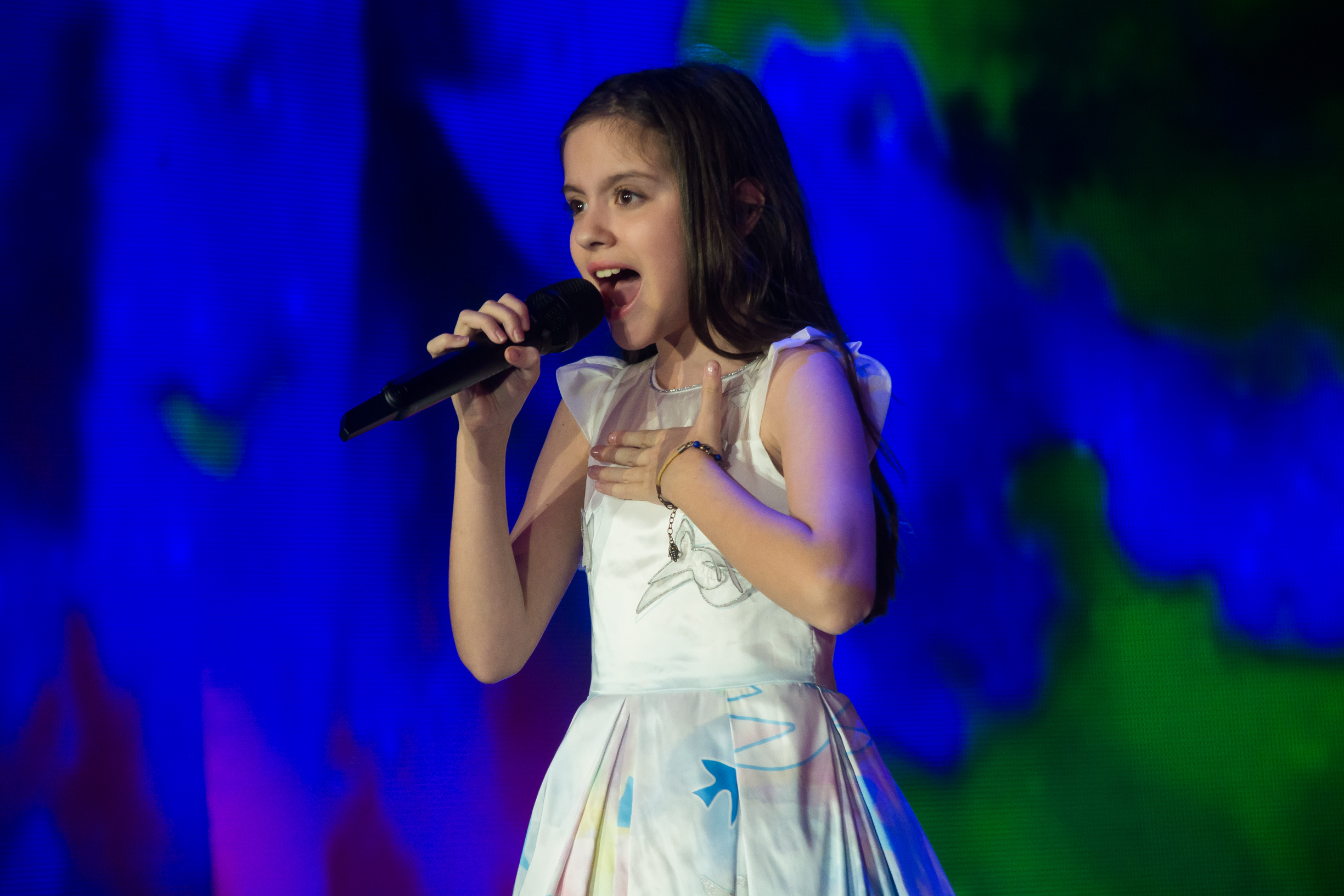

Background information
- Born: Lidia Ganeva; 2 February 2006 (age 19); Plovdiv, Bulgaria
- Occupations: Student and singer
- Instrument: Vocals

(Bulgaria) "Magical Day (Valsheben den)"
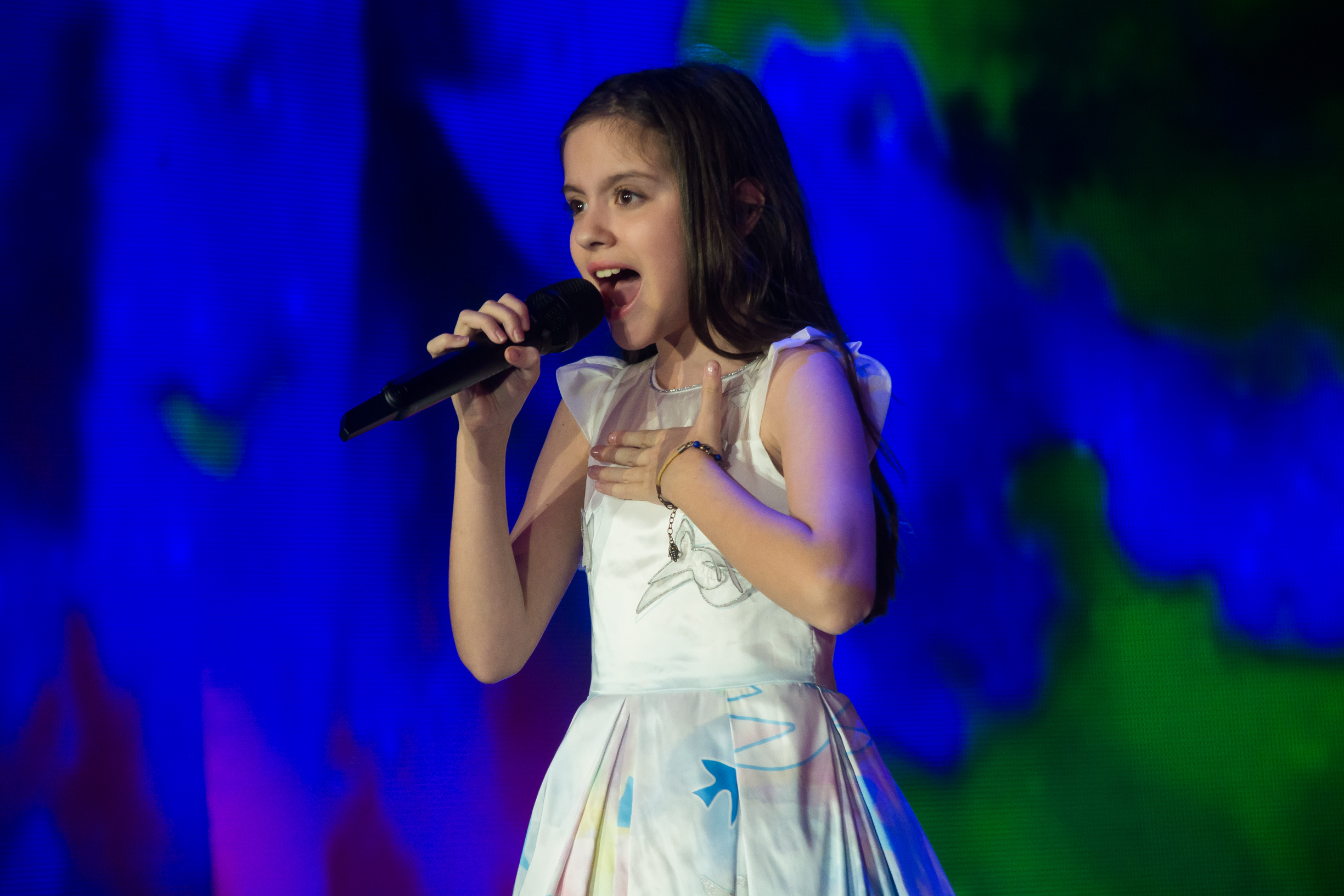

Junior Eurovision Song Contest 2016 entry
- Country: Bulgaria
- Artist: Lidia Ganeva
- Languages: Bulgarian, English
- Composer: Vladimir Ampov (Grafa)
- Lyricists: Vladimir Ampov (Grafa), Iliya Grigorov

Finals performance
- Final result: {{{place}}}
- Final points: 161

Entry chronology
- ◄ "Colour of Hope" (2015)

=== Lidia Ganeva ===
Lidia Ganeva (Bulgarian: Лидия Ганева) (born 2 February 2006) is a Bulgarian child singer. She represented Bulgaria at the Junior Eurovision Song Contest 2016 in Valletta, Malta on 20 November 2016 with the song "Magical Day (Valsheben den)".

Lidia was born in Plovdiv, the second-largest city in Bulgaria. She attended the Armenian school in her hometown and has been involved in music from a very early age; her parents are musicians with Bulgaria's famous folk ensemble, Trakiya. Lidia often accompanied her parents during their stage performances and they said that Lidia could sing before she could speak, often repeating phrases from children's songs that her mother sang to her.

Lidia participated in her first musical competition when she was four years old, the youngest participant to win a prize. At six she joined the "Art Voice Centre" music school. With Rumi Ivanova as her singing teacher, Lidia won a total of 22 first, 4-second and 2 third prizes in national and international festivals.

In June 2016, Lidia won Bulgaria's national selection for Junior Eurovision 2016 in Malta, receiving the highest score in the competition from viewers and the jury. "Magical Day (Valsheben den)" was written by Vladimir "Grafa" Ampov, one of the most popular Bulgarian pop singers. The song is about the power of childhood dreams that can make the world a better and brighter place to live.

Lidia is a fan of both Junior Eurovision and the Eurovision Song Contest. Her favourite artists include Adele, Ariana Grande, Beyoncé and Christina Aguilera. She lists Bulgarian artists Lili Ivanova, Pasha Hristova and Margarita Hranova as having the greatest artistic influence on her. Lidia has a pet rabbit called, Zai Zai, who is also her mascot. Her favourite subjects at school are literature, English and music. Since 2018 she lives in Espoo, Finland

=== Valsheben den ===
"Valsheben den" (Bulgarian Cyrillic: Вълшебен ден; English translation: "Magical Day") is a song by Bulgarian child singer Lidia Ganeva. It represented Bulgaria during the Junior Eurovision Song Contest 2016. It is composed and written by Vladimir Ampov (Grafa) and Iliya Grigorov. It ended in 9th place with 161 points.

== At Junior Eurovision ==
During the opening ceremony and the running order draw which took place on 14 November 2016, Bulgaria was drawn to perform sixth on 20 November 2016, following Malta and preceding Macedonia.

The final will be broadcast in Bulgaria on BNT 1, BNT HD and BNT World.

=== Final ===
For the live performance, Lidia had chosen a white dress with colorful doves on it to wear on stage. A similar design was also shown in the stage design.

=== Voting ===
During the press conference for the Junior Eurovision Song Contest 2016, held in Stockholm, the Reference Group announced several changes to the voting format for the 2016 contest. Previously, points had been awarded based on a combination of 50% National juries and 50% televoting, with one more set of points also given out by a 'Kids' Jury'. However, this year, points will be awarded based on a 50/50 combination of each country's Adult and Kids' Jury, to be announced by a spokesperson. For the first time since the inauguration of the contest the voting procedure will not include a public televote. Following these results, three expert jurors will also announce their points from 1–8, 10, and 12. These professional jurors are: Christer Björkman, Mads Grimstad, and Jedward.

Points awarded to Bulgaria
Score	Adult and expert juries	Kids juries
12 points	Poland	
10 points		
8 points	Armenia; Mads Grimstad	Belarus; Israel
7 points	Australia; Italy; Macedonia	Netherlands
6 points	Albania; Christer Björkman; Georgia; Malta; Netherlands	Ireland; Macedonia
5 points	Belarus	Armenia; Albania; Malta
4 points		
3 points	Ireland; Ukraine	Australia; Cyprus; Italy; Russia; Serbia
2 points		Ukraine
1 point	Cyprus; Jedward; Serbia	Poland

Points awarded by Bulgaria
Score	Adult jury	Kids jury
12 points	Georgia	Armenia
10 points	Belarus	Russia
8 points	Armenia	Belarus
7 points	Netherlands	Italy
6 points	Italy	Australia
5 points	Malta	Malta
4 points	Australia	Ukraine
3 points	Ireland	Serbia
2 points	Ukraine	Poland
1 point	Russia	Netherlands
