= Macedonia in the Junior Eurovision Song Contest 2016 =

- Junior Eurovision Song Contest 2016
- Country: Macedonia
- Selection process: Internal selection
- Announcement date: Artist: 24 July 2016; Song: 10 October 2016

Competing entry
- Song: "Love Will Lead Our Way"
- Artist: Martija Stanojković
- Songwriters: Aleksandar Masevski; Martija Stanojković

Placement
- Final result: 12th, 41 points

Participation chronology

Macedonia was represented at the Junior Eurovision Song Contest 2016 which took place on 20 November 2016, in Valletta, Malta, under the provisional reference of "Former Yugoslav Republic of Macedonia". The Macedonian public broadcaster Macedonian Radio Television (MRT) was responsible for organising their entry for the contest. Martija Stanojković was internally selected to represent Macedonia with the song "Love Will Lead Our Way".

== Background ==
Prior to the 2016 Contest, Macedonia had participated in the Junior Eurovision Song Contest eleven times, under the provisional reference of "Former Yugoslav Republic of Macedonia", since its debut at the inaugural contest in 2003. Macedonia were absent twice from the Junior Eurovision Song Contest in 2012 and 2014. They have never won the contest, with their best results being at the 2007 and 2008, represented by the duo Rosica Kulakova and Dimitar Stojmenovski, and Bobi Andonov respectively, achieving fifth place.

== Before Junior Eurovision ==
The Macedonian broadcaster announced on 19 July 2016, that they would be participating at the contest scheduled to take place on 20 November 2016, in Valletta, Malta. On 24 July 2016, MRT announced that they had internally selected Martija Stanojković to represent them in Malta. Her song for the contest, "Love Will Lead Our Way", was released on 10 October 2016.

== Artist and song information ==
Martija Stanojković
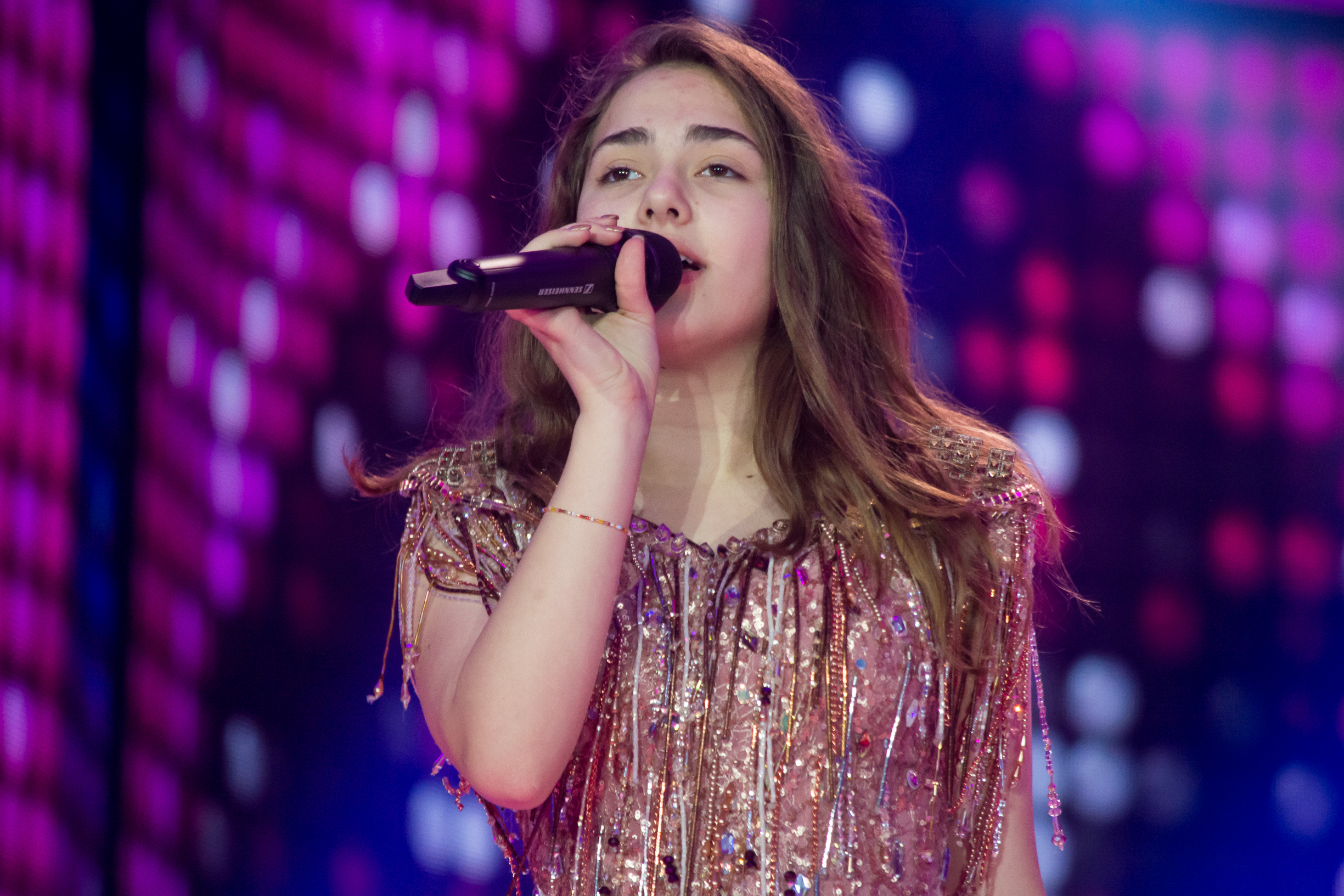

Background information
- Birth name: Martija Stanojković
- Born: 7 April 2004 (age 21); Skopje, Macedonia
- Occupation(s): Student and singer
- Instrument: Vocals

(North Macedonia) "Love Will Lead Our Way"
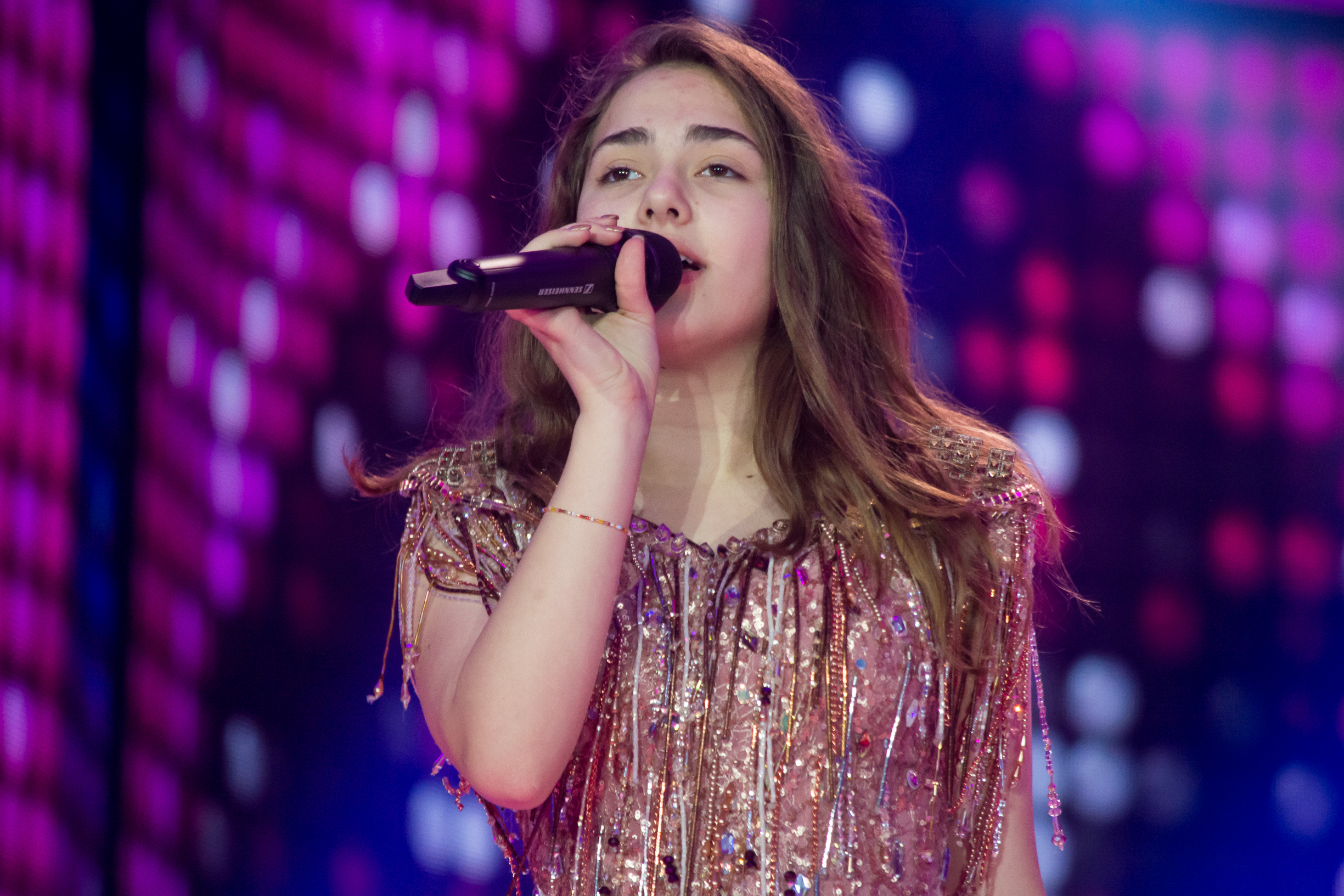

Junior Eurovision Song Contest 2016 entry
- Country: Macedonia
- Artist(s): Martija Stanojković
- Languages: Macedonian, English
- Composer(s): Aleksandar Masevski
- Lyricist(s): Aleksandar Masevski, Martija Stanojković

Finals performance
- Final result: {{{place}}}

Entry chronology
- ◄ "Pletenka – Braid of Love" (2015)

=== Martija Stanojković ===
Martija Stanojković (Macedonian: Мартија Станојковиќ) (born 7 April 2004) is a Macedonian-Serbian singer. She represented Macedonia at the Junior Eurovision Song Contest 2016 in Valletta, Malta on 20 November 2016 with the song "Love Will Lead Our Way".

Martija finished second in the Serbian singing contest Pinkove Zvezdice, which is popular in the Balkan region. When she was four years old, she joined a dance club called Ultra, and she was dancing for seven years before she entered Pinkove Zvezdice. Martija is a fan of Justin Bieber.

=== Love Will Lead Our Way ===
"Love Will Lead Our Way" is a song by Macedonian singer Martija Stanojković. It represented Macedonia during the Junior Eurovision Song Contest 2016. It is composed and written by Aleksandar Masevski and Martija Stanojković. The official music video for the song was released on 10 October 2016.

== At Junior Eurovision ==
During the opening ceremony and the running order draw which took place on 14 November 2016, Macedonia was drawn to perform seventh on 20 November 2016, following Bulgaria and preceding Poland.

The final was broadcast in Macedonia on MRT 1.

=== Final ===
At the beginning of her performance, Martija and her three dancers stood in the back of the stage in the shape of a pyramid, with Martija furthest back. When the music started, the dancers revealed Martija after about 15 seconds. The backdrop was lit up with red glitter in the beginning, which turned into different patterns that varied between the verse and the chorus. Despite being a favorite to win the contest, they only came 12th place.

=== Voting ===
During the press conference for the Junior Eurovision Song Contest 2016, held in Stockholm, the Reference Group announced several changes to the voting format for the 2016 contest. Previously, points had been awarded based on a combination of 50% National juries and 50% televoting, with one more set of points also given out by a 'Kids' Jury'. However, this year, points will be awarded based on a 50/50 combination of each country's Adult and Kids' Jury, to be announced by a spokesperson. For the first time since the inauguration of the contest the voting procedure will not include a public televote. Following these results, three expert jurors will also announce their points from 1–8, 10, and 12. These professional jurors are: Christer Björkman, Mads Grimstad, and Jedward.

Points awarded to Macedonia
Score	Adult and expert juries	Kids juries
12 points		
10 points		
8 points		Netherlands
7 points		Albania
6 points		
5 points	Australia	
4 points		
3 points	Serbia	Israel
2 points	Albania; Israel; Malta; Netherlands	Italy; Poland
1 point	Italy	Georgia; Malta

Points awarded by Macedonia
Score	Adult jury	Kids jury
12 points	Italy	Russia
10 points	Armenia	Malta
8 points	Russia	Armenia
7 points	Bulgaria	Italy
6 points	Malta	Bulgaria
5 points	Serbia	Georgia
4 points	Netherlands	Netherlands
3 points	Belarus	Serbia
2 points	Poland	Australia
1 point	Australia	Albania
