= Poland in the Junior Eurovision Song Contest 2016 =

- Junior Eurovision Song Contest 2016
- Country: Poland
- Selection process: National selection
- Selection date: 15 October 2016

Competing entry
- Song: "Nie zapomnij"
- Artist: Olivia Wieczorek
- Songwriters: Piotr Rubik; Dominik Grabowski

Placement
- Final result: 11th, 60 points

Participation chronology

Poland was represented at the Junior Eurovision Song Contest 2016 which took place on 20 November 2016, in Valletta, Malta. The Polish broadcaster Telewizja Polska (TVP) was responsible for organising their entry for the contest. A national final of nine competing acts participated in a televised production where the winner was determined by a 50/50 combination of votes from jury members made up of music professionals and a public telephone vote. On 15 October 2016, Olivia Wieczorek was selected to represent Poland with the song "Nie zapomnij".

Poland returned to the contest after being absent from the contest since their last appearance in 2004.

== Background ==
Prior to the 2016 contest, Poland had participated in the Junior Eurovision Song Contest twice in 2003 and 2004, and withdrew from participation between 2005 and 2015. They have never won the contest, only finishing in last place in 2003.

== Before Junior Eurovision ==
The Polish broadcaster announced on 13 July 2016, that they would be making their return to the contest after a twelve-year absence. TVP was responsible for organising the national selection show in order to select their entrant and song. The show was scheduled to take place on 8 October 2016, but was later changed to 15 October. On 14 October 2016, Jagoda Krystek withdrew from the Junior Eurovision selection.

=== Final ===
The national final took place on 15 October 2016, which saw ten competing acts participating in a televised production where the winner was determined by a 50/50 combination of both telephone vote and the votes of jury members made up of music professionals. Olivia Wieczorek was selected to represent Poland with the song "Nie zapomnij", which was composed and written by Piotr Rubik and Dominik Grabowski.

Key: Winner

Draw	Artist	Song	Songwriter(s)
1	WAMWAY	"Zróbmy hałas"	Marta Florczak, Jacek Winkiel
2	Ania Dąbrowska	"Fryzurka"	Maciej Sieklucki, Jarosław Babula, Jarek Babula
3	Dominika Ptak	"Jak kropla"	Estera Naczk, Grzegorz Ryba
4	Julia Chmielarska	"Na skrzydłach dni"	Rafał Podraza, Jerzy Petersburski Jr.
5	ASMki	"Do końca świata"	Amelia Zduńczyk, Anna Kugel, Natalia Pawlikowska, Malwina Skorek
6	Urszula Dorosz	"Życie to nie gra"	Anna Kuk, Marek Balaszczuk
7	Amelia Andryszczyk	"Marzenia"	Amelia Andryszczyk
8	ARFIK	"Kocie tango"	Barbara Stenka, Ryszard Leoszewski
9	Olivia Wieczorek	"Nie zapomnij"	Piotr Rubik, Dominik Grabowski

== At Junior Eurovision ==
During the opening ceremony and the running order draw which took place on 14 November 2016, Poland was drawn to perform eighth on 20 November 2016, following Macedonia and preceding Belarus.

=== Final ===
The final was broadcast in Poland on TVP1 and TVP Polonia with commentary by Artur Orzech.

=== Voting ===
During the press conference for the Junior Eurovision Song Contest 2016, held in Stockholm, the Reference Group announced several changes to the voting format for the 2016 contest. Previously, points had been awarded based on a combination of 50% National juries and 50% televoting, with one more set of points also given out by a 'Kids' Jury'. However, this year, points will be awarded based on a 50/50 combination of each country’s Adult and Kids' Jury, to be announced by a spokesperson. For the first time since the inauguration of the contest the voting procedure will not include a public televote. Following these results, three expert jurors will also announce their points from 1-8, 10, and 12. These professional jurors are: Christer Björkman, Mads Grimstad, and Jedward.

Points awarded to Poland
Score	Adult and expert juries	Kids juries
12 points		Armenia
10 points		Israel
8 points		
7 points		Belarus
6 points	Italy	
5 points		
4 points	Israel; Russia	Malta
3 points	Jedward	
2 points	Armenia; Macedonia	Bulgaria
1 point	Belarus; Georgia; Malta	Albania

Points awarded by Poland
Score	Adult jury	Kids jury
12 points	Bulgaria	Italy
10 points	Australia	Malta
8 points	Georgia	Australia
7 points	Russia	Ireland
6 points	Italy	Russia
5 points	Belarus	Israel
4 points	Ukraine	Albania
3 points	Netherlands	Georgia
2 points	Israel	Macedonia
1 point	Malta	Bulgaria
