= Armenia in the Junior Eurovision Song Contest 2016 =

- Junior Eurovision Song Contest 2016
- Country: Armenia
- Selection process: Internal Selection
- Selection date: Artist: 10 August 2016; Song: 28 October 2016

Competing entry
- Song: "Tarber"
- Artist: Anahit Adamyan and Mary Vardanyan
- Songwriters: Nick Egibyan; Avet Barseghyan

Placement
- Final result: 2nd, 232 points

Participation chronology

Armenia was represented at the Junior Eurovision Song Contest 2016 which took place on 20 November 2016, in Valletta, Malta. The Armenian broadcaster Armenian Public Television (ARMTV) was responsible for organising their entry for the contest. Anahit Adamyan and Mary Vardanyan were internally selected to represent Armenia with the song "Tarber".

== Background ==
Prior to the 2016 Contest, Armenia had participated in the Junior Eurovision Song Contest nine times since its first entry in 2007, with their best result being in 2010 when they won with the song "Mama", performed by Vladimir Arzumanyan. Armenia went on to host the Junior Eurovision Song Contest 2011, in the Armenian capital, Yerevan.

== Before Junior Eurovision ==
"I was very inspired by Mary and Anahit. The song was already creating itself in my mind, when I met them for the first time. As soon as we started rehearsing, I realised that the song fits them perfectly. It's very interesting, how music can unite two completely different artists, with different vocals and styles. I think we have created something very special!"

—Nick Egibyan
(the composer of the song)

The Armenian broadcaster announced on 21 July 2016, that they would be participating at the contest being held in Valletta, Malta on 20 November 2016. ARMTV announced on 10 August 2016 that they had internally selected Anahit Adamyan and Mary Vardanyan to represent them at the contest. Their song for the contest, "Tarber", was released on 28 October 2016.

== Artist and song information ==
=== Anahit Adamyan and Mary Vardanyan ===
Anahit Adamyan
- Born: 28 July 2003 (age 23); Sochi, Russia
- Genres: Pop; R&B
- Occupation: Singer
- Instrument: Vocals
- Years active: 2013–present

Anahit was born in Sochi, Russia in summer 2003. Anahit started singing when she was four years old. Her professional career started in 2013, when she participated in the auditions of Russia's The Voice Kids competition. Later Anahit took part in Igor Krutoy's "The battle of talents" show where she was one of the three finalists.

Mary Vardanyan
- Born: 7 April 2003 (age 23); Vardenis, Armenia
- Genres: Pop; R&B
- Occupation: Singer
- Instrument: Vocals
- Years active: 2011–present

Mary was born in April 2003 in Vardenis. She took her first steps into music back in 2011, when she started studying music at the Do-Re-Mi vocal school. She has participated in numerous music competitions, including the Renaissance International Music Festival, where she took the grand prix and the Friendship of Nations music competition, where she took first place. She had also previously participated in Armenia's national selection for Junior Eurovision in 2013.

=== Tarber ===
"Tarber"

Junior Eurovision Song Contest 2016 entry
- Country: Armenia
- Artists: Anahit Adamyan and Mary Vardanyan
- As: Anahit & Mary
- Languages: Armenian, English
- Composer: Nick Egibyan
- Lyricist: Avet Barseghyan

Finals performance
- Final result: 2nd
- Final points: 232

Entry chronology
- ◄ "Love" (2015)
- "Boomerang" (2017) ►

"Tarber" (Armenian: Տարբեր; English translation: "Different") is a song by Armenian teen singers Anahit Adamyan and Mary Vardanyan. It will represent Armenia during the Junior Eurovision Song Contest 2016. It is composed and written by Nick Egibyan and Avet Barseghyan, and produced by Anush Hovnanyan.

== At Junior Eurovision ==
During the opening ceremony and the running order draw which took place on 14 November 2016, Armenia was drawn to perform second on 20 November 2015, following Ireland and preceding Albania.

The final was broadcast in Armenia on Armenia 1.

=== Final ===
Anahit and Mary were joined by a backstage group of four girls who were dancing around the duo throughout the whole performance of "Tarber".

=== Voting ===
During the press conference for the Junior Eurovision Song Contest 2016, held in Stockholm, the Reference Group announced several changes to the voting format for the 2016 contest. Previously, points had been awarded based on a combination of 50% National juries and 50% televoting, with one more set of points also given out by a 'Kids' Jury'. However, this year, points will be awarded based on a 50/50 combination of each country's Adult and Kids' Jury, to be announced by a spokesperson. For the first time since the inauguration of the contest the voting procedure will not include a public televote. Following these results, three expert jurors will also announce their points from 1–8, 10, and 12. These professional jurors are: Christer Björkman, Mads Grimstad, and Jedward.

Points awarded to Armenia
Score	Adult and expert juries	Kids juries
12 points	Serbia	Belarus; Bulgaria
10 points	Belarus; Israel; Jedward; Macedonia; Malta	Italy; Russia; Serbia
8 points	Christer Björkman; Bulgaria; Georgia	Georgia; Macedonia
7 points	Cyprus; Netherlands; Russia	Ireland; Malta
6 points		Albania; Netherlands
5 points	Mads Grimstad	Australia; Ukraine
4 points	Australia; Ireland	Cyprus
3 points		
2 points	Ukraine	
1 point		

Points awarded by Armenia
Score	Adult jury	Kids jury
12 points	Georgia	Poland
10 points	Netherlands	Georgia
8 points	Bulgaria	Belarus
7 points	Belarus	Netherlands
6 points	Russia	Malta
5 points	Australia	Bulgaria
4 points	Malta	Albania
3 points	Ukraine	Russia
2 points	Poland	Cyprus
1 point	Italy	Italy
