= Australia in the Junior Eurovision Song Contest 2016 =

- Junior Eurovision Song Contest 2016
- Participating broadcaster: Special Broadcasting Service (SBS)
- Country: Australia
- Selection process: Internal selection
- Announcement date: Artist: 29 September 2016; Song: 7 October 2016

Competing entry
- Song: "We Are"
- Artist: Alexa Curtis
- Songwriters: Ali Tamposi; Tania Doko; Boi-1da

Placement
- Final result: 5th, 202 points

Participation chronology

Australia was represented at the Junior Eurovision Song Contest 2016 which took place on 20 November 2016, in Valletta, Malta. Special Broadcasting Service (SBS) was responsible for organising their entry for the contest. Alexa Curtis was internally selected to represent Australia with the song "We Are".

== Background ==
Prior to the 2016 Contest, Australia had participated in the Junior Eurovision Song Contest once since its debut in 2015, with the song "My Girls" performed by Bella Paige.

== Before Junior Eurovision ==
The Australian broadcaster announced on 12 September 2016, that they would be participating at the contest to be held in Valletta, Malta. On 29 September 2016, it was announced that Alexa Curtis had been internally chosen by the broadcaster to represent Australia. Curtis performed the song "We Are", which was premiered on 7 October 2016.

== Artist and song information ==
Alexa Curtis
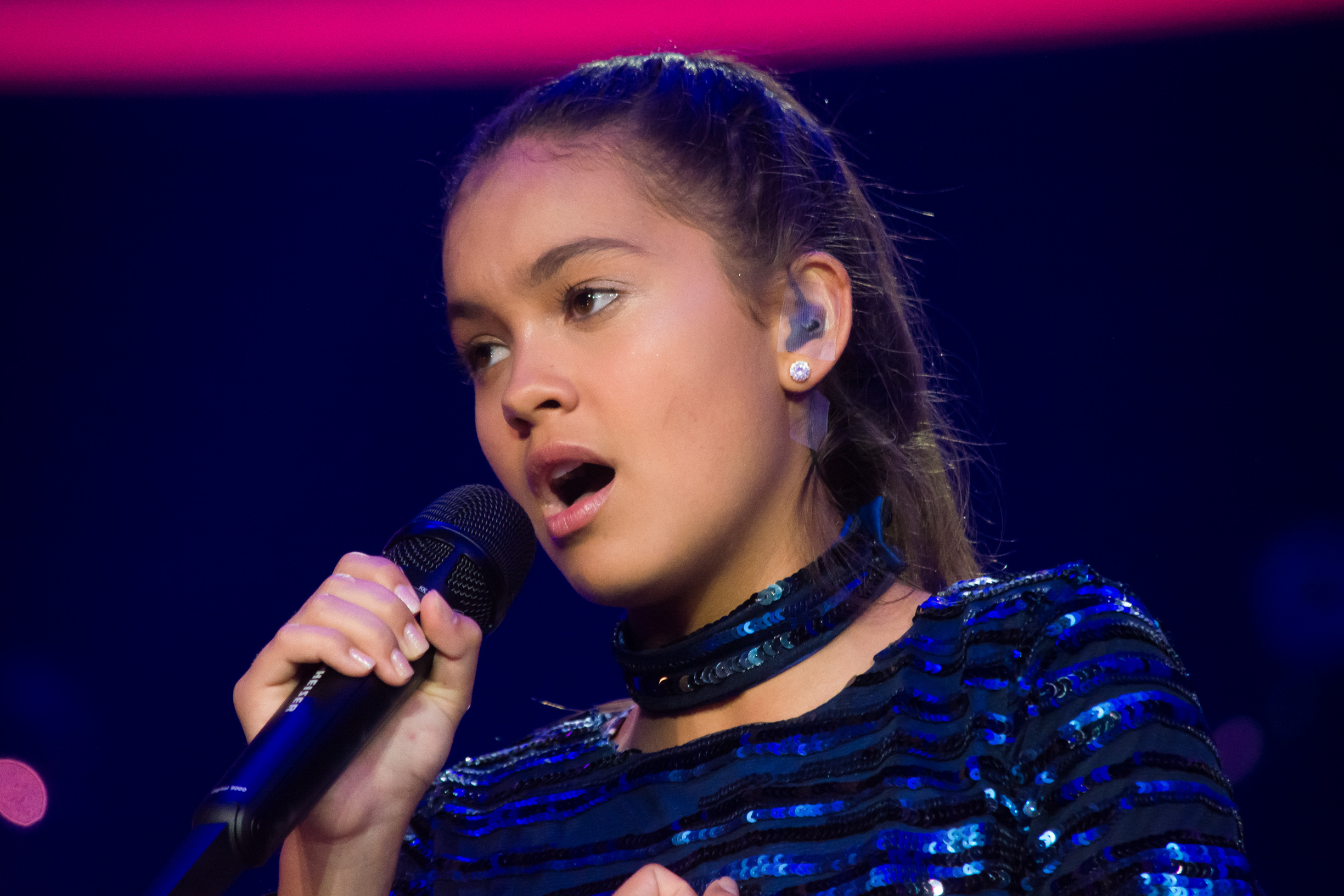

Background information
- Born: 4 January 2004 (age 22); Gold Coast, Australia
- Origin: Brisbane, Australia
- Genres: Pop
- Occupation: Singer
- Years active: 2014–present
- Label: Universal Music
- Website: alexacurtis.com

(Australia) "We Are"
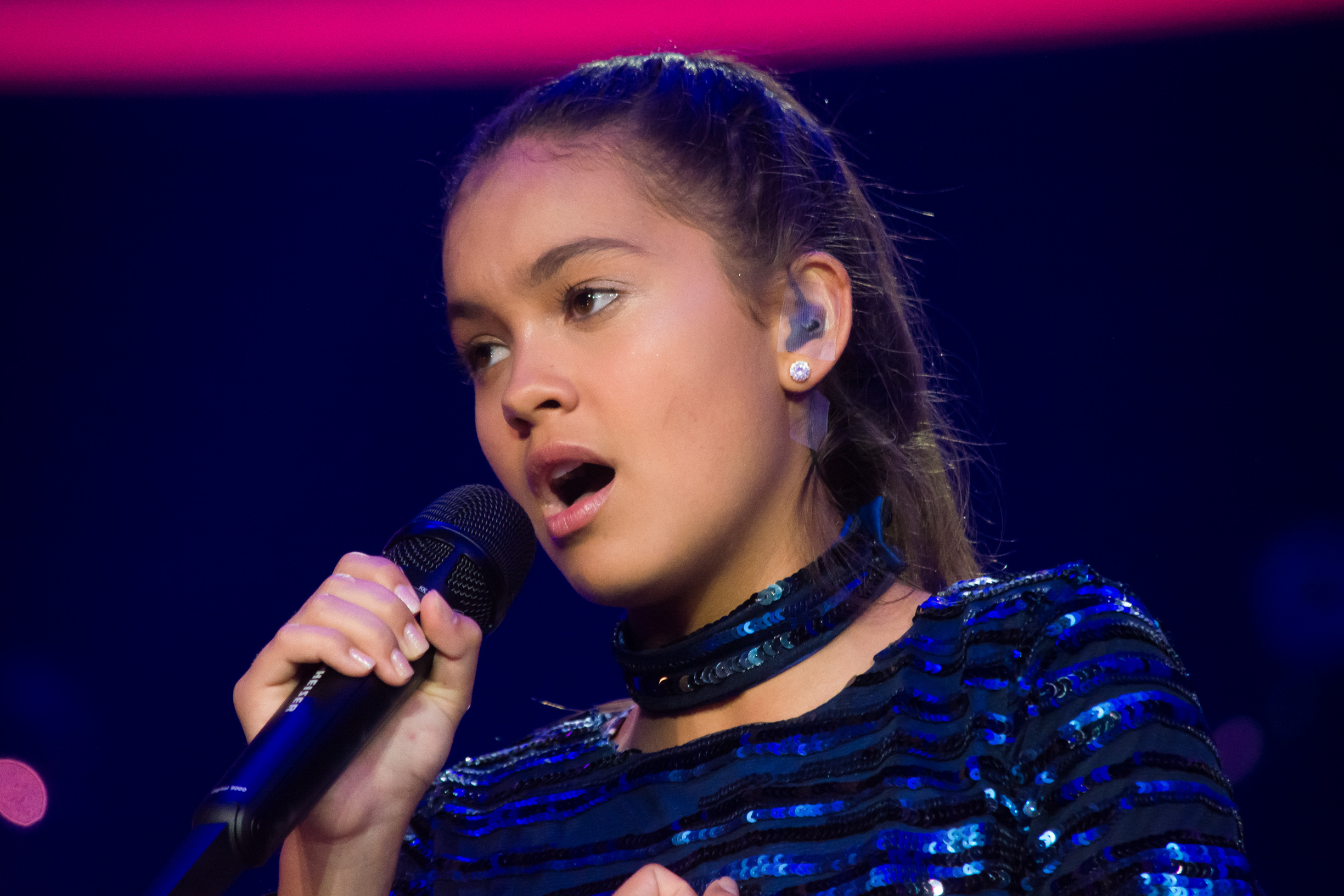

Junior Eurovision Song Contest 2016 entry
- Country: Australia
- Artist: Alexa Curtis
- Languages: English
- Composers: Ali Tamposi, Tania Doko, Boi-1da
- Lyricists: Ali Tamposi, Tania Doko, Boi-1da

Finals performance
- Final result: 5th
- Final points: 202

Entry chronology
- ◄ "My Girls" (2015)

=== Alexa Curtis ===
Alexa Curtis (born 4 January 2004) is an Australian singer who won The Voice Kids Australia in 2014. She won through Team Delta and is now signed to Universal Music Australia. She represented Australia in the Junior Eurovision Song Contest 2016 with the song "We Are".

In 2012, Alexa appeared in a production of Oliver! alongside her brother, Aidan. She appeared twice in the 2014 Schools Spectacular, first performing with her Voice Kids co-stars, then duetting with The Voice winner Anja Nissen. In 2014, she performed with a small group of The Voice Kids at Vision Australia's Carols by Candlelight. In 2015, she performed at the IGA Lord Mayor's Christmas Carols appearing twice, once as a solo performer, then duetting with Napoleon 'Polo' Cummings. In March 2016, she sang the opening theme song for six episodes of The Powerpuff Girls on Cartoon Network Australia.

=== We Are ===
"We Are" represented Australia during the Junior Eurovision Song Contest 2016. It was composed and written by Ali Tamposi, Tania Doko and Boi-1da.

== At Junior Eurovision ==
During the opening ceremony and the running order draw which took place on 14 November 2016, Australia was drawn to perform fourteenth on 20 November 2016, following Israel and preceding the Netherlands.

The final was broadcast in Australia on SBS One.

=== Voting ===
During the press conference for the Junior Eurovision Song Contest 2016, held in Stockholm, the Reference Group announced several changes to the voting format for the 2016 contest. Previously, points had been awarded based on a combination of 50% National juries and 50% televoting, with one more set of points also given out by a 'Kids' Jury'. However, this year, points were awarded based on a 50/50 combination of each country's Adult and Kids' Jury, to be announced by a spokesperson. For the first time since the inauguration of the contest the voting procedure did not include a public televote. Following these results, three expert jurors also announced their points from 1–8, 10, and 12. These professional jurors are: Christer Björkman, Mads Grimstad, and Jedward.

Points awarded to Australia
| Score | Adult and expert juries | Kids juries |
|---|---|---|
| 12 points | Georgia | Ireland; Netherlands |
| 10 points | Albania; Poland | Cyprus; Georgia |
| 8 points | Italy; Malta | Malta; Poland |
| 7 points | Mads Grimstad; Jedward; Ukraine | Italy; Russia |
| 6 points | Belarus; Russia | Bulgaria; Serbia |
| 5 points | Armenia; Ireland | |
| 4 points | Bulgaria; Netherlands | Ukraine; Israel |
| 3 points | Christer Björkman | |
| 2 points | | Albania; Macedonia |
| 1 point | Macedonia | Belarus |

Points awarded by Australia
| Score | Adult jury | Kids jury |
|---|---|---|
| 12 points | Malta | Georgia |
| 10 points | Belarus | Malta |
| 8 points | Ireland | Italy |
| 7 points | Bulgaria | Belarus |
| 6 points | Georgia | Ireland |
| 5 points | Macedonia | Armenia |
| 4 points | Armenia | Israel |
| 3 points | Netherlands | Bulgaria |
| 2 points | Russia | Albania |
| 1 point | Albania | Ukraine |
