= Israel in the Junior Eurovision Song Contest 2016 =

- Junior Eurovision Song Contest 2016
- Country: Israel
- Selection process: Internal Selection
- Selection date: Artist: 26 October 2016; Song: 8 November 2016

Competing entry
- Song: "Follow My Heart"
- Artist: Shir & Tim
- Songwriters: Dor Daniel; Noam Horev

Placement
- Final result: 15th, 27 points

Participation chronology

Israel was represented at the Junior Eurovision Song Contest 2016 which took place on 20 November 2016, in Valletta, Malta. The Israeli broadcaster Israel Broadcasting Authority (IBA) was responsible for organising their entry for the contest. This was Israel's second appearance at the Junior Eurovision Song Contest.

== Background ==
Prior to the 2016 contest, Israel had participated in the Junior Eurovision Song Contest once since its debut in 2012, represented by the group Kids.il, who performed the song "Let the Music Win", which finished in eighth place achieving a score of sixty-eight points. Israel has previously shown interest to take part in the 2004 and 2008 contests, although no reasons were ever published to detail the change of interest.

== Before Junior Eurovision ==
The EBU published the final list of participating countries on 28 September 2016, in which Israel appeared within the participating list for the contest which takes place on 20 November 2016, in Valletta, Malta. On 26 October 2016, Shir & Tim were selected to represent Israel. On 8 November 2016, it was revealed that they were to perform the song "Follow My Heart", written by Noam Horev, who is also credited with having written the lyrics for "Milim", Israel's entry in the Eurovision Song Contest 2010.

== Artist and song information ==
=== Shira Frieman and TimoTi Sannikov (Shir & Tim) ===
Shir & Tim
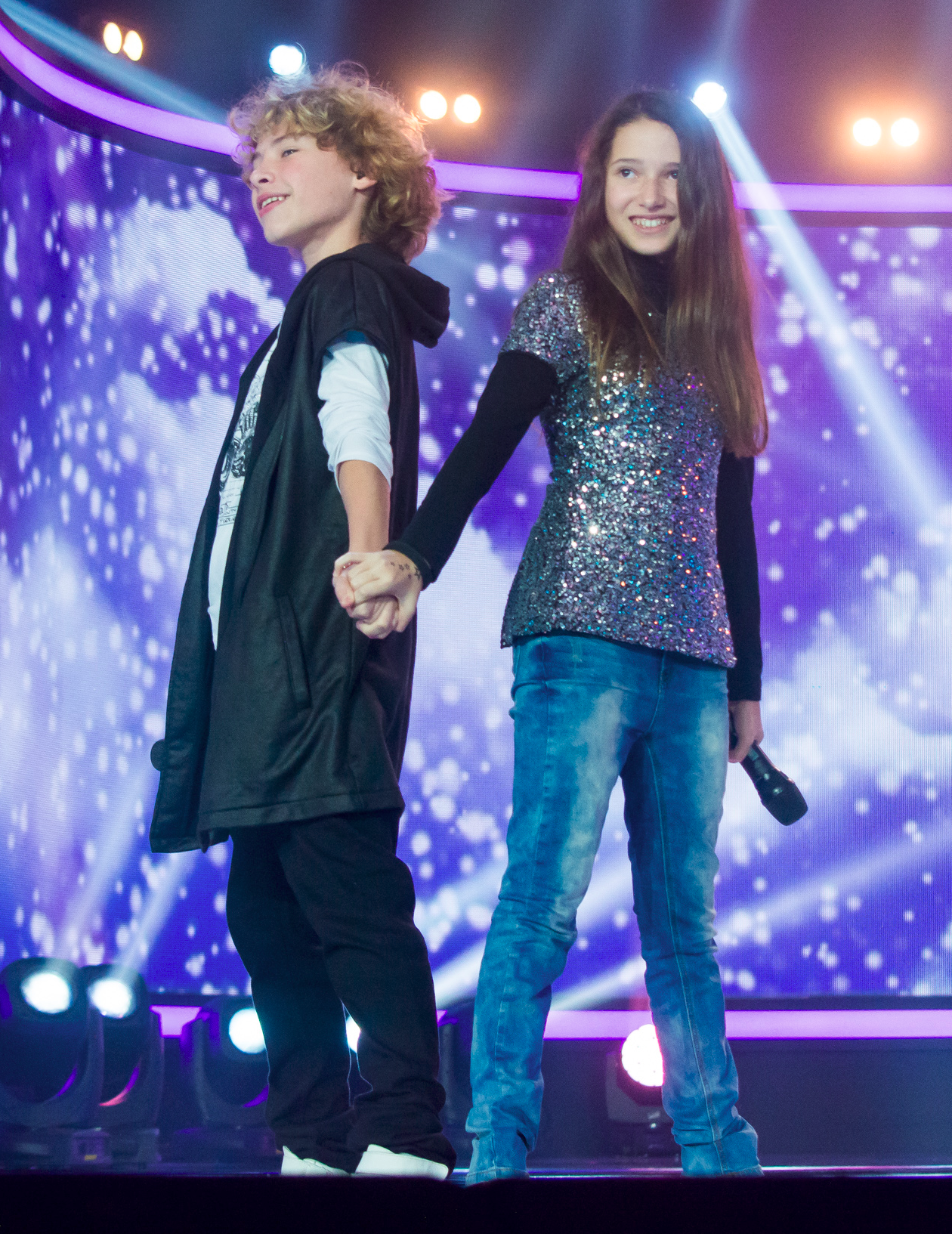

Background information
- Origin: Israel
- Genres: Pop
- Years active: 2016
- Members: Shira Frieman; TimoTi Sannikov

Shira Frieman
- Born: 4 April 2003 (age 22)
- Genres: Pop *Jazz
- Occupation: Singer
- Instruments: Vocals, saxophone

Shira Frieman (Hebrew: שירה פרימן; born 4 April 2003) is an Israeli child singer who, prior to representing Israel in the Junior Eurovision Song Contest 2016, has participated in "The Music School", a music competition for children. Besides singing, Frieman plays the saxophone and dances to jazz music.

TimoTi Sannikov
- Born: 20 August 2003 (age 22)
- Genres: Pop
- Occupation: Singer
- Instruments: Vocals, piano, organ
- Website: sannikovsland.com

TimoTi Sannikov (Hebrew: טימוטי סניקוב; born 20 August 2003) is an Israeli child singer who has participated in several music festivals, including Being a Star and Slavic Bazaar. He also plays the role of Michael in the Israeli production of Billy Elliot the Musical. In 2016, he participated in The Voice Kids Ukraine and represented Israel in the Junior Eurovision Song Contest.

=== Follow My Heart ===
(Israel) "Follow My Heart"

Junior Eurovision Song Contest 2016 entry
- Country: Israel
- Artists: Shira Frieman and TimoTi Sannikov
- As: Shir & Tim
- Languages: Hebrew, English
- Composer: Dor Daniel
- Lyricist: Noam Horev

Finals performance
- Final result: 15th
- Final points: 27

Entry chronology
- ◄ "Let the Music Win" (2012)
- "Children Like These" (2018) ►

"Follow My Heart" is a song by Israeli singers Shira Frieman and TimoTi Sannikov. It represented Israel during the Junior Eurovision Song Contest 2016. It is composed and written by Dor Daniel and Noam Horev. It ended in 15th place with 27 points.

== At Junior Eurovision ==
During the opening ceremony and the running order draw which took place on 14 November 2016, Israel was drawn to perform thirteenth on 20 November 2015, following Serbia and preceding Australia.

=== Final ===
Tim sung the first verse and chorus from stage-left. The beginning of the second verse was sung by Shir from centre-stage. Tim joined Shir at centre-stage and the duo completed the song in unison against a backdrop of a moving cluster of stars.

=== Voting ===
During the press conference for the Junior Eurovision Song Contest 2016, held in Stockholm, the Reference Group announced several changes to the voting format for the 2016 contest. Previously, points had been awarded based on a combination of 50% National juries and 50% televoting, with one more set of points also given out by a 'Kids' Jury'. However, this year, points will be awarded based on a 50/50 combination of each country's Adult and Kids' Jury, to be announced by a spokesperson. For the first time since the inauguration of the contest the voting procedure will not include a public televote. Following these results, three expert jurors will also announce their points from 1–8, 10, and 12. These professional jurors are: Christer Björkman, Mads Grimstad, and Jedward.

Points awarded to Israel
Score	Adult and expert juries	Kids juries
12 points		
10 points		
8 points		
7 points		
6 points		
5 points		Poland
4 points		Australia; Italy
3 points	Albania	Albania
2 points	Poland	Cyprus
1 point	Christer Björkman; Ukraine	Ireland; Serbia

Points awarded by Israel
Score	Adult jury	Kids jury
12 points	Belarus	Netherlands
10 points	Armenia	Poland
8 points	Georgia	Bulgaria
7 points	Italy	Italy
6 points	Netherlands	Russia
5 points	Russia	Belarus
4 points	Poland	Australia
3 points	Ukraine	Macedonia
2 points	Macedonia	Georgia
1 point	Malta	Ireland
