= Georgia in the Junior Eurovision Song Contest 2016 =

- Junior Eurovision Song Contest 2016
- Participating broadcaster: Georgian Public Broadcaster (GPB)
- Country: Georgia
- Selection process: Internal selection
- Announcement date: Artist: 30 September 2016; Song: 24 October 2016

Competing entry
- Song: "Mzeo"
- Artist: Mariam Mamadashvili
- Songwriters: Maka Davitaia; Giorgi Kukhianidze

Placement
- Final result: 1st, 239 points

Participation chronology

Georgia was represented at the Junior Eurovision Song Contest 2016 with the song "Mzeo", written by Maka Davitaia and Giorgi Kukhianidze, and performed by Mariam Mamadashvili. The Georgian participating broadcaster, Georgian Public Broadcaster (GPB), internally selected its entry for the contest. The song won the contest with 239 points.

== Background ==
Prior to the 2016 contest, Georgian Public Broadcaster (GPB) had participated in the Junior Eurovision Song Contest representing Georgia nine times since its debut in 2007. They had never missed any edition of the contest since debut, and won twice in 2008 and 2011.

== Before Junior Eurovision ==
GPB announced on 17 August 2016 that it would be participating at the Junior Eurovision Song Contest 2016. An open selection process was held, with the submission window open between 17 August and 25 September, after which a committee consisting of Rusudan Bakhtadze (vocal coach), Nato Dumbadze (producer), Zaza Orashvili (director), Nika Kocharov (singer, represented Georgia in the Eurovision Song Contest 2016) and Lizi Pop (singer, represented Georgia in the Junior Eurovision Song Contest 2014) chose the artist internally. On 30 September 2016, Mariam Mamadashvili was selected to represent Georgia. Her song for the contest, "Mzeo", was presented on 24 October 2016.

== At Junior Eurovision ==
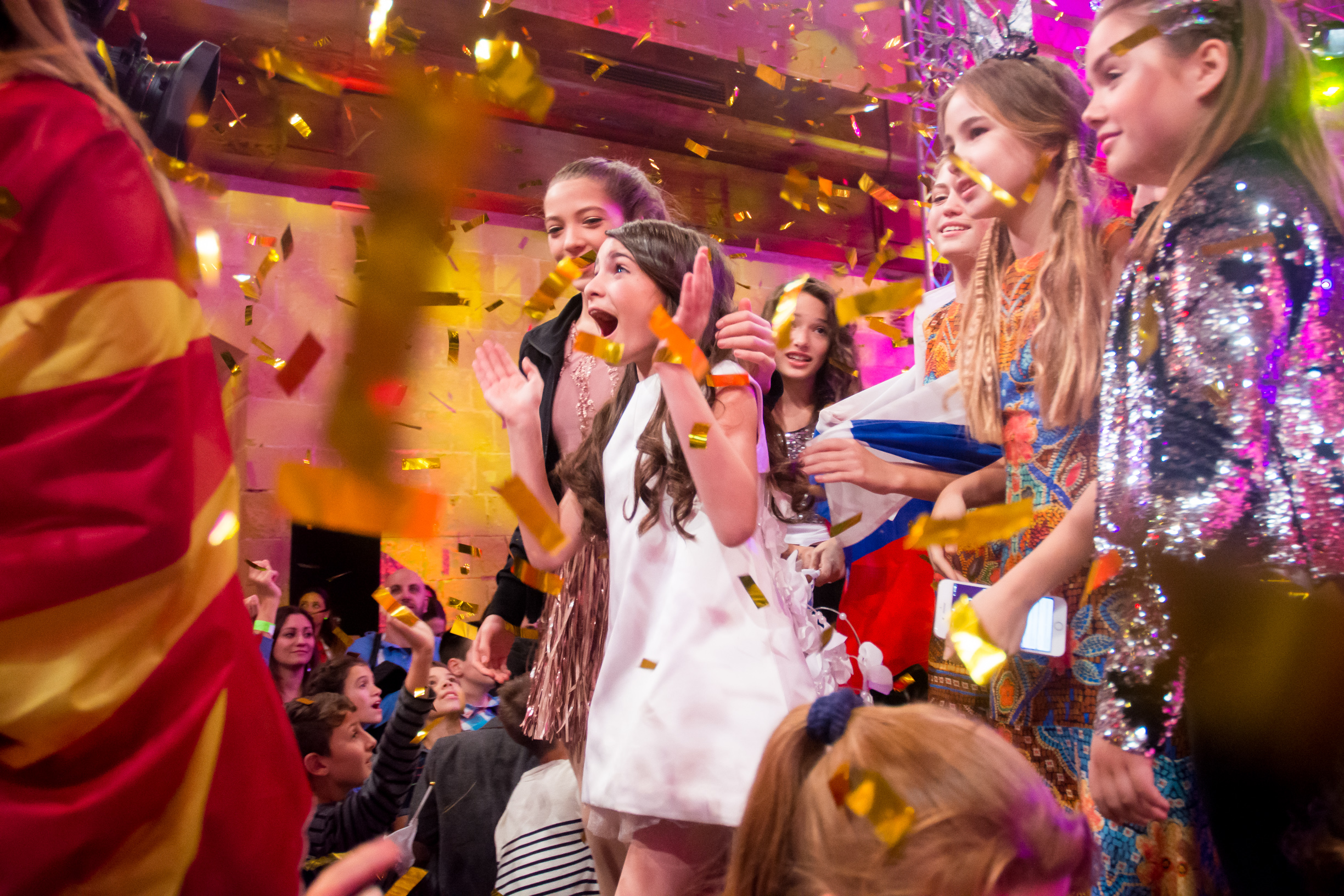
Mariam Mamadashvili after being announced as the winner of the contest.

During the opening ceremony and the running order draw which took place on 14 November 2016, Georgia was drawn to perform last on 20 November 2016, following Cyprus.

=== Final ===
Mariam Mamadashvili performed in a white dress with the microphone in her right hand against a backdrop of a yellow flower which morphs into the sun.

=== Voting ===
During the press conference for the Junior Eurovision Song Contest 2016, held in Stockholm, the Reference Group announced several changes to the voting format for the 2016 contest. Previously, points had been awarded based on a combination of 50% National juries and 50% televoting, with one more set of points also given out by a 'Kids' Jury'. However, this year, points will be awarded based on a 50/50 combination of each country's Adult and Kids' Jury, to be announced by a spokesperson. For the first time since the inauguration of the contest the voting procedure will not include a public televote. Following these results, three expert jurors will also announce their points from 1–8, 10, and 12. These professional jurors are: Christer Björkman, Mads Grimstad, and Jedward.

Points awarded to Georgia
Score	Adult and expert juries	Kids juries
12 points	Albania; Armenia; Belarus; Bulgaria; Cyprus; Ireland; Netherlands; Ukraine	Australia; Cyprus; Ukraine
10 points	Russia; Serbia	Armenia
8 points	Israel; Poland	Serbia
7 points		
6 points	Australia; Jedward	
5 points	Christer Björkman	Macedonia; Netherlands
4 points		Albania; Russia
3 points	Italy; Malta	Belarus; Ireland; Poland
2 points		Israel
1 point	Mads Grimstad	

Points awarded by Georgia
Score	Adult jury	Kids jury
12 points	Australia	Netherlands
10 points	Netherlands	Australia
8 points	Armenia	Armenia
7 points	Malta	Belarus
6 points	Bulgaria	Russia
5 points	Ukraine	Malta
4 points	Italy	Italy
3 points	Russia	Cyprus
2 points	Belarus	Serbia
1 point	Poland	Macedonia
