= Serbia in the Junior Eurovision Song Contest 2016 =

- Junior Eurovision Song Contest 2016
- Country: Serbia
- Selection process: Internal Selection
- Selection date: 6 October 2016

Competing entry
- Song: "U la la la"
- Artist: Dunja Jeličić
- Songwriters: Vladimir Graić; Leontina Vukomanović; Dunja Jeličić

Placement
- Final result: 17th (Last), 14 points

Participation chronology

Serbia was represented at the Junior Eurovision Song Contest 2016 which took place on 20 November 2016, in Valletta, Malta. Radio Television of Serbia (RTS) was responsible for organising their entry for the contest. Dunja Jeličić was internally selected to represent Serbia with the song "U la la la".

== Background ==
Prior to the 2016 Contest, Serbia had participated in the Junior Eurovision Song Contest seven times since its debut in 2006, and once as Serbia and Montenegro in 2005, prior to the Montenegrin independence referendum in 2006 which culminated into the dissolution of Serbia and Montenegro,

== Before Junior Eurovision ==
The Serbian broadcaster announced on 14 September 2016, that they would be participating at the contest to be held in Valletta, Malta. Ot 6 October 2016, it was announced that Dunja Jeličić would be representing the country in Valletta with the song "U la la la". Jeličić had previously appeared in the 2015 contest as the Serbian spokesperson.

== Artist and song information ==
=== Dunja Jeličić ===
Dunja Jeličić was born in Belgrade on 11 November 2003.

Dunja showed interest in music as a child, singing and dancing to every tone and rhythm of music that she heard. At the age of six she became a member of the children’s choir, Čarolija, and performed many concerts as a soloist. She was also a contestant in the competition Prvi srpski talenat (First Talents of Serbia).

In 2014, Dunja made it to the semi-finals of the big talent show for children, Pinkove zvezdice. She won the love of the audience with her flourishing vocals and sincerity. She is now in seventh grade of elementary school and also goes to music school where she is learning to play the piano.

More recently Dunja has taken part in the Čarolija music festival and at the annual Zlatna Sirena competition she won several first places in different categories and genres. Dunja enjoys different styles of music including pop, rock, and r’n’b. Her favourite performers include Beyoncé and Ariana Grande.

Dunja is very creative and outside of music Dunja she likes art and swimming. Music and acting are talents that she possesses and which she aspires to continue developing in the future. She is currently engaged in preparing the musical based on the life of Nikola Tesla; Tesla: The Secret of Electropy (Tesla: Tajna Elektropije) where she will be playing one of the leading roles.

== At Junior Eurovision ==
During the opening ceremony and the running order draw which took place on 14 November 2016, Serbia was drawn to perform twelfth on 20 November 2016, following Italy and preceding Israel.

=== Voting ===
During the press conference for the Junior Eurovision Song Contest 2016, held in Stockholm, the Reference Group announced several changes to the voting format for the 2016 contest. Previously, points had been awarded based on a combination of 50% National juries and 50% televoting, with one more set of points also given out by a 'Kids' Jury'. However, this year, points will be awarded based on a 50/50 combination of each country’s Adult and Kids' Jury, to be announced by a spokesperson. For the first time since the inauguration of the contest the voting procedure will not include a public televote. Following these results, three expert jurors will also announce their points from 1-8, 10, and 12. These professional jurors are: Christer Björkman, Mads Grimstad, and Jedward.

Points awarded to Serbia
Score	Adult and expert juries	Kids juries
12 points		
10 points		
8 points		
7 points		
6 points		
5 points	Macedonia	
4 points		
3 points		Bulgaria; Macedonia
2 points		Georgia
1 point		Italy

Points awarded by Serbia
Score	Adult jury	Kids jury
12 points	Armenia	Russia
10 points	Georgia	Armenia
8 points	Cyprus	Georgia
7 points	Albania	Belarus
6 points	Ireland	Australia
5 points	Russia	Italy
4 points	Netherlands	Malta
3 points	Macedonia	Bulgaria
2 points	Italy	Netherlands
1 point	Bulgaria	Israel
