= Italy in the Junior Eurovision Song Contest 2016 =

- Junior Eurovision Song Contest 2016
- Country: Italy
- Selection process: Internal Selection
- Selection date: 11 October 2016

Competing entry
- Song: "Cara Mamma (Dear Mom)"
- Artist: Fiamma Boccia
- Songwriters: Fiamma Boccia; Marco Iardella; Francesco Spadoni; Alessandro Ghironi

Placement
- Final result: 3rd, 209 points

Participation chronology

Italy was represented at the Junior Eurovision Song Contest 2016 which took place on 20 November 2016, in Valletta, Malta. The Italian broadcaster Rai Gulp, which is a channel owned by Radiotelevisione Italiana (RAI) was responsible for organising their entry for the contest. Fiamma Boccia was internally selected to represent Italy with the song "Cara Mamma (Dear Mom)". Italy placed third in the contest with 209 points.

== Background ==
Prior to the 2016 Contest, Italy had participated in the Junior Eurovision Song Contest twice times since its debut in 2014, having won the contest on their first appearance with the song "Tu primo grande amore", performed by Vincenzo Cantiello.

== Before Junior Eurovision ==
The Italian broadcaster announced on 2 June 2016, that they would be participating at the contest which takes place on 20 November 2016, in Valletta, Malta. The method for selecting their entrant and song was done internally by the national broadcaster, RAI. On 11 October 2016, it was announced that Fiamma Boccia would be representing Italy at the contest with the song "Cara Mamma (Dear Mom)".

== Artist and song information ==
=== Fiamma Boccia ===
Fiamma Boccia
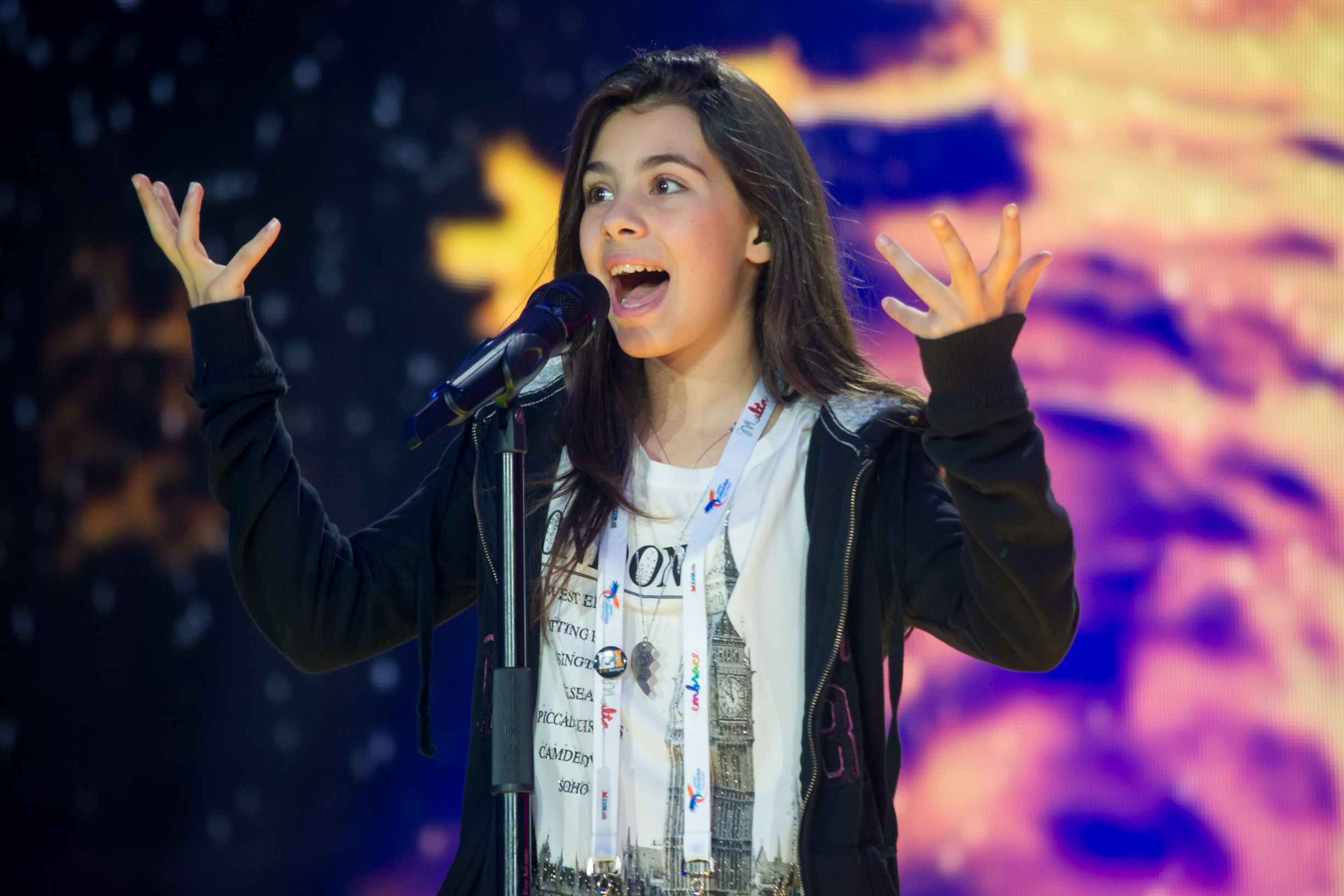

Background information
- Born: 25 November 2003 (age 22); Florence, Italy
- Genres: Pop
- Occupation: Singer
- Instruments: Vocals, piano

Fiamma (born 25 November 2003) is an Italian singer. She represented Italy at the Junior Eurovision Song Contest 2016 in Valletta, Malta, on 20 November 2016 with the song "Cara Mamma", placing third with 209 points.

=== Cara Mamma (Dear Mom) ===
(Italy) "Cara Mamma"
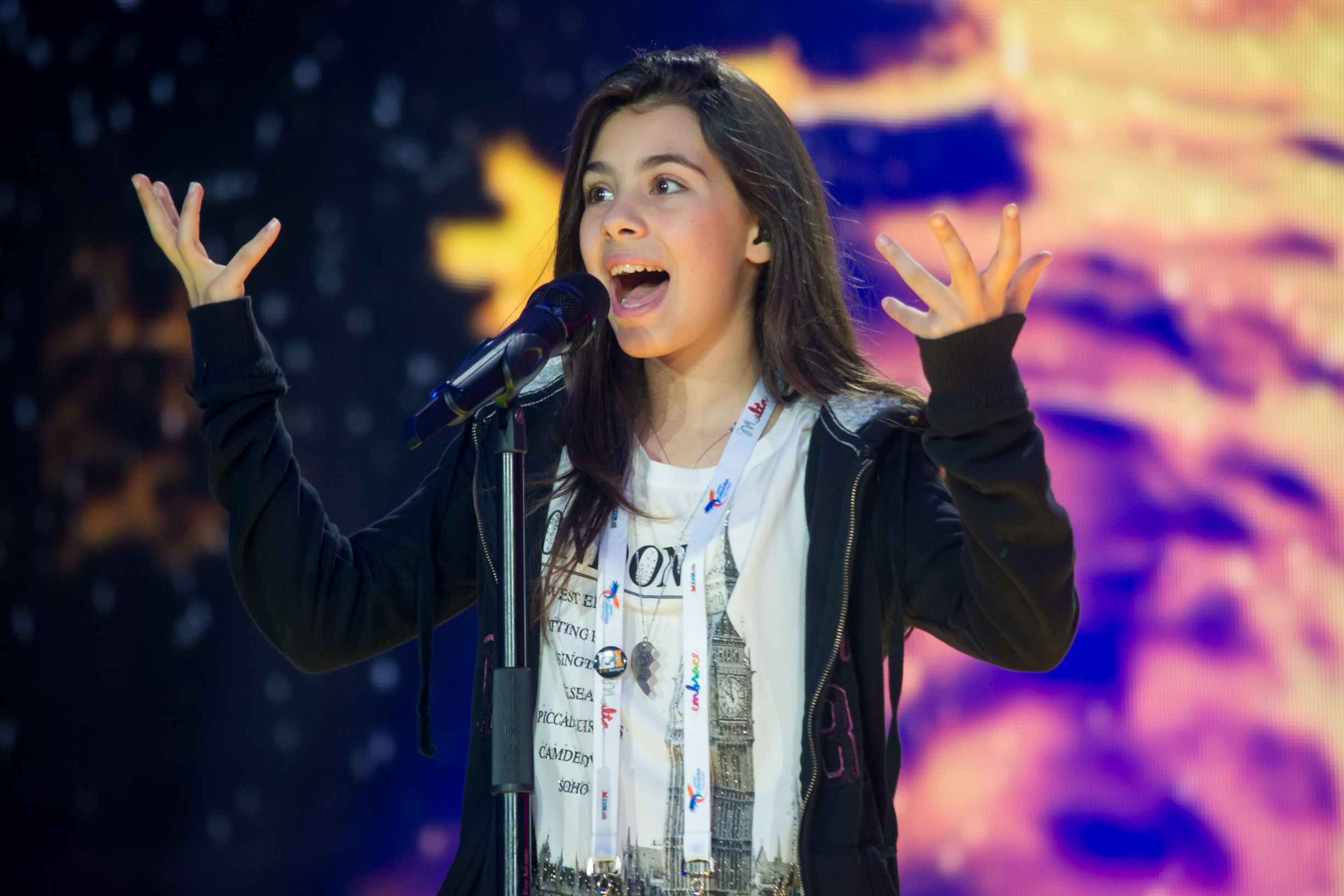

Junior Eurovision Song Contest 2016 entry
- Country: Italy
- Artist: Fiamma Boccia
- Languages: Italian, English
- Composers: Marco Iardella, Francesco Spadoni, Alessandro Ghironi
- Lyricists: Marco Iardella, Francesco Spadoni, Fiamma Boccia

Finals performance
- Final result: 3rd
- Final points: 209 points

Entry chronology
- ◄ "Viva" (2015)

"Cara Mamma" is a song by, Italian singer, Fiamma Boccia. It represented Italy during the Junior Eurovision Song Contest 2016. It is composed by Marco Iardella, Francesco Spadoni and Alessandro Ghironi, while the lyrics were written by Marco Iardella, Francesco Spadoni and Fiamma Boccia herself.

== At Junior Eurovision ==
During the opening ceremony and the running order draw which took place on 14 November 2016, Italy was drawn to perform eleventh on 20 November 2016, following Ukraine and preceding Serbia.

=== Final ===
Italy came third in the final, with 209 points. This is their second best placing after Vincenzo Cantiello's first place in 2014.

=== Voting ===
During the press conference for the Junior Eurovision Song Contest 2016, held in Stockholm, the Reference Group announced several changes to the voting format for the 2016 contest. Previously, points had been awarded based on a combination of 50% National juries and 50% televoting, with one more set of points also given out by a 'Kids' Jury'. However, this year, points will be awarded based on a 50/50 combination of each country's Adult and Kids' Jury, to be announced by a spokesperson. For the first time since the inauguration of the contest the voting procedure will not include a public televote. Following these results, three expert jurors will also announce their points from 1–8, 10, and 12. These professional jurors are: Christer Björkman, Mads Grimstad, and Jedward.

Points awarded to Italy
Score	Adult and expert juries	Kids juries
12 points	Mads Grimstad; Macedonia	Malta; Poland
10 points	Christer Björkman; Ireland	Ireland; Albania
8 points	Albania; Netherlands	Australia; Cyprus
7 points	Israel	Bulgaria; Israel; Macedonia
6 points	Bulgaria; Poland; Ukraine	Belarus
5 points	Cyprus; Russia	Serbia
4 points	Belarus; Georgia	Georgia; Netherlands
3 points		
2 points	Serbia	Russia
1 point	Armenia	Armenia

Points awarded by Italy
Score	Adult jury	Kids jury
12 points	Ireland	Malta
10 points	Malta	Armenia
8 points	Australia	Ireland
7 points	Bulgaria	Australia
6 points	Poland	Russia
5 points	Albania	Belarus
4 points	Netherlands	Israel
3 points	Georgia	Bulgaria
2 points	Russia	Macedonia
1 point	Macedonia	Serbia
