= Ukraine in the Junior Eurovision Song Contest 2016 =

- Junior Eurovision Song Contest 2016
- Country: Ukraine
- Selection process: National selection
- Selection date: Semi-final: 13 August 2016; Final: 10 September 2016

Competing entry
- Song: "Planet Craves For Love"
- Artist: Sofia Rol
- Songwriters: Ruslan Kvinta; Vitalii Kurovskyi; Sandra Bjurman; Yevgeny Matyushenko; Sofia Rol

Placement
- Final result: 14th, 30 points

Participation chronology

Ukraine was represented at the Junior Eurovision Song Contest 2016. The Ukrainian entrant for the 2016 contest in Valletta, Malta was selected through a national selection, organised by the Ukrainian broadcaster National Television Company of Ukraine (NTU). The semi-final took place on 13 August 2016, while the final took place on 10 September 2016. The winner was Sofia Rol with the song "Planet Craves For Love".

== Background ==
Prior to the 2016 Contest, Ukraine had participated in the Junior Eurovision Song Contest ten times since its debut in 2006. Ukraine have never missed a contest since their debut appearance, having won the contest once in 2012 with the song "Nebo", performed by Anastasiya Petryk. The Ukrainian capital Kyiv has hosted the contest twice, at the Palace of Sports in 2009, and the Palace "Ukraine" in 2013.

== Before Junior Eurovision ==
=== National final ===
The Ukrainian broadcaster announced on 8 July 2016, that they would be participating at the contest taking place in Valletta, Malta on 20 November 2016. The semi-final of the national selection for selecting their entrant and song took place on 13 August 2016, while the final will take place on 10 September 2016.

==== Semi-final ====
The semi-final was held in the studios of the national broadcaster NTU on Saturday, 13 August at 10:30 CET. A professional jury selected 12 acts who proceeded to the national final which was due to take place on 10 September.

==== Final ====
The final took place on 10 September 2016, which saw twelve competing acts participating in a televised production where the winner was determined by a 50/50 combination of both public telephone vote and the votes of jury members made up of music professionals. Sofia Rol was selected to represent Ukraine with the song "Planet Craves For Love".

Draw	Artist	Song	Jury	Televote		Total	Place
Draw	Artist	Song	Jury	Votes	Points	Total	Place
1	VoiceLand	"Vidchiny svoye sertse"	3	314	4	7	12
2	Diana Sapozhko	"Tviy svit"	6	598	9	15	5
3	Denis Rodin	"Ukraina – mama moya"	4	1,261	11	15	4
4	Yulia Radchuk	"Moya zorya"	2	326	6	8	10
5	Denis Dovirak & Natalia Sadova	"Ya chekayu dosi svoho lysta"	3	323	5	8	11
6	Alisa Panchuk	"Pyi svoyi mriyi"	7	302	3	10	8
7	Polina Dashkova	"Do Boha"	8	228	2	10	9
8	Anastasiya Baginska	"Miy svit"	12	439	8	20	2
9	Sofia Lozina	"Uhorskyi tanok"	10	225	1	11	7
10	Sofia Rol	"Planet Craves for Love"	11	2,740	12	23	1
11	Andrey Boyko	"Open Your Heart"	9	642	10	19	3
12	Sofia Shkidchenko	"Dolce Vita"	5	337	7	12	6

==== Jury members ====
The jury members were as follow:

- Maria Burmaka - singer and composer
- Svitlana Tarabarova - singer
- Valentyn Koval - general director of the Ukrainian music TV channels M1, M2
- Vadym Lysytsia - composer and producer
- Viktor Knysh - stage director of the Junior Eurovision Song Contest 2013

== Artist and song information ==
=== Sofia Rol ===
Sofia was born on 13 August 2002 in Kyiv, Ukraine. When she was four Sofia started attending the Ukrainian Song and Dance Ensemble, Zerniatko. The following year she attended the Sunflower Show Group, Soniakh, at the Kids and Youth Creativity House in Ukraine.

In 2008 she started working over her first album, Sofia Rol – for the Children of Ukraine which featured songs written by Iryna Kyrylina. The album also included karaoke versions of the songs and was released internationally in November 2009 and became popular with the Ukrainian diaspora.

Despite her young age Sofia already has a wealth of experience at performing at concerts and festivals and has won many prizes. In 2008 she won an award at Sim-Sim Festival in Kyiv and in December that year and in May 2009 she won the Sim-Sim Grand Prize. In June 2009 she won two awards, Popular Vocals and most popular Ukrainian Song at the Zorianyi Symeiiz (Starry Symeiiz) Festival in Yalta. She also won the audience choice award. In 2013 Sofia participated in the same festival, Zorianyi Symeiiz, winning first prize.

In October 2009 Sofia won the Grand Prize at the XIII all-Ukrainian Art Festival of Children and Youth called Funny Autumn Holidays – 2009 held in Kyiv. In 2010 Sofia took part in the television contests Krok Do Zirok (Step to the Stars), Nashchadky (Future Generations) Kumyry Ta Kumyrchyky (Big and Little Idols), Pisennyi Vernisazh (Song Vernissage).

In 2014 Sofia finished first in the Kyiv Art Time Contest and also participated in the Ukrainian national selection for Junior Eurovision. In 2015 she represented Ukraine at the Junior Sanremo Music Festival.

== At Junior Eurovision ==
During the opening ceremony and the running order draw which took place on 14 November 2016, Ukraine was drawn to perform tenth on 20 November 2016, following Belarus and preceding Italy.

=== Voting ===
During the press conference for the Junior Eurovision Song Contest 2016, held in Stockholm, the Reference Group announced several changes to the voting format for the 2016 contest. Previously, points had been awarded based on a combination of 50% National juries and 50% televoting, with one more set of points also given out by a 'Kids' Jury'. However, this year, points will be awarded based on a 50/50 combination of each country's Adult and Kids' Jury, to be announced by a spokesperson. For the first time since the inauguration of the contest the voting procedure will not include a public televote. Following these results, three expert jurors will also announce their points from 1–8, 10, and 12. These professional jurors are: Christer Björkman, Mads Grimstad, and Jedward.

Points awarded to Ukraine
Score	Adult and expert juries	Kids juries
12 points		
10 points		
8 points		
7 points		
6 points		
5 points	Georgia	
4 points	Poland	Belarus; Bulgaria
3 points	Armenia; Israel	Malta
2 points	Bulgaria	
1 point	Netherlands	Australia

Points awarded by Ukraine
Score	Adult jury	Kids jury
12 points	Georgia	Georgia
10 points	Ireland	Netherlands
8 points	Netherlands	Russia
7 points	Australia	Ireland
6 points	Italy	Belarus
5 points	Malta	Armenia
4 points	Russia	Australia
3 points	Bulgaria	Malta
2 points	Armenia	Bulgaria
1 point	Israel	Albania
