= Kids Jury in the Junior Eurovision Song Contest =

The use of a Kids' Jury in the Junior Eurovision Song Contest was first introduced at the Junior Eurovision Song Contest 2012, in Amsterdam, Netherlands, as part of a new voting system for the Junior Eurovision Song Contest following discussions between the European Broadcasting Union (EBU), KidsRights Foundation, and the Junior Eurovision Song Contest 2012 host broadcaster Algemene Vereniging Radio Omroep (AVRO). Three of the four spokespersons who announced the jury points at each annual contest were former winners of the Junior Eurovision Song Contest. As of 2016, the results of each country's Kids' Jury have been integrated with the adult jury to give out two sets of 1–8, 10, and 12 points per country.

== History ==
On 15 October 2012, it was announced by the European Broadcasting Union (EBU), that for the first time in the contest's history a new "Kids' Jury" was being introduced into the voting system. The jury would consist of members aged between 10 and 15, and representing each of the participating countries competing in a contest. A spokesperson from the jury would then announce the points 1–8, 10 and the maximum 12 as decided upon by the jury members.

Sietse Bakker who was the Junior Eurovision Executive Supervisor at the time, in conjunction with members of the European Broadcasting Union (EBU), KidsRights Foundation, and the Junior Eurovision Song Contest 2012 host broadcaster Algemene Vereniging Radio Omroep (AVRO), held a press conference on 30 November 2012, in which further details were released in regards to the newly implemented "Kids' Jury". The spokesperson from the jury was the first to reveal the votes during the interval act of the live show. This gave a new dimension to the voting procedure, since the contest first began in 2003.

In 2016, each country was represented by an adult jury and a kids jury. These results were combined to form the scores from each country.

== Spokespersons ==
The table below lists each of the spokespersons who announced the Kids' Jury points at each annual contest.

Year(s)	Host city	Spokesperson	Notes
2012	(Netherlands) Amsterdam	Ralf Mackenbach	Winner of the Junior Eurovision Song Contest 2009 for the Netherlands.
2013	(Ukraine) Kyiv	Anastasiya Petryk	Winner of the Junior Eurovision Song Contest 2012 for Ukraine.
2014	Malta (Note: Although the venue itself is located in Marsa, Malta, the Junior Eurovision Executive Supervisor, Vladislav Yakovlev stated on 18 December 2013 that there would be "no host city - but a host island".)	Gaia Cauchi	Winner of the Junior Eurovision Song Contest 2013 for Malta.
2015	(Bulgaria) Sofia	Krisia Todorova	Runner-up at the Junior Eurovision Song Contest 2014 for Bulgaria.

== See also ==
- Voting in the Eurovision Song Contest – Information on the voting systems used throughout the history of the Eurovision Song Contest.
