= Armenia in the Junior Eurovision Song Contest 2014 =

- Junior Eurovision Song Contest 2014
- Country: Armenia
- Selection process: National Final
- Selection date: 14 September 2014

Competing entry
- Song: "People of the Sun"
- Artist: Betty

Placement
- Final result: 3rd, 146 points

Participation chronology

Armenia was represented at the Junior Eurovision Song Contest 2014 which took place on 15 November 2014, in Marsa, Malta. The Armenian broadcaster Armenia 1 (ARMTV) was responsible for organising their entry for the contest. The Armenian entry was selected through a national final held on 14 September 2014. Betty and her song "People of the Sun" was chosen to represent the nation in Marsa, Malta.

Armenia finished 3rd in the final with 146 points.

== Background ==
Prior to the 2014 Contest, Armenia had participated in the Junior Eurovision Song Contest seven times since its first entry in 2007, with their best result being in 2010 when they won with the song "Mama", performed by Vladimir Arzumanyan. Armenia went on to host the Junior Eurovision Song Contest 2011, in the Armenian capital, Yerevan.

== Before Junior Eurovision ==
=== National Selection ===
On 29 May 2014, ARMTV announced that a national final would be held to select Armenia's entry for the Junior Eurovision Song Contest 2014. A submission period for artists was held from 1 June 2014 to 15 August 2014. The broadcaster received 87 submissions. The ten finalists were revealed on 5 September 2014, while the running order was decided on 11 September.

==== Final ====
The national selection took place on 14 September 2014. Betty won with the song "People Of The Sun" and thus, Betty was chosen to represent Armenia.

Draw	Artist	Song	Jury	Televote	Total	Place
1	Mery Kocharyan	"Chi kareli"	7	2	9	3
2	Yuna	"Walk Around"	5	4	9	4
3	Arman Simonyan & Elina Cholakhyan	"Galaxy"	10	3	13	9
4	Narek	"Ashun"	2	9	11	7
5	Mery M	"#Peace"	8	1	9	2
6	Srbuhi feat. DDJ	"Zurna"	3	8	11	6
7	Mika	"Mankutyan khorhurd"	4	5	9	5
8	Suzy	"I Dream"	9	10	19	10
9	Karen Ohanyan feat. Mika	"Shine Out"	6	6	12	8
10	Betty	"People of the Sun"	1	7	8	1

== At Junior Eurovision ==
At the running order draw which took place on 9 November 2014, Armenia were drawn to perform twelfth on 15 November 2014, following Italy and preceding Russia.

=== Voting ===
Points awarded to Armenia
Score	Country
12 points (Note: All countries received one set of 12 points to ensure no country finished with nul points.)	Belarus; Bulgaria; Georgia; Malta; Russia; Ukraine
10 points	Netherlands
8 points	Slovenia; Sweden
7 points	Kids Jury; San Marino
6 points	Croatia; Cyprus; Serbia
5 points	
4 points	
3 points	
2 points	Italy; Montenegro
1 point	

Points awarded by Armenia
Score	Country
12 points	Georgia
10 points	Russia
8 points	Italy
7 points	Bulgaria
6 points	Malta
5 points	Netherlands
4 points	Ukraine
3 points	Belarus
2 points	Slovenia
1 point	Sweden

==== Detailed voting results ====
The following members comprised the Armenian jury:

- Aram Sargsyan (Aram Mp3)
- Armina Darbinyan
- Zaruhi Babayan
- Alla Levonyan
- Erik Karapetyan

Detailed voting results from Armenia
Draw	Country	A. Sargsyan	A. Darbinyan	Z. Babayan	A. Levonyan	E. Karapetyan	Average Jury Points	Televoting Points	Points Awarded
01	Belarus	5	6	4	8	7	5	4	3
02	Bulgaria	7	7	7	6	5	6	8	7
03	San Marino								
04	Croatia								
05	Cyprus		1			2		1	
06	Georgia	10	12	10	12	10	12	10	12
07	Sweden	3			2	1	2		1
08	Ukraine	1	3	2	3	3	3	6	4
09	Slovenia							2	2
10	Montenegro	4		1	1		1		
11	Italy	8	8	6	7	12	8	7	8
12	Armenia								
13	Russia	2	5	5	5	4	4	12	10
14	Serbia		2	3					
15	Malta	6	10	12	10	8	10	3	6
16	Netherlands	12	4	8	4	6	7	5	5
