= Georgia in the Junior Eurovision Song Contest 2014 =

- Junior Eurovision Song Contest 2014
- Country: Georgia
- Selection process: Internal selection
- Announcement date: Artist: 16 August 2014; Song: 29 September 2014

Competing entry
- Song: "Happy Day"
- Artist: Lizi Pop

Placement
- Final result: 11th, 54 points

Participation chronology

Georgia was represented at the Junior Eurovision Song Contest 2014 which took place on 15 November 2014, in Marsa, Malta. Georgian Public Broadcaster (GPB) was responsible for organising their entry for the contest. Lizi Pop was internally selected to represent Georgia in the contest with the song "Happy Day".

== Background ==
Prior to the 2014 Contest, Georgia had participated in the Junior Eurovision Song Contest seven times since its debut in 2007. They have never missed an edition of the contest, and have won twice at the 2008 and 2011 contests.

== Before Junior Eurovision ==
Georgian broadcaster GPB decided to internally select their 2014 artist after holding an open audition. It was originally announced on 14 August 2014 that Liza Japaridze, Sofi Dashniani, and Dea Dashniani would represent Georgia as a trio, however on 16 August 2014 it was revealed that Japaridze would perform under the stage name Lizi Pop, while the Dashnianis will be backing singers.

== At Junior Eurovision ==
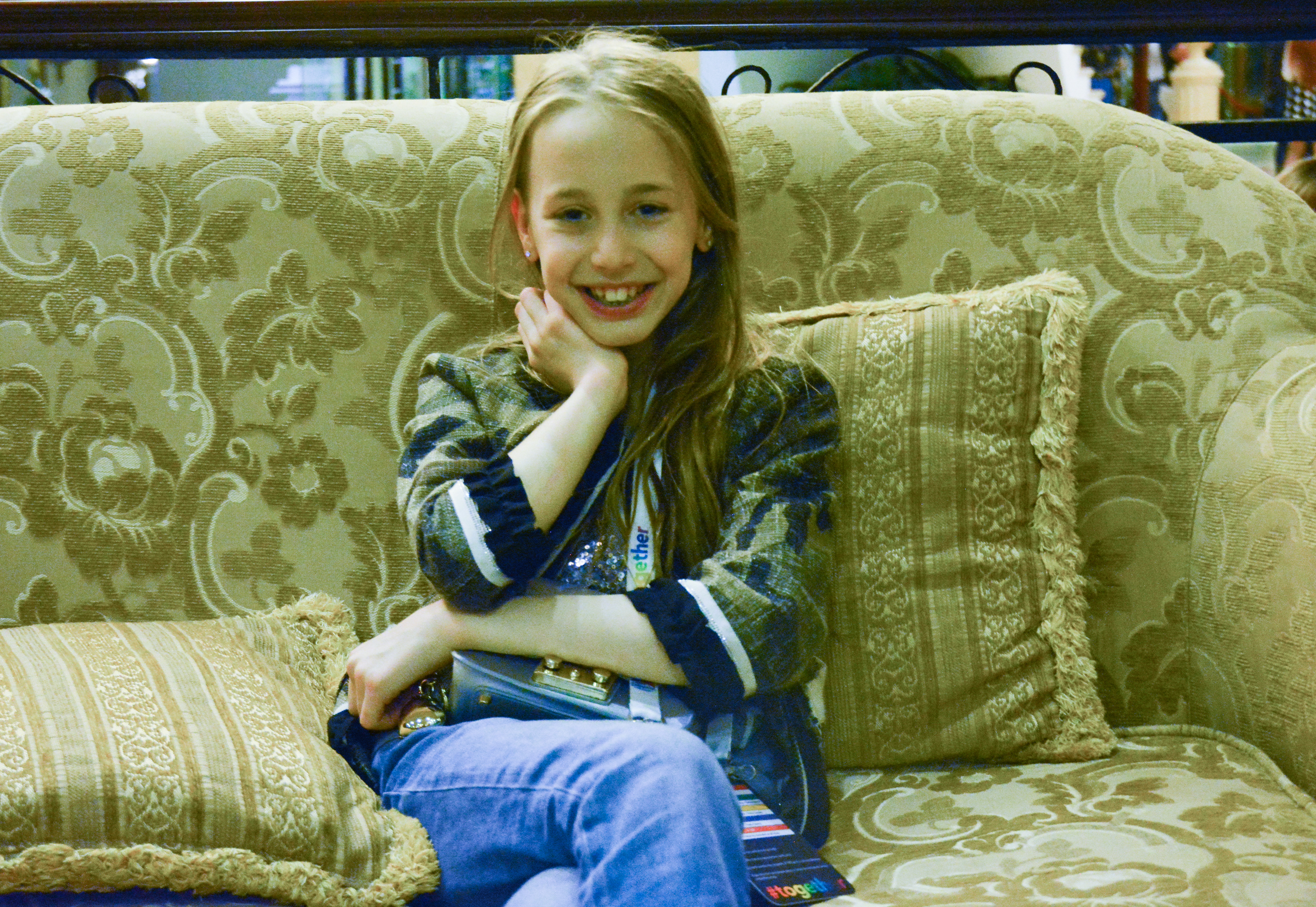
Lizi Pop at the Junior Eurovision Song Contest 2014.

At the running order draw which took place on 9 November 2014, Georgia were drawn to perform sixth on 15 November 2014, following Cyprus and preceding Sweden.

=== Final ===
Lizi Pop performed with four background dancers in black outfits with white wigs. During the performance, Lizi Pop encouraged the members of the audience to sing along.

At the end of the voting, Georgia placed 11th with 54 points.

=== Voting ===
Points awarded to Georgia
| Score | Country |
|---|---|
| 12 points (Note: All countries received one set of 12 points to ensure no country finished with nul points.) | Armenia |
| 10 points | |
| 8 points | |
| 7 points | Malta |
| 6 points | |
| 5 points | Russia |
| 4 points | Belarus |
| 3 points | Cyprus |
| 2 points | Bulgaria; Netherlands; San Marino; Ukraine |
| 1 point | Croatia; Kids Jury; Serbia |

Points awarded by Georgia
| Score | Country |
|---|---|
| 12 points | Armenia |
| 10 points | Italy |
| 8 points | Bulgaria |
| 7 points | Ukraine |
| 6 points | Belarus |
| 5 points | Malta |
| 4 points | Cyprus |
| 3 points | Russia |
| 2 points | Netherlands |
| 1 point | Sweden |

==== Detailed voting results ====
The following members comprised the Georgian jury:

- Chabuki Amiranashvili
- Archil Nijardze
- Sopho Gelovani
- Mariam Ebralidze
- Lasha Kapanadze

Detailed voting results from Georgia
| Draw | Country | C. Amiranashvili | A. Nijardze | S. Gelovani | M. Ebralidze | L. Kapanadze | Average Jury Points | Televoting Points | Points Awarded |
|---|---|---|---|---|---|---|---|---|---|
| 01 | Belarus | 7 | 8 | 7 | 8 | 6 | 8 | 4 | 6 |
| 02 | Bulgaria | | 10 | | 6 | 7 | 6 | 10 | 8 |
| 03 | San Marino | 4 | 4 | 1 | | | | | |
| 04 | Croatia | 5 | | 3 | | | | | |
| 05 | Cyprus | 10 | 2 | 5 | 4 | 1 | 5 | 3 | 4 |
| 06 | Georgia | | | | | | | | |
| 07 | Sweden | 3 | 6 | | 2 | 3 | 3 | | 1 |
| 08 | Ukraine | 8 | | 12 | 3 | 5 | 7 | 8 | 7 |
| 09 | Slovenia | | | | | | | | |
| 10 | Montenegro | | | | | | | | |
| 11 | Italy | 12 | 12 | 4 | 12 | 12 | 12 | 7 | 10 |
| 12 | Armenia | 6 | 5 | 10 | 10 | 10 | 10 | 12 | 12 |
| 13 | Russia | | | 8 | | 4 | | 5 | 3 |
| 14 | Serbia | | 3 | | 7 | 2 | 1 | 1 | |
| 15 | Malta | 1 | 1 | 6 | 5 | 8 | 4 | 6 | 5 |
| 16 | Netherlands | 2 | 7 | 2 | 1 | | 2 | 2 | 2 |
