= Netherlands in the Junior Eurovision Song Contest 2014 =

2014 Junior Eurovision participation

- Junior Eurovision Song Contest 2014
- Country: Netherlands
- Selection process: Junior Songfestival 2014; 33% Jury; 33% Kids Jury; 33% Televoting
- Selection date: Semi-finals: 13 September 2014; 20 September 2014; Final: 27 September 2014

Competing entry
- Song: "Around"
- Artist: Julia

Placement
- Final result: 8th, 70 points

Participation chronology

The Netherlands selected their Junior Eurovision Song Contest 2014 entry through Junior Songfestival, a national selection consisting of eight songs. The competing songs were broken down into two semi-finals taking place on 13 and 20 September 2014. The winner was announced to be Julia van Bergen (credited as Julia) with her song "Around" on 27 September 2014. The expert jury consisted of Xander de Buisonjé, Niels Geusebroek, and Yvonne Coldeweijer.

== Before Junior Eurovision ==
=== Junior Songfestival 2014 ===
From each semi-final two entries qualified for the final based on the decision of adult and kids juries as well as televoting. The fifth entry in the final was chosen by online voting (web wildcard).

==== Competing entries ====
Artist	Song	Songwriter(s)
Anne & Anique	"Dromen"	Anne Loos, Anique Kamerik, Hansen Tomas, Robert Dorn
Beau	"De wind"	Beau van Cleef, Kirsten Schneider, Mark Erickson, Eric Van Tijn
Bobby & Ella	"Hard to Explain"	Bobby Hunter, Ella van den Hurk, Nando Eweg, Hansen Tomas, Joost Griffioen, Peter Kvint
Chelsea	"Waarom"	Chelsea Hegener, Stephan Geusebroek, Tjeerd Van Zanen
Julia	"Around"	Robert Dorn, Joost Griffioen, Julia van Bergen
Sebastiaan	"2gether We Are One"	Sebastiaan Reddering, Tjeerd Oosterhuis
Sem	"Jij staat op nummer 1"	Sem Blom, Ed Struijlaart
Suze	"Holiday"	Suze van der Meijden, Eric van Tijn, Jochem Fluitsma, Joos van Leeuwen, Rachel Vermeulen

Table key
Participants who qualified to the final via jury and televoting.
Participants who qualified to the final via wildcard

==== Semi-final 1 ====
Semi-final 1 – 13 September 2014
Draw	Artist	Song	Kids Jury	Jury	Televote	Total	Place
1	Suze	"Holiday"	12	12	10	34	1
2	Sem	"Jij staat op nummer 1"	9	10	8	27	3
3	Chelsea	"Waarom"	10	8	12	30	2
4	Bobby & Ella	"Hard to Explain"	8	9	9	26	4

==== Semi-final 2 ====
Semi-final 2 – 20 September 2014
Draw	Artist	Song	Kids Jury	Jury	Televote	Total	Place
1	Sebastiaan	"2gether We Are One"	10	10	8	28	2
2	Anne & Anique	"Dromen"	9	9	9	27	3
3	Beau	"De wind"	8	8	10	26	4
4	Julia	"Around"	12	12	12	36	1

==== Final ====
Final – 27 September 2014
Draw	Artist	Song	Kids Jury	Jury	Televote	Total	Place
1	Anne & Anique	"Dromen"	7	7	7	21	5
2	Suze	"Holiday"	8	9	9	26	3
3	Chelsea	"Waarom"	10	10	10	30	2
4	Julia	"Around"	12	12	12	36	1
5	Sebastiaan	"2gether We Are One"	9	8	8	25	4

== At Junior Eurovision ==
At the running order draw which took place on 9 November 2014, the Netherlands were drawn to perform last on 15 November 2014, following host country Malta. The Netherlands finished 8th in the final with 70 points. The Netherlands placed 6th in the televoting with 69 points, while the jury vote placed the Netherlands 9th with 44 points.

=== Voting ===
Points awarded to the Netherlands
Score	Country
12 points (Note: All countries received one set of 12 points to ensure no country finished with nul points.)	Sweden
10 points	
8 points	
7 points	Italy
6 points	
5 points	Armenia; Belarus; Cyprus
4 points	Croatia; San Marino
3 points	Bulgaria; Serbia
2 points	Georgia; Kids Jury; Malta; Russia
1 point	Montenegro; Ukraine

Points awarded by the Netherlands
Score	Country
12 points	Bulgaria
10 points	Armenia
8 points	Italy
7 points	Belarus
6 points	Cyprus
5 points	Sweden
4 points	Slovenia
3 points	Ukraine
2 points	Georgia
1 point	Malta

==== Detailed voting results ====
The following members comprised the Dutch jury:

- Rachel Traets
- Kirsten Schneider
- Guido van Gend
- Monique Smit
- Tim Douwsma

Detailed voting results from the Netherlands
Draw	Country	R. Traets	K. Schneider	G. van Gend	M. Smit	T. Douwsma	Average Jury Points	Televoting Points	Points Awarded
01	Belarus	8	8	6	8	7	8	5	7
02	Bulgaria	10	10	8	5	6	10	12	12
03	San Marino								
04	Croatia								
05	Cyprus	6	2	4	7	12	5	7	6
06	Georgia	4	4		6	2	4		2
07	Sweden	7	6	12	4	4	6	3	5
08	Ukraine	1	1	5		3	2	4	3
09	Slovenia				2			6	4
10	Montenegro								
11	Italy	5	7	7	10	8	7	8	8
12	Armenia	12	12	10	12	10	12	10	10
13	Russia	2	5	2		5	3		
14	Serbia	3		1	1	1		1	
15	Malta		3	3	3		1	2	1
16	Netherlands								

== Julia van Bergen ==
Julia van Bergen (born 17 September 1999 in Harderwijk), also known as Julia, is a Dutch singer. She represented The Netherlands in the Junior Eurovision Song Contest 2014 in Malta with the song "Around". Since then, singles have included "Round And Around" (2015), "Baby Come Home" (2015) and "The One" (2016). In 2017/2018, Julia was a contestant on The voice of Holland, reaching the Knock Out phase.
