= Ukraine in the Junior Eurovision Song Contest 2014 =

- Junior Eurovision Song Contest 2014
- Country: Ukraine
- Selection process: National final
- Selection date: 9 August 2014

Competing entry
- Song: "Pryyde vesna"
- Artist: Sympho-Nick

Placement
- Final result: 6th, 74 points

Participation chronology

Ukraine selected its entry for the Junior Eurovision Song Contest 2014 through a national final that consisted of eighteen songs. The final was held on 9 August 2014 in Bukovel, Ukraine. Sympho-Nick and their song "Pryyde vesna" (Прийде весна) were chosen as the winner.

== Before Junior Eurovision ==
=== National final ===
The final took place on 9 August 2014 and featured eighteen competing acts in a televised production. The winner was determined by a 50/50 combination of public telephone votes and jury votes from music professionals. Sympho-Nick was selected to represent Ukraine with the song "Pryyde vesna".

Draw	Artist	Song	Jury	Televote		Total	Place
Draw	Artist	Song	Jury	Votes	Points	Total	Place
1	Anna Trincher	"Nebo znaye"	10	235	7	17	13
2	Zvezdnaya Kapel	"Oberih"	5	91	3	8	17
3	Anna Likhota	"Vohon"	8	207	6	14	14
4	Fresh	"Angely svitla"	11	512	10	21	11
5	Veronika Yerokhova	"Znov shchaslyva ya"	6	43	1	7	18
6	Viktorya Svyatohor	"Ya molyusya za tebe"	14	554	13	27	5
7	Double Smile	"Omriyana zemlya"	9	596	15	24	8
8	Yaryna Taras	"Moya Ukrayino"	14	491	9	23	10
9	Stasy MJ	"Povernit' moyu mriyu"	12	577	14	26	6
10	Denys Frolov	"Sontse"	13	540	11	24	7
11	Nina & Vasya Boykovy	"Moya stykhiya"	17	662	16	33	2
12	Smile	"Up and Down"	16	900	17	33	3
13	Sofia Rol	"V tvoyikh dolonyakh vse"	15	541	12	27	4
14	Yelyzaveta Zadoya	"Vesna"	9	84	2	11	16
15	Sofia Yaremova	"We're Ukraine"	7	190	5	12	15
16	Maria Tarnavska	"Doroha do lyubovy"	15	294	8	23	9
17	Sympho-Nick	"Pryyde vesna"	18	1,412	18	36	1
18	Yuliana Vasilovska	"Tviy nomer odyn"	14	139	4	18	12

== At Junior Eurovision ==
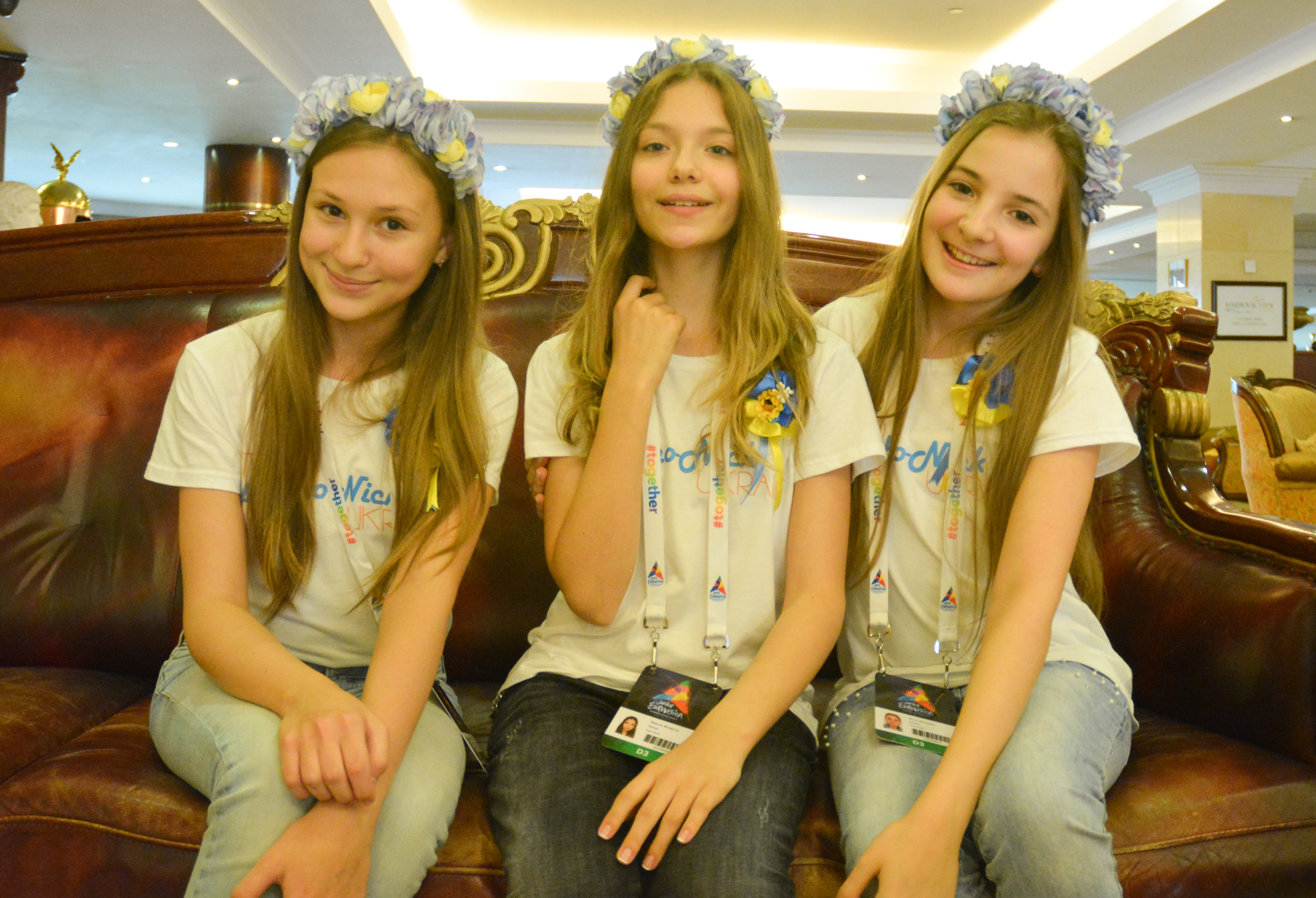
Interview of Sympho-Nick for kidsmusic.info at Junior Eurovision Song Contest 2014

At the running order draw which took place on 9 November 2014, Ukraine were drawn to perform eighth on 15 November 2014, following Sweden and preceding Slovenia.

=== Voting ===
Points awarded to Ukraine
Score	Country
12 points (Note: All countries received one set of 12 points to ensure no country finished with nul points.)	
10 points	Montenegro
8 points	
7 points	Croatia; Georgia
6 points	Belarus
5 points	Serbia
4 points	Armenia; Bulgaria; Cyprus; Malta; Russia
3 points	Italy; Netherlands
2 points	
1 point	Slovenia

Points awarded by Ukraine
Score	Country
12 points	Armenia
10 points	Italy
8 points	Bulgaria
7 points	Malta
6 points	Belarus
5 points	Russia
4 points	Serbia
3 points	Sweden
2 points	Georgia
1 point	Netherlands

==== Detailed voting results ====
The following members comprised the Ukrainian jury:

- Olexandr Zlotnyk
- Andrii Yakumenko (Andre France)
- Kateryna Pryshchepa (Illaria)
- Alla Popova
- Kateryna Komar

Detailed voting results from Ukraine
Draw	Country	O. Zlotnyk	A. Yakumenko	K. Pryshchepa	A. Popova	K. Komar	Average Jury Points	Televoting Points	Points Awarded
01	Belarus	6	6	6	6	6	6	7	6
02	Bulgaria	1	1	8	1	10	5	10	8
03	San Marino								
04	Croatia								
05	Cyprus			7		7	1	1	
06	Georgia							6	2
07	Sweden	8	8	5	8	4	7		3
08	Ukraine								
09	Slovenia	2	2		2			2	
10	Montenegro	5	5		5		2		
11	Italy	12	12	10	12	12	12	4	10
12	Armenia	4	4	4	4	1	4	12	12
13	Russia	3	3	2	3	5	3	8	5
14	Serbia	10	10	3	10	3	8		4
15	Malta	7	7	12	7	8	10	5	7
16	Netherlands			1		2		3	1
