= San Marino in the Junior Eurovision Song Contest 2014 =

- Junior Eurovision Song Contest 2014
- Country: San Marino
- Selection process: Internal selection
- Announcement date: Artist: 26 September 2014; Song: 29 September 2014

Competing entry
- Song: "Breaking My Heart"
- Artist: The Peppermints

Placement
- Final result: 15th, 21 points

Participation chronology

San Marino selected their Junior Eurovision Song Contest 2014 entry through an internal selection. On 26 September 2014 it was revealed that The Peppermints would represent San Marino in the contest with the song "Breaking My Heart".

== Internal selection ==
On 26 September 2014, it was revealed that the Italian/Sammarinese girl band The Peppermints, would represent San Marino with song named "Breaking My Heart". The state broadcaster San Marino RTV established a partnership with the youth singing contest "Vocine Nuove di Castrocaro" (New Little Voices of Castrocaro) to select the group's members.

== Band Members ==
The band is formed of Raffaella Perniola from Palagiano, Greta Doveri from Cascine di Buti, Anita Simoncini from Montegiardino, Arianna Ulivi from Galeata and Sara Dall'Olio from Cervia. Raffaella and Greta were 14 at the time of the performance and Anita, Arianna and Sara were aged 15. Greta previously won the Sanremo Music Festival Junior competition, having competed in the TV talent show Io canto. Raffaella's brother participated in Junior Eurovision Song Contest 2013.

== Song ==
Their song "Breaking My Heart" was written by Antonello Carozza, Chris Lapolla and Luca Medri. The music was composed by Chris Lapolla and Luca Medri. The lyrics for the song are partially in Italian and partially in English.

== At Junior Eurovision ==
At the running order draw which took place on 9 November 2014, San Marino were drawn to perform third on 15 November 2014, following Bulgaria and preceding Croatia.

The group finished in 15th position, receiving a total of 21 points.

=== Voting ===
Points awarded to San Marino
Score	Country
12 points (Note: All countries received one set of 12 points to ensure no country finished with nul points.)	
10 points	
8 points	Italy
7 points	
6 points	
5 points	
4 points	
3 points	
2 points	
1 point	Malta

Points awarded by San Marino
Score	Country
12 points	Italy
10 points	Malta
8 points	Cyprus
7 points	Armenia
6 points	Serbia
5 points	Russia
4 points	Netherlands
3 points	Belarus
2 points	Georgia
1 point	Croatia

==== Detailed voting results ====
The Sammarinese votes in this final were based on 100% jury. The following members comprised the Sammarinese jury:

- Fausto Giacomini
- Lorena Chiarelli
- Monica Moroni
- Andrea Gattei
- Alessia Mangano

Detailed voting results from San Marino
Draw	Country	F. Giacomini	L. Chiarelli	M. Moroni	A. Gattei	A. Mangano	Points Awarded
01	Belarus	1	4	6	4		3
02	Bulgaria	5			2	5	
03	San Marino						
04	Croatia				10	2	1
05	Cyprus	12	10	4		6	8
06	Georgia			1	6	7	2
07	Sweden		7	3			
08	Ukraine	2	1	7		1	
09	Slovenia		3		5		
10	Montenegro						
11	Italy	10	2	12	8	10	12
12	Armenia	6	5	8	1	8	7
13	Russia	7	6	2	7	3	5
14	Serbia	8	12		3	4	6
15	Malta	3		10	12	12	10
16	Netherlands	4	8	5			4
