= Russia in the Junior Eurovision Song Contest 2014 =

- Junior Eurovision Song Contest 2014
- Country: Russia
- Selection process: Internal selection
- Announcement date: Artist: 22 September 2014; Song: 29 September 2014

Competing entry
- Song: "Dreamer"
- Artist: Alisa Kozhikina
- Songwriters: Alisa Kozhikina; Maxim Fadeev; Olga Seryabkina

Placement
- Final result: 5th, 96 points

Participation chronology

Russia selected their Junior Eurovision Song Contest 2014 entry through an internal selection. On 22 September 2014 it was revealed that Alisa Kozhikina would represent Russia in the contest. On 24 September 2014, it was announced that the name of her song would be "Dreamer".

== Before Junior Eurovision ==
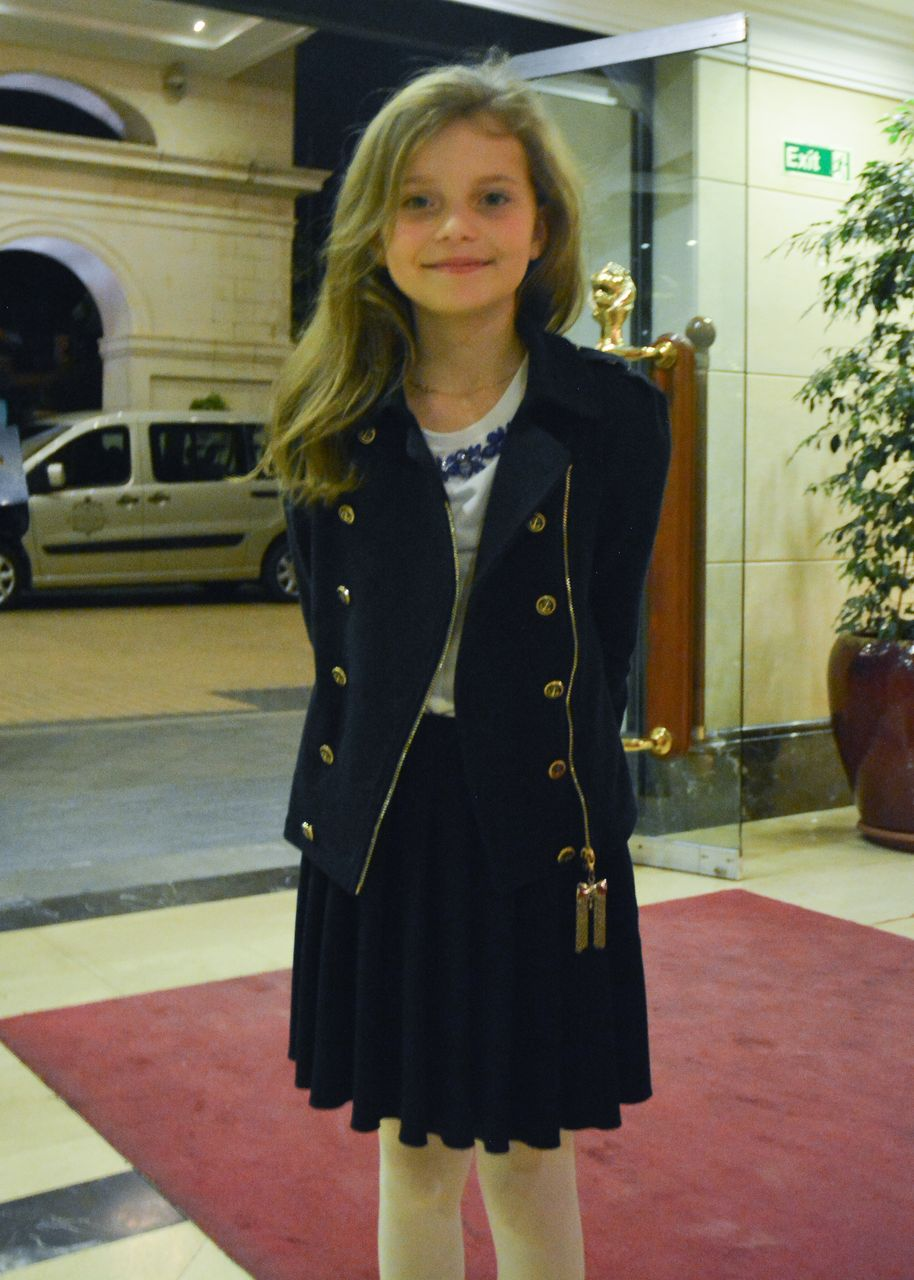
Alisa Kozhikina was internally selected by VGTRK to represent Russia

On 22 September 2014, it was revealed that 11-year-old Alisa Kozhikina would represent Russia with the song "Dreamer". Kozhikina is the winner of Golos. Deti, the Russian version the international The Voice Kids format. The song was released on 29 September 2014 via the Junioreurovision.tv website. Prior to Kozhikina's selection, Arina Danilova was also named a potential entrant by Russian media outlet Yasia.

The song is sung in Russian, with the final chorus being in English, and was written by Maxim Fadeev, Olga Seryabkina and Kozhikina herself. Seryabkina previously represented Russia in the Eurovision Song Contest 2007 as part of girl group Serebro.

== At Junior Eurovision ==
At the running order draw which took place on 9 November 2014, Russia were drawn to perform thirteenth on 15 November 2014, following Armenia and preceding Serbia.

=== Voting ===
Points awarded to Russia
Score	Country
12 points (Note: All countries received one set of 12 points to ensure no country finished with nul points.)	
10 points	Armenia; Belarus; Serbia
8 points	Cyprus
7 points	Bulgaria; Slovenia
6 points	
5 points	Croatia; Kids Jury; Montenegro; San Marino; Ukraine
4 points	
3 points	Georgia; Malta
2 points	
1 point	Sweden

Points awarded by Russia
Score	Country
12 points	Armenia
10 points	Malta
8 points	Belarus
7 points	Bulgaria
6 points	Italy
5 points	Georgia
4 points	Ukraine
3 points	Cyprus
2 points	Netherlands
1 point	Serbia

==== Detailed voting results ====
The following members comprised the Russian jury:

- Oksana Fedorova
- Julia Nachalova
- Yury Entin
- Margarita Sukhankina
- Nikita Presniakov

Detailed voting results from Russia
Draw	Country	O. Fedorova	J. Nachalova	Y. Entin	M. Sukhankina	N. Presniakov	Average Jury Points	Televoting Points	Points Awarded
01	Belarus	5	7	5	12	7	7	10	8
02	Bulgaria	6	2	6	5		4	8	7
03	San Marino			2					
04	Croatia	2	3	1	1	3	2		
05	Cyprus	4	6	3	6	2	5	1	3
06	Georgia	8		7	8	8	6	3	5
07	Sweden	3		4					
08	Ukraine				3	4	1	6	4
09	Slovenia							2	
10	Montenegro		1						
11	Italy	7	12	8	7	6	8	4	6
12	Armenia	12	8	12	4	12	10	12	12
13	Russia								
14	Serbia	1	5		2	5	3		1
15	Malta	10	10	10	10	10	12	7	10
16	Netherlands		4			1		5	2
