= Serbia in the Junior Eurovision Song Contest 2014 =

- Junior Eurovision Song Contest 2014
- Country: Serbia
- Selection process: Internal selection
- Announcement date: 1 October 2014

Competing entry
- Song: "Svet u mojim očima"
- Artist: Emilija Đonin

Placement
- Final result: 10th, 61 points

Participation chronology

Serbia selected their Junior Eurovision Song Contest 2014 entry through an internal selection. On 1 October 2014 it was revealed that Emilija Đonin would represent Serbia in the contest with the song "Svet u mojim očima".

== Internal selection ==
On 1 October 2014, it was revealed that the Serbian teen singer Emilija Đonin, would represent Serbia with the song "Svet u mojim očima".

== At Junior Eurovision ==
At the running order draw which took place on 9 November 2014, Serbia were drawn to perform fourteenth on 15 November 2014, following Russia and preceding host country Malta.

=== Voting ===
Points awarded to Serbia
Score	Country
12 points (Note: All countries received one set of 12 points to ensure no country finished with nul points.)	
10 points	
8 points	Croatia
7 points	Montenegro
6 points	Bulgaria; Italy; San Marino
5 points	Slovenia
4 points	Ukraine
3 points	Kids Jury; Sweden
2 points	
1 point	Russia

Points awarded by Serbia
Score	Country
12 points	Bulgaria
10 points	Russia
8 points	Italy
7 points	Malta
6 points	Armenia
5 points	Ukraine
4 points	Montenegro
3 points	Netherlands
2 points	Slovenia
1 point	Georgia

==== Detailed voting results ====
The following members comprised the Serbian jury:

- Slobodan Marković
- Dejan Cukić
- Jelena Tomašević
- Marija Marić Marković
- Ivona Menzalin

Detailed voting results from Serbia
Draw	Country	S. Marković	D. Cukić	J. Tomašević	M. Marić Marković	I. Menzalin	Average Jury Points	Televoting Points	Points Awarded
01	Belarus	5	4	7			3		
02	Bulgaria	7	7		7	6	7	12	12
03	San Marino	2							
04	Croatia			1	1	3			
05	Cyprus	4		3				1	
06	Georgia	3	5	5	2	1	4		1
07	Sweden								
08	Ukraine		3		5	2	1	10	5
09	Slovenia		2	4	4	4	2	2	2
10	Montenegro		1	2	6	7	5	6	4
11	Italy	8	10	10	10	10	10	5	8
12	Armenia	6	6	6	3	5	6	7	6
13	Russia	10	8	8	8	8	8	8	10
14	Serbia								
15	Malta	12	12	12	12	12	12	3	7
16	Netherlands	1						4	3
