= Sweden in the Junior Eurovision Song Contest 2014 =

- Junior Eurovision Song Contest 2014
- Participating broadcaster: Sveriges Television (SVT)
- Country: Sweden
- Selection process: Lilla Melodifestivalen 2014
- Selection date: 6 June 2014

Competing entry
- Song: "Du är inte ensam"
- Artist: Julia Kedhammar
- Songwriters: Thomas G:son; Julia Kedhammar

Placement
- Final result: 13th, 28 points

Participation chronology

Sweden was represented at the Junior Eurovision Song Contest 2014 with the song "Du är inte ensam", written by Thomas G:son and Julia Kedhammar, and performed by Kedhammar herself. The Swedish participating broadcaster, Sveriges Television (SVT), organised Lilla Melodifestivalen 2014 to select its entry for the contest.

== Lilla Melodifestivalen 2014 ==
=== Final ===
The final, which consisted of eight songs, was held on 6 June 2014 at the Gröna Lund amusement park in Stockholm. Julia Kedhammar, with her song "Du är inte ensam", was chosen as the winner.

Lilla Melodifestivalen 2014
R/O	Artist	Song
1	Vilma Larsson	"Stilla"
2	Kevin Körber	"När hoppet tar slut"
3	Ella Rammelt	"Oslagbara"
4	Skyscraper	"Här är vi nu"
5	Paulina Pancenkov	"Jag saknar dig så"
6	Tove Burman	"Rebell"
7	Felix Laurent	"Jag trodde på oss"
8	Julia Kedhammar	"Du är inte ensam"

== At Junior Eurovision ==
At the running order draw which took place on 9 November 2014, Sweden was drawn to perform seventh on 15 November 2014, following Georgia and preceding Ukraine.

=== Voting ===
Points awarded to Sweden
Score	Country
12 points (Note: All countries received one set of 12 points to ensure no country finished with nul points.)	
10 points	
8 points	
7 points	
6 points	
5 points	Netherlands
4 points	Italy
3 points	Ukraine
2 points	Cyprus
1 point	Armenia; Georgia

Points awarded by Sweden
Score	Country
12 points	Netherlands
10 points	Bulgaria
8 points	Armenia
7 points	Italy
6 points	Cyprus
5 points	Belarus
4 points	Malta
3 points	Serbia
2 points	Slovenia
1 point	Russia

==== Detailed voting results ====
The following members comprised the Swedish jury:

- Daniel Réhn
- Gustav Dahlander
- Mirja Bokholm
- Marie Olofsson
- Samuel Andersson

Detailed voting results from Sweden
Draw	Country	D. Réhn	G. Dahlander	M. Bokholm	M. Olofsson	S. Andersson	Average Jury Points	Televoting Points	Points Awarded
01	Belarus	2	7	7			2	7	5
02	Bulgaria	12		6	12		6	12	10
03	San Marino								
04	Croatia								
05	Cyprus	3	8	8	10	10	10		6
06	Georgia	6	5		2	2	1		
07	Sweden								
08	Ukraine	5	6	2	1	3	3	1	
09	Slovenia			1		1		6	2
10	Montenegro								
11	Italy	10	4	3	4	12	8	5	7
12	Armenia	7	2	10	6	8	7	8	8
13	Russia		3		5	5		4	1
14	Serbia	1	12	5	7	4	5	2	3
15	Malta	8	1	4	3	6	4	3	4
16	Netherlands	4	10	12	8	7	12	10	12
