= Croatia in the Junior Eurovision Song Contest 2014 =

- Junior Eurovision Song Contest 2014
- Participating broadcaster: Croatian Radiotelevision (HRT)
- Country: Croatia
- Selection process: Internal selection
- Announcement date: 2 October 2014

Competing entry
- Song: "Game Over"
- Artist: Josie Zec
- Songwriter: Josephine Zec

Placement
- Final result: 16th (last), 13 points

Participation chronology

Croatia was represented at the Junior Eurovision Song Contest 2014 with the song "Game Over", written and performed by Josephine Zec. The Croatian participating broadcaster, Hrvatska radiotelevizija (HRT) internally selected its entry for the contest. The entry and performer was revealed on 2 October 2014.

== Internal selection ==
Despite withdrawing from the Eurovision Song Contest 2014, on 26 September 2014 it was announced that Croatia would return to the Junior Eurovision Song Contest in 2014, after a seven-year absence. On 2 October 2014, Hrvatska radiotelevizija (HRT) announced that it had internally selected Josephine Zec with the song "Game Over". A presentation of the song took place on 3 October 2014 at 09:30 CET on the television show "Puni Kerg".

== At Junior Eurovision ==
At the running order draw which took place on 9 November 2014, Croatia were drawn to perform fourth on 15 November 2014, following San Marino and preceding Cyprus.

=== Voting ===
Points awarded to Croatia
Score	Country
12 points (Note: All countries received one set of 12 points to ensure no country finished with nul points.)	
10 points	
8 points	
7 points	
6 points	
5 points	
4 points	
3 points	
2 points	
1 point	San Marino

Points awarded by Croatia
Score	Country
12 points	Bulgaria
10 points	Italy
8 points	Serbia
7 points	Ukraine
6 points	Armenia
5 points	Russia
4 points	Netherlands
3 points	Slovenia
2 points	Belarus
1 point	Georgia

==== Detailed voting results ====
The following members comprised the Croatian jury:

- Duško Mandić
- Iva Šulentić
- Nensi Atanasov
- Ivan Horvat
- Jacques Houdek

Detailed voting results from Croatia
Draw	Country	D. Mandić	I. Šulentić	N. Atanasov	I. Horvat	J. Houdek	Average Jury Points	Televoting Points	Points Awarded
01	Belarus	7	5	4	4	6	5		2
02	Bulgaria	8	7	7	6	7	8	10	12
03	San Marino								
04	Croatia								
05	Cyprus	5	6	2	3	5	4		
06	Georgia	6	2		1		1	3	1
07	Sweden		1	3	2	4	3		
08	Ukraine							12	7
09	Slovenia		3	5		1		7	3
10	Montenegro							1	
11	Italy	12	12	12	10	12	12	4	10
12	Armenia	2	4	8	8	8	7	5	6
13	Russia	10	10	10	12	10	10	2	5
14	Serbia	3	8	6	7	3	6	8	8
15	Malta	4							
16	Netherlands	1		1	5	2	2	6	4
