= Belarus in the Junior Eurovision Song Contest 2014 =

- Junior Eurovision Song Contest 2014
- Country: Belarus
- Selection process: National Final; 50% Jury; 50% Televoting
- Selection date: 29 August 2014

Competing entry
- Song: "Sokal"
- Artist: Nadezhda Misyakova

Placement
- Final result: 7th, 71 points

Participation chronology

Belarus was represented at the Junior Eurovision Song Contest 2014 in Marsa, Malta. The Belarusian entry was selected through a national final, organised by Belarusian broadcaster Belarusian Television and Radio Company (BTRC). The final was held on 29 August 2014. Nadezhda Misyakova and her song "Sokol" won the national final, scoring 15 points.

== Before Junior Eurovision ==
=== National final ===
On 6 March 2014, BTRC announced that a national final would be held to select Belarus' entry for the Junior Eurovision Song Contest 2014. A submission period for interested artists was opened and lasted until 9 June 2014. After the deadline passed, 48 applications were received by the broadcaster. A professional jury selected ten artists and songs from the applicants to proceed to the televised national final, which were announced on 17 June 2014.

==== Final ====
The final took place on 29 August 2014 at the studio 600 in Minsk, hosted by Teo, Belarus' 2014 Eurovision contestant, and Ilya Volkov, Belarus' 2013 Junior Eurovision contestant.

The equal combination of votes from a professional jury and the votes from the public resulted in a tie between "Sokal" performed by Nadezhda Misyakova, "Mamina lyubov" performed by Ksenia & Pavel Lashchevsky and "Geta moy lios" performed by Anna Zaitseva. The tie was resolved by the jury with "Sokal" by Nadezhda Misyakova being announced as the winner of the competition and was thus selected as Belarus' entry in Marsa. The members of the jury were Gennadiy Markevich, Tatyana Parhamovich, Irina Dorofeeva, Lyudmila Borodina, Nadezhda Vasilchenko, Olga Vorobyeva, Tatyana Yakusheva, Elena Treschinskaya and Eduard Zartisky.

In addition to the performances from the competitors, the show featured guest performances by Olga Shamrova' ballet, Olga Satsiuk, Egor Volchek and Lidiya Zablotskaya.

Final – 29 August 2014
Draw	Artist	Song	Language	Jury	Televote		Total	Place
1	Yulia Levina	"Zhuravy"	Belarusian	3	1,815	6	9	8
2	Anna Ermakovich	"Mama, eto ya!"	Russian	2	1,376	5	7	9
3	Nadezhda Misyakova	"Sokal"	Belarusian	12	1,068	3	15	1
4	Vladislava Doroshevich	"Ya veryu v svoyu mechtu!"	Russian	1	5,345	12	13	6
5	Elena Titova	"Stsena"	Russian, English	10	1,260	4	14	4
6	Daria Atroshenko	"Spoyot solntse"	Russian	4	370	1	5	10
7	Angelina Pipper	"Vyshe vsekh"	Russian	6	3,580	8	14	5
8	Ksenia & Pavel Lashchevsky	"Mamina lyubov"	Russian	5	3,682	10	15	3
9	Antoniy Konoplyanik	"Mister perviy"	Russian	7	544	2	9	7
10	Anna Zaitseva	"Geta moy lios"	Belarusian, English	8	3,430	7	15	2

== At Junior Eurovision ==
At the running order draw which took place on 9 November 2014, Belarus were drawn to open the show on 15 November 2014, preceding Bulgaria.

=== Voting ===
Points awarded to Belarus
Score	Country
12 points (Note: All countries received one set of 12 points to ensure no country finished with nul points.)	
10 points	
8 points	Kids Jury; Russia
7 points	Netherlands
6 points	Georgia; Malta; Ukraine
5 points	Sweden
4 points	
3 points	Armenia; San Marino
2 points	Croatia; Slovenia
1 point	Bulgaria; Cyprus; Italy

Points awarded by Belarus
Score	Country
12 points	Armenia
10 points	Russia
8 points	Malta
7 points	Bulgaria
6 points	Ukraine
5 points	Netherlands
4 points	Georgia
3 points	Cyprus
2 points	Italy
1 point	Slovenia

==== Detailed voting results ====
The following members comprised the Belarusian jury:

- Tatsyana Yakusheva
- Elena Atrashkevich
- Yuriy Vashchuk (Teo)
- Gennady Markevich
- Olga Ryzhikova

Detailed voting results from Belarus
Draw	Country	T. Yakusheva	E. Atrashkevich	Y. Vashchuk	G. Markevich	O. Ryzhikova	Average Jury Points	Televoting Points	Points Awarded
01	Belarus								
02	Bulgaria	4	10	4	7	3	6	7	7
03	San Marino		1	1	3	2			
04	Croatia								
05	Cyprus	8	6	8	6	8	7	1	3
06	Georgia	7	5	5	1	5	5	3	4
07	Sweden					4			
08	Ukraine	1		3	4		2	8	6
09	Slovenia	2	2			1		4	1
10	Montenegro								
11	Italy	3	4	6	2	6	4	2	2
12	Armenia	12	7	12	12	12	12	10	12
13	Russia	6	12	7	5	7	8	12	10
14	Serbia	5	3				1		
15	Malta	10	8	10	8	10	10	6	8
16	Netherlands			2	10		3	5	5
