= Malta in the Junior Eurovision Song Contest 2014 =

- Junior Eurovision Song Contest 2014
- Country: Malta
- Selection process: Internal selection
- Announcement date: Artist: 20 April 2014; Song: 12 September 2014

Competing entry
- Song: "Diamonds"
- Artist: Federica Falzon

Placement
- Final result: 4th, 116 points

Participation chronology

Malta selected their Junior Eurovision Song Contest 2014 entry through an internal selection like they did the previous year. On 20 April 2014 it was revealed that Federica Falzon would represent Malta in the contest. It was announced on 12 September 2014 that her song would be called "Diamonds".

== Internal selection ==
After winning the Junior Eurovision Song Contest 2013 with the internally selected Gaia Cauchi, the Maltese broadcaster PBS decided to internally select their 2014 artist as well. On 20 April 2014, PBS revealed that 11-year-old Federica Falzon would represent Malta. Falzon is a student of Gillian Attard, who also was the vocal coach of Cauchi. On 22 August 2014, it was revealed that her song was written by Attard, Elton Zarb, and Matt Muxu Mercieca who were all members of the writing team that wrote the winning song "The Start". The title of the song was revealed to be "Diamonds" on 12 September 2014.

== At Junior Eurovision ==
At the running order draw which took place on 9 November 2014, host country Malta were drawn to perform fifteenth on 15 November 2014, following Serbia and preceding Netherlands.

=== Voting ===
Points awarded to Malta
Score	Country
12 points (Note: All countries received one set of 12 points to ensure no country finished with nul points.)	Italy
10 points	Kids Jury; Russia; San Marino
8 points	Belarus
7 points	Cyprus; Serbia; Ukraine
6 points	Armenia; Montenegro; Slovenia
5 points	Bulgaria; Georgia
4 points	Sweden
3 points	
2 points	
1 point	Netherlands

Points awarded by Malta
Score	Country
12 points	Armenia
10 points	Italy
8 points	Bulgaria
7 points	Georgia
6 points	Belarus
5 points	Montenegro
4 points	Ukraine
3 points	Russia
2 points	Netherlands
1 point	San Marino

==== Detailed voting results ====
The following members comprised the Maltese jury:

- Jolene Micallef
- Paul Abela
- Chrysander Agius
- Amber Bondin
- Corazon Mizzi

Detailed voting results from Malta
Draw	Country	J. Micallef	P. Abela	C. Agius	A. Bondin	C. Mizzi	Average Jury Points	Televoting Points	Points Awarded
01	Belarus	8	3	12	4	10	8	2	6
02	Bulgaria	3	7		7		3	12	8
03	San Marino	4		10	5	12	7		1
04	Croatia				1				
05	Cyprus	6	1	1	8		2	3	
06	Georgia		10	5	6	8	5	6	7
07	Sweden			6					
08	Ukraine			2		3		8	4
09	Slovenia		5		3		1	1	
10	Montenegro	12	4	7	10	6	10		5
11	Italy	5	8	8	2	7	6	10	10
12	Armenia	10	12	4	12	4	12	5	12
13	Russia	7	6			5	4	4	3
14	Serbia	2	2			1			
15	Malta								
16	Netherlands	1		3		2		7	2
