= Italy in the Junior Eurovision Song Contest 2014 =

- Junior Eurovision Song Contest 2014
- Participating broadcaster: Radiotelevisione italiana (RAI)
- Country: Italy
- Selection process: Internal selection
- Announcement date: Artist: 4 September 2014; Song: 3 October 2014

Competing entry
- Song: "Tu primo grande amore"
- Artist: Vincenzo Cantiello
- Songwriters: Fabrizio Berlincioni; Vincenzo Cantiello; Leonardo de Amicis; Francesca Giuliano; Alterisio Paoletti

Placement
- Final result: 1st, 159 points

Participation chronology

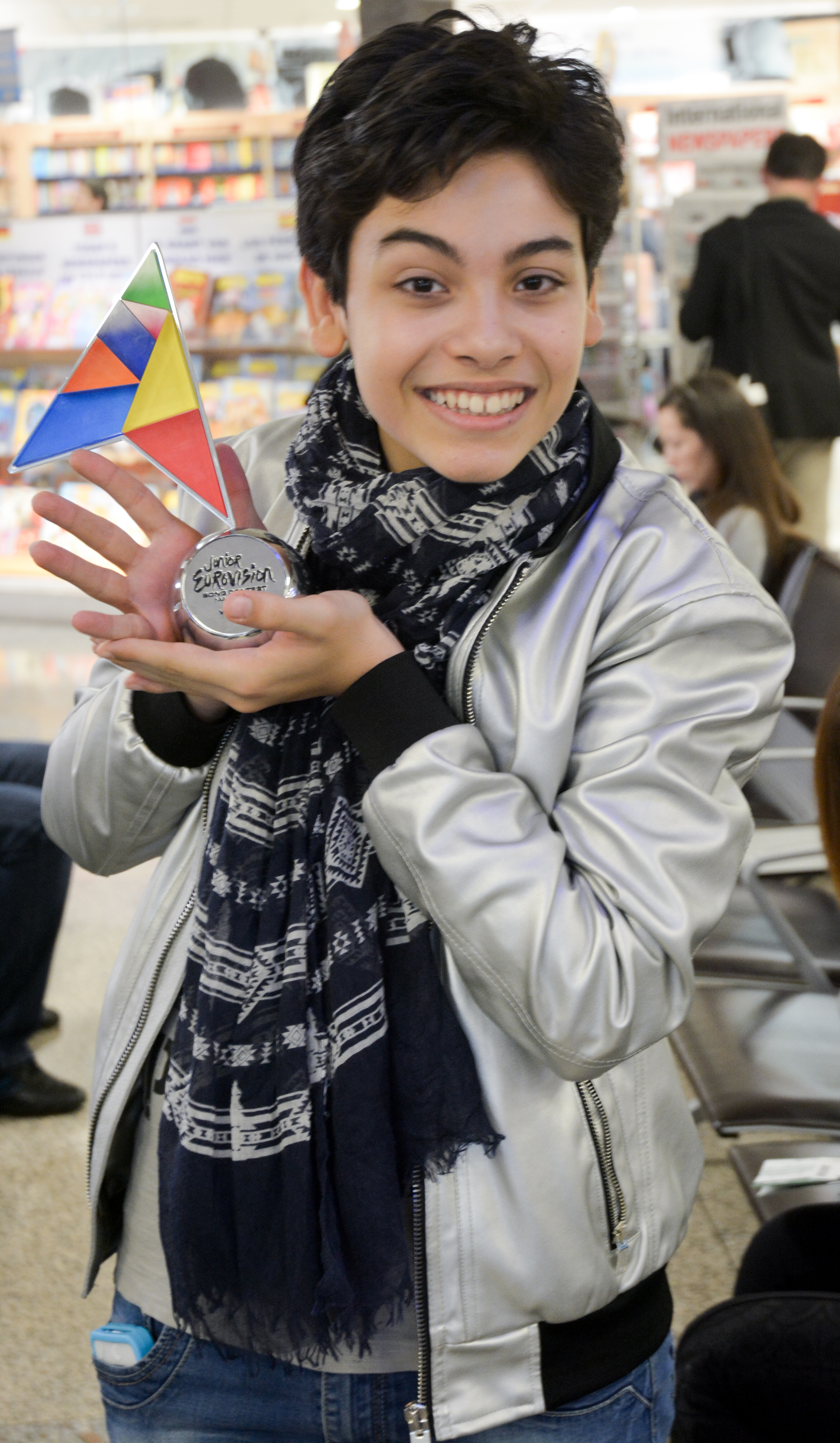
Vincenzo Cantiello with his trophy

Italy was represented at the Junior Eurovision Song Contest 2014 with the song "Tu primo grande amore", written by Fabrizio Berlincioni, Vincenzo Cantiello, Leonardo de Amicis, Francesca Giuliano, and Alterisio Paoletti, and performed by Cantiello himself. The Italian participating broadcaster, Radiotelevisione italiana (RAI), internally selected its entry for the contest. This was the first-ever entry from Italy in the Junior Eurovision Song Contest. The song won the contest with 159 points.

== Internal selection ==
Shortly after the Junior Eurovision Song Contest 2013, Radiotelevisione italiana (RAI) revealed that it was interested in participating in the 2014 contest and attended a workshop for interested broadcasters. On 8 July 2014, it was announced that Italy would in fact make their debut in the 2014 contest. Two months later on 4 September 2014, the broadcaster revealed that Vincenzo Cantiello had been internally selected to represent the country with the song "Tu primo grande amore".

== At Junior Eurovision ==
At the running order draw which took place on 9 November 2014, Italy were drawn to perform eleventh on 15 November 2014, following Montenegro and preceding Armenia.

=== Voting ===
Points awarded to Italy
Score	Country
12 points (Note: All countries received one set of 12 points to ensure no country finished with nul points.)	Kids Jury; Montenegro; San Marino; Slovenia
10 points	Bulgaria; Croatia; Cyprus; Georgia; Malta; Ukraine
8 points	Armenia; Netherlands; Serbia
7 points	Sweden
6 points	Russia
5 points	
4 points	
3 points	
2 points	Belarus
1 point	

Points awarded by Italy
Score	Country
12 points	Malta
10 points	Bulgaria
8 points	San Marino
7 points	Netherlands
6 points	Serbia
5 points	Cyprus
4 points	Sweden
3 points	Ukraine
2 points	Armenia
1 point	Belarus

==== Detailed voting results ====
The following members comprised the Italian jury:

- Dario Salvatori
- Barbara Mosconi
- Mariolina Simone
- Massimiliano Pani
- Davide Maggio

Detailed voting results from Italy
Draw	Country	D. Salvatori	B. Mosconi	M. Simone	M. Pani	D. Maggio	Average Jury Points	Televoting Points	Points Awarded
01	Belarus	6	1	7			1	6	1
02	Bulgaria	10			2			12	10
03	San Marino	3	6		1	10	2	10	8
04	Croatia								
05	Cyprus		12	12	3		8	3	5
06	Georgia				12	1			
07	Sweden	8	5	8	5	3	10		4
08	Ukraine	2		1	7			8	3
09	Slovenia	5	8	4	4	4	5	1	
10	Montenegro		3			2			
11	Italy								
12	Armenia	4	4	10		7	4	4	2
13	Russia	7		2	8	6	3	2	
14	Serbia		10	5	6	12	12		6
15	Malta	1	2	6	10	8	6	7	12
16	Netherlands	12	7	3		5	7	5	7
