= Bulgaria in the Junior Eurovision Song Contest 2014 =

- Junior Eurovision Song Contest 2014
- Country: Bulgaria
- Selection process: Internal selection
- Announcement date: Artist: 26 July 2014; Song: 9 October 2014

Competing entry
- Song: "Planet of the Children"
- Artist: Krisia, Hasan and Ibrahim
- Songwriters: Slavi Trifonov; Krisia Todorova; Evgueny Dimitrov; Ivaylo Valchev

Placement
- Final result: 2nd, 147 points

Participation chronology

Bulgaria selected their Junior Eurovision Song Contest 2014 entry through an internal selection. On 26 July 2014 the Bulgarian broadcaster BNT stated that they will return to the contest with Krisia Todorova. This was later confirmed by the EBU on 1 August 2014. Krisia Todorova, Hasan and Ibrahim Ignatov represented Bulgaria with the song Planet of the Children. Despite being one of the favourites to win the contest, it finished second with 147 points.

== Internal selection ==
On 25 July 2014 the Novini.bg stated that Bulgaria would return to the contest with Krisia Todorova singing and Hasan and Ibrahim playing the piano. Despite originally being considered speculation, the next day the Bulgarian broadcaster revealed that Todorova would actually represent Bulgaria in the 2014 contest. The EBU confirmed this news a week later. On 9 October, Todorova presented her Junior Eurovision entry Planet of the Children live on Slavi's Show on bTV.

== At Junior Eurovision ==
At the running order draw which took place on 9 November 2014, Bulgaria were drawn to perform second on 15 November 2014, following Belarus and preceding San Marino.

=== Final ===
Krisia Todorova stood in the centre of the stage, where she performed her song. She was wearing a beautiful full length black and white dress, with a red bow on the back. Ibrahim was in a white suit, and played the white piano, while Hasan was wearing a black suit, and played the black piano. The backdrop was blue, with clouds, winter trees, and bright green flowers. During the chorus, the backdrop transformed into lovely mountains, with a white snowy road that leads to a huge castle covered in snow, just like in a fairytale.

=== Voting ===
The voting during the final consisted of 50 percent public televoting and 50 percent from a jury deliberation. The jury consisted of five music industry professionals who were citizens of the country they represent, with their names published before the contest to ensure transparency. This jury was asked to judge each contestant based on: vocal capacity; the stage performance; the song's composition and originality; and the overall impression by the act. In addition, no member of a national jury could be related in any way to any of the competing acts in such a way that they cannot vote impartially and independently. The individual rankings of each jury member were released one month after the final.

Following the release of the full split voting by the EBU after the conclusion of the competition, it was revealed that Bulgaria had placed first with the public televote and fourth with the jury vote. In the public vote, Bulgaria scored 143 points, while with the jury vote, Bulgaria scored 86 points.

Below is a breakdown of points awarded to Bulgaria and awarded by Bulgaria in the final and the breakdown of the jury voting and televoting conducted during the final.

Points awarded to Bulgaria
Score	Country
12 points (Note: All countries received one set of 12 points to ensure no country finished with nul points.)	Croatia; Cyprus; Netherlands; Serbia
10 points	Italy; Slovenia; Sweden
8 points	Georgia; Malta; Montenegro; Ukraine
7 points	Armenia; Belarus; Russia
6 points	
5 points	
4 points	Kids Jury
3 points	
2 points	
1 point	

Points awarded by Bulgaria
Score	Country
12 points	Armenia
10 points	Italy
8 points	Cyprus
7 points	Russia
6 points	Serbia
5 points	Malta
4 points	Ukraine
3 points	Netherlands
2 points	Georgia
1 point	Belarus

==== Detailed voting results ====
The following members comprised the Bulgarian jury:

- Daniela Stankova
- Haigashot Agasyan
- Dorotea Petrova
- Snezhana Polihronova
- Rossalin Nakov

Detailed voting results from Bulgaria
Draw	Country	D. Stankova	H. Agasyan	D. Petrova	S. Polihronova	R. Nakov	Average Jury Points	Televoting Points	Points Awarded
01	Belarus	4	1	1			1	4	1
02	Bulgaria								
03	San Marino								
04	Croatia			4					
05	Cyprus	6	7	8	5	7	7	7	8
06	Georgia			2	1	1		5	2
07	Sweden	1	3		3	4	2		
08	Ukraine				2	2		6	4
09	Slovenia	2	6	6	6	6	5		
10	Montenegro								
11	Italy	8	8	10	12	12	10	8	10
12	Armenia	12	10	5	8	5	8	12	12
13	Russia	3	2	7		3	3	10	7
14	Serbia	7	12	12	10	10	12	1	6
15	Malta	5	4	3	7	8	6	3	5
16	Netherlands	10	5		4		4	2	3
