= Slovenia in the Junior Eurovision Song Contest 2014 =

- Junior Eurovision Song Contest 2014
- Country: Slovenia
- Selection process: Internal selection
- Announcement date: Artist: 16 September 2014; Song: 5 October 2014

Competing entry
- Song: "Nisi sam (Your Light)"
- Artist: Ula Ložar

Placement
- Final result: 12th, 29 points

Participation chronology

Slovenia selected their first Junior Eurovision Song Contest 2014 entry through an internal selection. On 16 September 2014 it was revealed that Ula Ložar would represent Slovenia after having open auditions.

== Before Junior Eurovision ==
=== Internal selection ===
After much speculation, on 19 August 2014 Vladislav Yakovlev revealed on his Twitter account that Slovenia would make their debut in the 2014 contest. The next day, the Slovene broadcaster RTVSLO announced that they would select their participant internally though the broadcaster's Children and Entertainment Departments. On 16 September 2014, the broadcaster revealed that 12-year-old Ula Ložar had been selected to represent the country in Marsa, Malta.

== At Junior Eurovision ==
At the running order draw which took place on 9 November 2014, Slovenia were drawn to perform ninth on 15 November 2014, following Ukraine and preceding Montenegro. Slovenia finished 12th in the final with 29 points, despite being one of the favourites to win the contest.

=== Voting ===
Points awarded to Slovenia
Score	Country
12 points (Note: All countries received one set of 12 points to ensure no country finished with nul points.)	
10 points	
8 points	
7 points	
6 points	
5 points	
4 points	Netherlands
3 points	Croatia; Montenegro
2 points	Armenia; Serbia; Sweden
1 point	Belarus

Points awarded by Slovenia
Score	Country
12 points	Italy
10 points	Bulgaria
8 points	Armenia
7 points	Russia
6 points	Malta
5 points	Serbia
4 points	Cyprus
3 points	Montenegro
2 points	Belarus
1 point	Ukraine

==== Detailed voting results ====
The Slovenian votes in this final were based on 100% jury. The following members comprised the Slovene jury:

- Irena Vrčkovnik
- Urša Vlašič
- Anže Langus Petrović
- Eva Černe
- Alex Volasko

Detailed voting results from Slovenia
Draw	Country	I. Vrčkovnik	U. Vlašič	A. Langus Petrović	E. Černe	A. Volasko	Points Awarded
01	Belarus	1	2	2	2	4	2
02	Bulgaria	10	8	10	8	12	10
03	San Marino						
04	Croatia						
05	Cyprus	6	1	7		2	4
06	Georgia	4			6		
07	Sweden		6		4		
08	Ukraine		4	3	3	1	1
09	Slovenia						
10	Montenegro	2		5		5	3
11	Italy	12	12	12	12	10	12
12	Armenia	8	10	8	7	8	8
13	Russia	7	7	6	5	7	7
14	Serbia	5	3	4		6	5
15	Malta	3	5	1	10	3	6
16	Netherlands				1		
