= Vincenzo Cantiello =

Italian singer (born 2000)

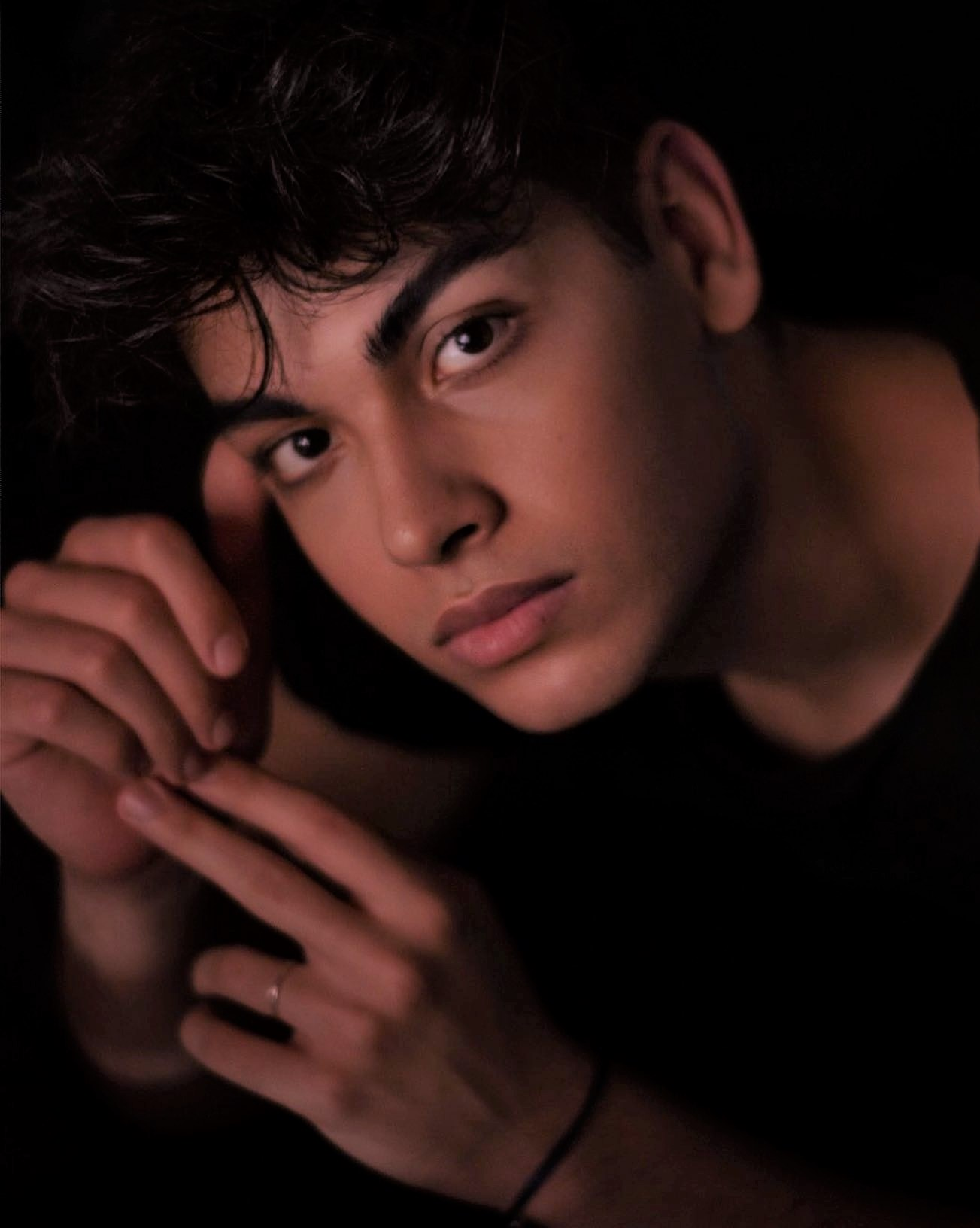
- Vincenzo Cantiello in 2021

Background information
- Born: 25 August 2000 (age 25); Sant'Arpino, Italy
- Genres: Pop, soul
- Occupation: Singer
- Instrument: Vocals
- Years active: 2009–present

Vincenzo Cantiello (born 25 August 2000) is an Italian singer who represented Italy at the Junior Eurovision Song Contest 2014 with the song "Tu primo grande amore" and won.

== Early life ==
Cantiello was born on 25 August 2000 in Sant'Arpino, Campania. He has been interested in music since early childhood initially singing in the choir of his church, but had started singing on his own when he was 9.

== Career ==
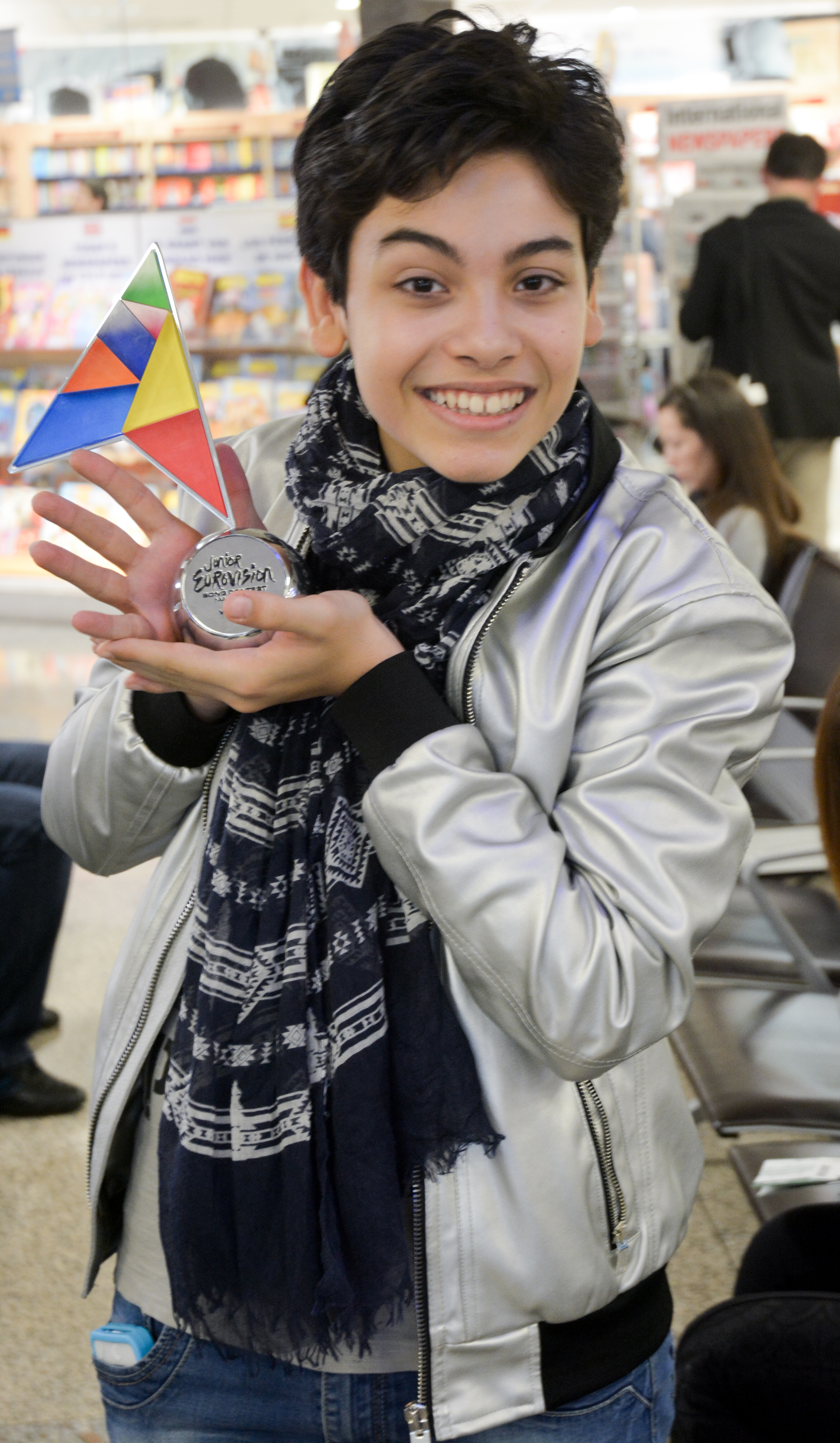
Vincenzo Cantiello after winning the Junior Eurovision Song Contest 2014

He gained national attention after taking part in Ti lascio una canzone in 2014. Later that year, he represented Italy at the Junior Eurovision Song Contest 2014 in Marsa, Malta, with his song "Tu primo grande amore", winning the contest with a total of 159 points, just twelve points ahead from Bulgaria's Planet of the Children who placed second. He was Italy's first ever entrant at the competition and also the only male solo singer in the entire competition. He then made an appearance in the subsequent contest. He performed his winning song, read out the Italian votes and handed the trophy to the winner. In 2022, for the occasion of the 20th edition of the event, Cantiello performed as part of the winners interval act, and again read out the Italian points.

== Discography ==
=== Singles ===
Year	Title	Album
2013	"Glitter & Gold"	Non-album singles
2014	"Tu primo grande amore"	Non-album singles
2015	"All of Me"	Non-album singles
2015	"Take Me to Church"	Non-album singles
2016	"Summer Thrills"	Never Too Much
2019	"Cosa diventerai"	Non-album singles
2021	"Tempesta"	Non-album singles

=== Albums ===
Year	Title
2016	Never Too Much

Awards and achievements
Preceded by None	Italy in the Junior Eurovision Song Contest; 2014	Succeeded by Chiara & Martina Scarpari with "Viva"
Preceded by (Malta) Gaia Cauchi with "The Start"	Winner of the Junior Eurovision Song Contest; 2014	Succeeded by (Malta) Destiny Chukunyere with "Not My Soul"
