= Junior Eurovision Song Contest 2014 =

International song competition for youth

- #Together

Date and venue
- Final: 15 November 2014
- Venue: Malta Shipbuilding; Marsa, Malta

Organisation
- Organiser: European Broadcasting Union (EBU)
- Executive supervisor: Vladislav Yakovlev

Production
- Host broadcaster: Public Broadcasting Services (PBS)
- Director: Gordon Bonello
- Executive producer: Anton Attard
- Presenter: Moira Delia

Participants
- Number of entries: 16
- Debuting countries: Italy; Montenegro; Slovenia
- Returning countries: Bulgaria; Croatia; Cyprus; Serbia
- Non-returning countries: Azerbaijan; Macedonia; Moldova
- Participation map: Competing countries Countries that participated in the past but not in 2014

Vote
- Voting system: Each country awards 12, 10, 8–1 points to their 10 favourite songs.
- Winning song: Italy "Tu primo grande amore"

The Junior Eurovision Song Contest 2014 was the 12th edition of the Junior Eurovision Song Contest, held on 15 November 2014 at the Malta Shipbuilding in Marsa, Malta, and presented by Moira Delia. It was organised by the European Broadcasting Union (EBU) and host broadcaster Public Broadcasting Services (PBS). This was the third time that the contest was hosted by the previous year's winning broadcaster. It was the first time in Junior Eurovision history that there was only one presenter of the show.

Broadcasters from a total of sixteen countries participated in the contest, with Italy, Montenegro and Slovenia making their debuts.

The winner was Italy with the song "Tu primo grande amore" by Vincenzo Cantiello. Bulgaria and Armenia finished in second and third place, respectively. This was Italy's first victory in a Eurovision event since the last edition of Jeux Sans Frontières in 1999, and also marked the first time since the inaugural 2003 contest that a country had won in its débutante year.

== Location ==
The venue for the contest was Malta Shipbuilding in Marsa

By September 2013, Maltese broadcaster Public Broadcasting Services (PBS) had submitted a bid to host the 2014 contest in Malta and was seen as the frontrunner to stage the event. Upon Malta's victory in the 2013 contest, the EBU immediately began assessing the suitability of their bid and selected it outside of regular procedures, with an official agreement signed on 17 December 2013 and Malta announced as the host country the following day, 18 December.

Vladislav Yakovlev, the executive supervisor for the Junior Eurovision Song Contest, announced that there would be no host city for the contest, but that the island of Malta would be a "host island" instead. This was the first time Malta had hosted any of the Eurovision-related events.

On 16 June 2014, the EBU confirmed that the 2014 contest would be held at three large former shipbuilding sheds of Malta Shipbuilding. The middle shed would be the main audience area and stage, while the two side sheds would be used as audience entrances and exits, restrooms, and refreshment stalls. In total, there was capacity for 4,000–4,500 people inside the buildings.

== Participants ==
Cover art of the official album

On 30 September 2014, it was confirmed that sixteen countries would be taking part in the contest. This was the highest number of entries since 2007. Débutante countries included, Italy, Montenegro, and Slovenia. Four countries returned to the contest, including Croatia after a seven-year absence, Cyprus who last took part in 2009, Serbia and Bulgaria after a three and two year absences respectively.

Prior to the event, a digital compilation album featuring all the songs from the 2014 contest, along with karaoke versions, was put together by the European Broadcasting Union and released by Universal Music Group on 3 November 2014.

Participants of the Junior Eurovision Song Contest 2014
Country	Broadcaster	Artist	Song	Language	Songwriter(s)
Armenia	AMPTV	Betty	"People of the Sun"	Armenian, English	Avet Barseghyan; Betty; Mane Hakobyan
Belarus	BTRC	Nadezhda Misyakova	"Sokal" (Сокал)	Belarusian	Nadezhda Misyakova; Uzari
Bulgaria	BNT	Krisia, Hasan and Ibrahim	"Planet of the Children"	Bulgarian	Evgueny Dimitrov; Krisia Todorova; Slavi Trifonov; Ivailo Valchev
Croatia	HRT	Josie	"Game Over"	Croatian, English	Josephine Ida Zec
Cyprus	CyBC	Sophia Patsalides	"I pio omorfi mera" (Η πιο όμορφη μέρα)	Greek, English	Alex Panayi; Sophia Patsalides; Stavros Stavrou
Georgia	GPB	Lizi Pop	"Happy Day"	Georgian, English	Giorgi Kukhianidze
Italy	RAI	Vincenzo Cantiello	"Tu primo grande amore"	Italian, English	Fabrizio Berlincioni; Vincenzo Cantiello; Leonardo de Amicis; Francesca Giuliano; Alterisio Paoletti
Malta	PBS	Federica Falzon	"Diamonds"	English	Gillian Attard; Federica Falzon; Matt "Muxu" Mercieca; Elton Zarb
Montenegro	RTCG	Maša Vujadinović and Lejla Vulić	"Budi dijete na jedan dan" (Буди дијете на један дан)	Montenegrin, English	Slaven Knezović; Sanja Perić; Lejla Vulić
Netherlands	AVROTROS	Julia	"Around"	Dutch, English	Robert Dorn; Joost Griffioen; Julia van Bergen
Russia	VGTRK	Alisa Kozhikina	"Dreamer"	Russian, English	Maxim Fadeev; Alisa Kozhikina; Olga Seryabkina
San Marino	SMRTV	The Peppermints	"Breaking My Heart"	Italian, English	Antonello Carozza; Chris Lapolla; Luca Medri; The Peppermints
Serbia	RTS	Emilija Đonin	"Svet u mojim očima" (Свет у мојим очима)	Serbian	Nikola Čuturilo; Emilija Đonin; Dragan Ilić
Slovenia	RTVSLO	Ula Ložar	"Nisi sam (Your Light)"	Slovene, English	Lucienne Lonchina; Ula Ložar; Erika Mager; Raay; Marjetka Vovk
Sweden	SVT	Julia Kedhammar	"Du är inte ensam"	Swedish, English	Thomas G:son; Julia Kedhammar
Ukraine	NTU	Sympho-Nick	"Spring Will Come"	Ukrainian, English	Sofiia Kutsenko; Ameliya Kryms'ka; Yevgeny Matyushenko; Mikhail Nekrasov; Marta Rak

== Format ==
=== Graphic design ===
On 9 May 2014, Anton Attard, CEO of the host broadcaster, revealed the Junior Eurovision Song Contest 2014 logo and slogan. The slogan was "#together", while the logo was inspired by the Maltese cross. Each of its coloured segments represented a feature of Malta: Sand, Sea, Stone, Grass, Sky, Dusk and Sunset. The postcards included a theme of "extreme sports", and were partially filmed at the SmartCity Malta complex.

The stage design was presented during the Heads of Delegations meeting held on 30 September 2014. Gio'Forma, a Milan-based design company, was given the task of designing the stage for the 2014 contest. The stage used an origami-like appearance, inspired by the triangle-shaped 2014 Junior Eurovision logo. The venue itself was approximately 30,000 m^{2} (320,000 sq ft) in size, and the production team moved into the venue on 21 October.

=== Host ===
On 10 September 2014, it was announced that Moira Delia would host the 2014 contest. She is known in Malta for presenting editions of Malta Eurovision Song Contest, Malta's national selection for the Eurovision Song Contest. She was the first presenter to host the contest single-handedly.

=== Running order ===
During the Heads of Delegations meeting in Malta on 30 September 2014, the broadcaster PBS along with the production team sought permission to change the running order rule, which was to allow the artists to randomly select their position number (a system used in 2013). The agreed change was for the host country, Malta, to pick their position at random, followed by countries that were to open and close the show to be picked randomly. The remaining countries would then select at random whether they were to perform in the first or second half of the show. This draw took place during the opening ceremony, at the Verdala Palace on 9 November 2014. A pre-draw to decide the order in which countries would select their running order halves, took place on 7 November 2014, hosted by Moira Delia, Vladislav Yakovlev, and Gaia Cauchi. PBS and the production team then decided the running order so that they could avoid similar entries performing consecutively. This method has been used in the senior contests since 2013. The Executive Supervisor along with the Steering Group presented the finalised running order shortly after the opening ceremony.

=== Rehearsals ===
The national broadcaster, PBS, decided at the Heads of Delegations meeting on 30 September 2014, that all participating countries would not have their rehearsals in running order; allowing for school visits and personal trips of the participants to be carried out uninterruptedly, something which had not been done in previous years.

=== Voting ===
The voting system for 2014 was reverted to a system previously used in both the Junior and Senior contests prior to 2013. Both the national juries and televoting awarded 1 to 8 points, 10 and then the maximum 12 points to their ten favourite songs. The way the votes were to be announced remained unchanged, the first seven points appeared on screen; whilst spokespersons from each of the participating countries read out their top three points (8, 10, and 12).

On 30 October 2014, the EBU announced that a new online voting system would be introduced for the 2014 contest, to allow countries from around the world to vote for their favourite entry. The votes were not used in the official voting results, but the country who received the most online votes was presented with the new "Online Voting Winner" award, during the winners presentation conference after the show. In order to prevent vote-rigging, the online results were published via the Junior Eurovision website, after the show has concluded. Due to the website crashing the online voting award was not awarded.

== Contest overview ==
The event took place on 15 November 2014 at 19:00 CET. Sixteen countries participated, with the running order published on 9 October 2014. All the countries competing were eligible to vote with the jury and televote, as well as a Kids Jury, eligible to vote. Italy won with 159 points, with Bulgaria, Armenia, Malta, and Russia completing the top five. Slovenia, Sweden, Montenegro, San Marino, and Croatia occupied the bottom five positions.

The opening of the show featured a flash mob performance accompanied by the theme song "#Together" followed by the traditional flag parade accompanied by the theme song. The interval acts included a performance by last year's winner Gaia Cauchi and La Voix Academy featuring Andy Shaw and Veronica Rotin.

R/O	Country	Artist	Song	Points	Place
1	Belarus	Nadezhda Misyakova	"Sokal"	71	7
2	Bulgaria	Krisia, Hasan and Ibrahim	"Planet of the Children"	147	2
3	San Marino	The Peppermints	"Breaking My Heart"	21	15
4	Croatia	Josie	"Game Over"	13	16
5	Cyprus	Sophia Patsalides	"I pio omorfi mera"	69	9
6	Georgia	Lizi Pop	"Happy Day"	54	11
7	Sweden	Julia Kedhammar	"Du är inte ensam"	28	13
8	Ukraine	Sympho-Nick	"Spring Will Come"	74	6
9	Slovenia	Ula Ložar	"Nisi sam (Your Light)"	29	12
10	Montenegro	Maša Vujadinović and Lejla Vulić	"Budi dijete na jedan dan"	24	14
11	Italy	Vincenzo Cantiello	"Tu primo grande amore"	159	1
12	Armenia	Betty	"People of the Sun"	146	3
13	Russia	Alisa Kozhikina	"Dreamer"	96	5
14	Serbia	Emilija Đonin	"Svet u mojim očima"	61	10
15	Malta	Federica Falzon	"Diamonds"	116	4
16	Netherlands	Julia	"Around"	70	8

== Detailed voting results ==
Vincenzo Cantiello who represented Italy with the song "Tu primo grande amore", was declared the winner after all the votes had been cast from all of the sixteen participating countries and the kids jury. Below is a full breakdown of how the votes were cast.

Winner

Split results
Place	Combined		Jury		Televoting (Note: Including the juries of Slovenia and San Marino.)	
Place	Country	Points	Country	Points	Country	Points
1	Italy	159	Italy	143	Bulgaria	143
2	Bulgaria	147	Armenia	124	Armenia	114
3	Armenia	146	Malta	113	Ukraine	100
4	Malta	116	Bulgaria	86	Italy	100
5	Russia	96	Cyprus	73	Russia	89
6	Ukraine	74	Russia	72	Netherlands	69
7	Belarus	71	Serbia	65	Malta	64
8	Netherlands	70	Belarus	62	Belarus	58
9	Cyprus	69	Netherlands	44	Cyprus	42
10	Serbia	61	Georgia	44	Georgia	41
11	Georgia	54	Sweden	39	Slovenia	39
12	Slovenia	29	Ukraine	24	Serbia	34
13	Sweden	28	Montenegro	21	San Marino	11
14	Montenegro	24	Slovenia	14	Montenegro	10
15	San Marino	21	San Marino	11	Sweden	3
16	Croatia	13	Croatia	3	Croatia	1

Detailed voting results
Voting procedure used: 50% jury and televote 100% jury vote		Total score	Kids Jury	Belarus	Bulgaria	San Marino	Croatia	Cyprus	Georgia	Sweden	Ukraine	Slovenia	Montenegro	Italy	Armenia	Russia	Serbia	Malta	Netherlands
Contestants	Belarus	71	8		1	3	2	1	6	5	6	2		1	3	8		6	7
Contestants	Bulgaria	147	4	7			12	12	8	10	8	10	8	10	7	7	12	8	12
Contestants	San Marino	21												8				1	
Contestants	Croatia	13				1													
Contestants	Cyprus	69	6	3	8	8			4	6		4	4	5		3			6
Contestants	Georgia	54	1	4	2	2	1	3			2				12	5	1	7	2
Contestants	Sweden	28						2	1		3			4	1				5
Contestants	Ukraine	74		6	4		7	4	7			1	10	3	4	4	5	4	3
Contestants	Slovenia	29		1			3			2			3		2		2		4
Contestants	Montenegro	24										3					4	5	
Contestants	Italy	159	12	2	10	12	10	10	10	7	10	12	12		8	6	8	10	8
Contestants	Armenia	146	7	12	12	7	6	6	12	8	12	8	2	2		12	6	12	10
Contestants	Russia	96	5	10	7	5	5	8	3	1	5	7	5		10		10	3	
Contestants	Serbia	61	3		6	6	8			3	4	5	7	6		1			
Contestants	Malta	116	10	8	5	10		7	5	4	7	6	6	12	6	10	7		1
Contestants	Netherlands	70	2	5	3	4	4	5	2	12	1		1	7	5	2	3	2	

=== 12 points ===
Below is a summary of all 12 points received. All countries were given 12 points at the start of voting to ensure that no country finished with nul points.

N.	Contestant	Nation(s) giving 12 points
6	Armenia	Belarus, Bulgaria, Georgia, Malta, Russia, Ukraine
4	Bulgaria	Croatia, Cyprus, Netherlands, Serbia
4	Italy	Kids Jury, Montenegro, San Marino, Slovenia
1	Georgia	Armenia
1	Malta	Italy
1	Netherlands	Sweden

=== Spokespersons ===
The order in which each country announces their votes was in the order of performance. Details of the running order were published by the EBU after the 'Welcome Reception' on 9 November 2014. The spokespersons are shown below alongside each participating country. Gaia Cauchi announced the points from the 'Kids Jury.'

1. Kids Jury – Gaia Cauchi
2. Belarus – Katerina Taperkina
3. Bulgaria – Ina Angelova
4. San Marino – Clara
5. Croatia – Sarah
6. Cyprus – Paris Nicolaou
7. Georgia – Mariam Khunjgurua
8. Sweden – Elias Elffors Elfström
9. Ukraine – Sofia Tarasova
10. Slovenia – Gal Fajon
11. Montenegro – Aleksandra
12. Italy – Geordie Schembri
13. Armenia – Monica Avanesyan
14. Russia – Maria Kareeva
15. Serbia – Tamara Vasović
16. Malta – Julian Pulis
17. Netherlands – Mylène and Rosanne

== Other countries ==
For a country to be eligible for potential participation in the Junior Eurovision Song Contest, it needs to be an active member of the European Broadcasting Union. It is unknown whether the EBU issue invitations of participation to all 56 active members like they do for the Eurovision Song Contest. Sixteen countries confirmed their participation in the 2014 contest. The following EBU active members announced their decisions as shown below.

=== Active EBU members ===
- Azerbaijan – On 30 September 2014, it was revealed by the official list of participating countries that Azerbaijan were not participating at the contest in Malta.
- Germany – The German broadcaster Norddeutscher Rundfunk (NDR) announced they would not début at the 2014 contest as they believed the contest would not be a success under the German television marketing standards. They did, however, observe the 2014 contest.
- Greece – It was previously reported by Esc+Plus that Greece were going to participate in the 2014 contest. However, on 7 July 2014, the Greek broadcaster New Hellenic Radio, Internet and Television (NERIT) confirmed to the same web site that they would not be participating.
- Hungary – Despite being heavily rumoured to be planning a début for the 2014 contest, on 9 July 2014, the Hungarian broadcaster MTVA announced they would not be taking part in the contest.
- Ireland – One of the Irish broadcasters, Raidió Teilifís Éireann (RTÉ), announced in December 2013 that they do not have any interest in participating in the Junior Eurovision Song Contest, despite attending a steering group meeting. Another Irish broadcaster, TG4, had shown interest in the contest but would require funding from the Broadcasting Authority of Ireland (BAI). However, the BAI rejected such funding requests from TG4 in May 2014, so the network stated that they would not be making their début in Malta. However, they would be working harder to ascertain such funding with high hopes to participate in the 2015 contest. TG4 managed to debut at the contest in 2015 for Ireland.
- Moldova – On 30 September 2014, it was revealed by the official list of participating countries that Moldova were not participating at the contest in Malta.
- Portugal – Despite initially confirming their participation in the contest on 28 July 2014, the Portuguese broadcaster, Rádio e Televisão de Portugal (RTP), announced on 4 September 2014 that Portugal would not return to the contest in 2014.
- Romania – Bianca Dinescu, a representative of the Romanian broadcaster Romanian Television (TVR), had stated in an interview that Romania were considering a return to the contest, after being absent since 2009. However, on 2 August 2014, it was confirmed that Romania were not returning in 2014, but TVR said that they have high hopes to return in 2015.
- Spain – During the Eurovision Song Contest 2014 in Copenhagen, the head of the Spanish delegation, Federico Llano said that Televisión Española (TVE) was not planning to participate in the 2014 contest. If Spain were to return in the future, open castings and auditions would be held across the country.

=== Non-active EBU Members ===
In August 2014, executive supervisor Yakolev said that he was investigating the possibility of allowing commercial networks, who are not members of the EBU, to field contestants.

- Spain – According to the Junior Eurovision official Twitter account, the European Broadcasting Union were negotiating with Spanish private TV channels to manage the return of Spain to the contest. On 28 September 2014, it was announced that a decision about allowing private TV channels to take part hasn't been taken in time for this edition.

== Broadcasts ==
Most countries sent commentators to Malta, while others commentated from their own country, in order to add insight to the participants and, where necessary, provision of voting information.

Broadcasters and commentators in participating countries
Country	Broadcaster(s)	Commentator(s)	Ref.
Armenia	Armenia 1	Avet Barseghyan	
Belarus	Belarus 1 and Belarus 24	Anatoliy Lipetskiy	
Bulgaria	BNT 1 and BNT HD	Georgy Kushvaliev and Elena Rosberg	
Croatia	HRT 2	Ivan Planinić and Aljoša Šerić	
Cyprus	CyBC 2 and CyBC HD	Kyriacos Pastides	
Georgia	GPB 1TV	Mero Chikashvili and Temo Kvirkvelia	
Italy	Rai Gulp	Simone Lijoi and Antonella Clerici	
Malta	TVM	Daniel Chircop	
Montenegro	TVCG 2, TVCG SAT	Dražen Bauković and Tamara Ivanković	
Netherlands	NPO 3	Jan Smit	
Russia	Karousel	Olga Shelest and Alexander Gurevich	
San Marino	SMRTV	Lia Fiorio and Gilberto Gattei	
Serbia	RTS 2, RTS Sat	Silvana Grujić	
Slovenia	TV SLO 1	Bernarda Žarn	
Sweden	SVT Barnkanalen	Edward af Sillén and Ylva Hällen	
Ukraine	Pershyi Natsionalnyi	Timur Miroshnychenko	

The following non-participating countries also sent commentators to Malta for radio and television broadcasts of the contest.

Broadcasters and commentators in non-participating countries
Country	Broadcaster(s)	Commentator(s)	Ref.
Argentina	Radio WU	Victor Barrera	
Australia	SBS2	Georgia McCarthy and Andre Nookadu	
Ireland	92.5 Phoenix FM	Ewan Spence	
New Zealand	World FM	Ewan Spence	
Singapore	247 Music Radio	Ewan Spence	
United Kingdom	103 The Eye, K107, Oystermouth Radio, Radio Six International and Shore Radio	Ewan Spence	
United States	KCGW (Williams Life Radio), WXDR (Delgado’s Dolphin Radio)	Ewan Spence	

== Other awards ==
=== Press vote ===
At the press center during the contest, members of the press were allowed to vote for their favourite acts. Below is the top five overall results, after all the votes had been cast.

Country	Song	Performer(s)	Result
Bulgaria	"Planet of the Children"	Krisia, Hasan and Ibrahim	300
Italy	"Tu primo grande amore"	Vincenzo Cantiello	229
Malta	"Diamonds"	Federica Falzon	221
Cyprus	"I pio omorfi mera"	Sophia Patsalides	205
Netherlands	"Around"	Julia	155
