= Slovenia in the Junior Eurovision Song Contest =

- Junior Eurovision Song Contest
- Participating broadcaster: Radiotelevizija Slovenija (RTVSLO)

Participation summary
- Appearances: 2
- First appearance: 2014
- Last appearance: 2015
- Highest placement: 3rd: 2015
- Participation history: 2014; 2015; 2016 – 2026
- For the most recent participation see Slovenia in the Junior Eurovision Song Contest 2015

Slovenia has been represented at the Junior Eurovision Song Contest since the twelfth edition in 2014. The Slovene participating broadcaster in the contest is Radiotelevizija Slovenija (RTVSLO). The broadcaster originally used an internal selection format for its participation at the 2014 contest. The first entry at the 2014 contest was "Nisi sam (Your Light)" by Ula Ložar, which finished in twelfth place out of sixteen participating entries, achieving a score of twenty-nine points. RTVSLO participated for a second time at the 2015 contest. This time, it organised a children's spin-off of their Eurovision national final EMA to select their entry. "Prva ljubezen" by Lina Kuduzović finished in third place overall, achieving Slovenia's highest placing in both the adult and junior Eurovision Song Contest.

RTVSLO withdrew from the contest in 2016, citing that the decision was made based on changes to the contest rules by the EBU, although not specifying which rule changes influenced their decision to withdraw from the competition. Despite originally expressing an interest to return to the 2022 contest, the plans did not flourish and it is yet to return to the event.

== History ==
=== Participation ===
On 27 July 2014, it was speculated that Radiotelevizija Slovenija (RTVSLO) was considering debuting in the Junior Eurovision Song Contest 2014, having never participated before since the inception of the contest in 2003. This was later confirmed, with RTVSLO officially announcing their debut at the 2014 contest in Marsa, Malta on 19 August 2014. On 16 September 2014, the broadcaster announced that they had internally selected Ula Ložar to represent the country, with her song "Nisi sam (Your Light)", presented to the public on 5 October 2014. Despite being a bookmaker's favourite, Slovenia finished in twelfth position out of sixteen with twenty-nine points.

On 30 June 2015, RTVSLO confirmed that Slovenia would participate for a second time at the Junior Eurovision Song Contest in Sofia, Bulgaria. It was later revealed by the broadcaster that they would organise a national final in order to select both their entrant and song for the 2015 contest. Mini EMA was a spin-off of RTVSLO's national final for the adult Eurovision Song Contest EMA. The selection featured six performers over two semi-finals, with the final taking place on 4 October 2015. Lina Kuduzović was selected to represent the nation with "Prva ljubezen". At the contest, she finished in an impressive third place with 112 points. Slovenia placed third in public televoting and fourth with the professional juries. As of 2026, this remains Slovenia's highest placing in both the adult and junior Eurovision Song Contests.

=== Withdrawal ===
Despite the high placing in 2015, on 24 May 2016, RTVSLO withdrew from the Junior Eurovision Song Contest. The broadcaster cited dissatisfaction with rule changes introduced by the EBU, though not specifying the exact rule. The broadcaster did still screen the 2016 contest on TV SLO 2, with an audience of just 28,000, 105,000 less than the 2015 broadcast.

RTVSLO did not return to the contest in 2017 and did not broadcast the event for the first time since 2013. The broadcaster also opted not to return to the contest in 2018. On 9 June 2019, RTVSLO confirmed that they would be skipping the contest again in 2019, stating that the cost of participation was too high for the time slot of the contest. Previously, during Slovenia's participation span, the contest was broadcast during prime time, but was moved to an earlier time slot by the European Broadcasting Union. The broadcaster went on to decline participation in both the 2020 contest in Warsaw, Poland and the 2021 contest in Paris, France.

On 25 May 2022, RTVSLO confirmed that they were aiming to return to the Junior Eurovision Song Contest 2022 in Yerevan, Armenia. Marusa Kobal, head of Slovenia's Eurovision delegation, stated that the broadcaster had renewed interest in participating and that they would announce their final decision about potential participation in Armenia in due course. However, on 29 May 2022, the broadcaster announced that they had ruled out a return to the 2022 contest, due to the show not being provided in the broadcaster's Program-Production plan for 2022. In September 2022, Vanjo Vardjan, editor-in-chief of entertainment program at RTVSLO, reaffirmed that Slovenia’s absence from the contest was due to the amount of participating nations and the time slot of the event, meaning that the broadcaster was not confident the contest can achieve high viewing share. On 9 December 2022, the steering group of the EBU revealed that they were engaging in discussions surrounding potentially reverting the Junior Eurovision Song Contest back to a prime-time broadcast slot in the future. With this being one of RTVSLO’s main reasons for withdrawing, a further possibility of a Slovene return in future editions remained positive. However, on 26 May 2023, RTVSLO confirmed that Slovenia would not return to the 2023 contest in Nice, France, yet again citing financial constraints given the scheduling of the contest on a Sunday afternoon. The broadcaster's press department reinforced this reasoning in its absence from the 2024 contest. On 11 June 2025, RTVSLO lengthened Slovenia's absence from the contest, confirming that it would not participate in 2025 or 2026.

On 27 October 2026, RTVSLO confirmed that it had no intention of returning to the 2027 contest.

== Participation overview ==
Table key
| 3 | Third place |

| Year | Artist | Song | Language | Place | Points |
|---|---|---|---|---|---|
| 2014 | Ula Ložar | "Nisi sam (Your Light)" | Slovene, English | 12 | 29 |
| 2015 | Lina Kuduzović | "Prva ljubezen" | Slovene, English (Note: Contains one phrase in Italian) | 3 | 112 |

== Commentators and spokespersons ==
The Slovene broadcaster, RTV SLO, sent their own commentator to each contest in order to provide commentary in Slovene. Spokespersons were also chosen by the national broadcaster in order to announce the awarding points from Slovenia. The table below lists the details of each commentator and spokesperson since 2014.

| Year | Television | | Spokesperson | Ref. |
| Year | Commentator | Channel | Spokesperson | Ref. |
|---|---|---|---|---|
| 2014 | Bernarda Žarn | TV SLO 1 | Gal Fajon | |
| 2015 | Andrej Hofer | TV SLO 1 | Nikola Petek | |
| 2016 | Andrej Hofer | TV SLO 2 | Did not participate | |
| 2017–2026 | No broadcast | | Did not participate | |

== See also ==
- Slovenia in the Eurovision Song Contest
