= Ula Ložar =

Slovenian singer (born 2002)

- Also known as: Ula
- Born: Ula Ložar; 24 January 2002 (age 24); Ljubljana, Slovenia
- Genre: Pop
- Occupation: Singer
- Instrument: Vocals
- Years active: 2009–present

Ula Ložar (born 24 January 2002), sometimes known as simply Ula, is a Slovenian singer. She represented Slovenia with the song "Nisi sam (Your Light)" in the Junior Eurovision Song Contest 2014 in Malta. She participated in EMA 2019 with the song, "Fridays" where she placed 3rd.

== Discography ==
=== Singles ===
Title	Year	Peak chart positions	Album
Title	Year	SLO	Album
"Nisi sam (Your Light)"	2014	—	Non-album singles
"White Christmas / Bel božič" (with Maraaya, BQL, Nika Zorjan, Manca Špik, Luka Basi and Klara Jazbec)	2017	28	Non-album singles
"Fridays"	2019	—	Non-album singles

== See also ==
- Slovenia in the Eurovision Song Contest 2019
- Junior Eurovision Song Contest 2014

Awards and achievements
Preceded by —	Slovenia in the Junior Eurovision Song Contest; 2014	Succeeded by Lina Kuduzović
