= Nadezhda Misyakova =

Belarusian singer (born 2000)

Nadezhda Misyakova Надзея Місякова
- Born: 1 June 2000 (age 26); Minsk, Belarus
- Genres: Pop, folk, worldbeat
- Occupation: Singer
- Instrument: Vocals
- Years active: 2013–present

Nadezhda Misyakova (Belarusian: Надзея Місякова, romanized: Nadzieja Misiakova; Russian: Надежда Мисякова, romanized: Nadezhda Misyakova; born 1 June 2000) is a Belarusian singer. She represented Belarus in the Junior Eurovision Song Contest 2014 with her song "Sokal".

== Personal life ==
Nadezhda Misyakova was born on 1 June 2000 in Minsk, Belarus.

== Career ==
Nadezhda Misyakova is engaged in vocals in the Zaranak ensemble (V. I. Mulyavin art center). Since 2011, she took part in the project "I sing" of the ONT TV channel.

In 2013, Misyakova took part in the Belarusian national selection for the Junior Eurovision Song Contest 2013 with the song "Delovaya". She did not win and placed ninth, behind the winner Ilya Volkov and his song "Poy so mnoy".

In 2013, Nadia performed in the New era Quartet with Roma Svistunov, Elina Mataras and Vlad Luzhinsky. They performed the song "Karmashki" on the TV project "Pop cocktail" In 2015 they posted a song "Ordena".

In 2014, she returned to the Belarusian Junior Eurovision national selection with the song "Sokal". She finished in a joint first place with two other acts, but after a jury re-count was declared the winner.

In 2015, Nadezhda Misyakova posted a song "Khudozhnik" together with the singer Uzari.

== Discography ==
=== Singles ===
Year	Title	English translation	Album
2013	"Delovaya" (Деловая)	Business woman	Non-album single(s)
2014	"Sokal" (Сокал)	Falcon	Non-album single(s)
2015	"Ordena" (Ордена) (with Novaya Era)	Order	Non-album single(s)
2015	"Hudozhnik" (Художник) (with Uzari)	Artist	Non-album single(s)

=== Music Videos ===
- Sokal (2014)

Awards and achievements
Preceded by Ilya Volkov with Poy so mnoy	Belarus in the Junior Eurovision Song Contest; 2014	Succeeded by Ruslan Aslanov with Voshebstvo
