= Tu primo grande amore =

2014 single by Vincenzo Cantiello

Single by Vincenzo Cantiello
- Released: 3 October 2014
- Recorded: 2014
- Genre: Pop rock
- Length: 3:00

Vincenzo Cantiello singles chronology
"Glitter & Gold" (2013)	"Tu primo grande amore" (2014)	"All of Me" (2015)

Junior Eurovision Song Contest 2014 entry
- Country: Italy
- Artist: Vincenzo Cantiello
- Languages: Italian, English

Finals performance
- Final result: 1st
- Final points: 159

"Tu primo grande amore" ("You, first great love") is a song by Italian singer Vincenzo Cantiello. It represented Italy and was the winning song at the Junior Eurovision Song Contest 2014 in Marsa, Malta.

The song is about love at first sight and was written by Cantiello himself.

== Music video ==
The music video was released on 7 October 2014. It shows Cantiello singing on the stage of an empty theatre. A cell phone, resting on the theatre's steps, records his performance. At the end of the video, another cell phone is seen atop a pile of books. Its screen reads "Hi! Vincenzo has sent you a video clip :-)" and the song's title appears in a grey speech bubble underneath.
