= Hannah Brine =

British singer-songwriter and composer

Hannah Brine is a British singer, songwriter, and composer.

== Career ==
Brine's performance and songwriting genres include folk, pop, and jazz. She has had numerous collaborations with songwriters that include Michael Garvin, Emily Phillips, and Jeff Franzel.

Hannah released her debut album Blue Sky Now in June 2025, with a tour across the UK. Early pre-release reviews of the album cited it as "absolutely delightful" and that "it digs deep into life’s quiet heartbreaks, hard-won joys, and the bittersweet moments we often scroll past". Further reviews mention “Brine's voice is distinguished by its clarity, warmth and an inviting, rounded tone that draws the listener in” and “Hannah’s honey toned voice caresses the melodies imbuing the words with a lightness of touch”. Hannah was interviewed about her forthcoming album & launch gigs by Robert Elms on BBC Radio London on June 20, and two tracks from the album, Cobwebs & Lace and the title track Blue Sky Now, were also played.

Brine has sung in many venues including: The Birmingham Jazz Festival, Bridgewater Hall, Manchester, The Pheasantry in London, and both the Buxton Festival (where Brine supported Rumer (musician) in 2025) and the Buxton Fringe Festival, where her performance won her the ‘Best Solo Vocal’ award in 2024 & 2025. Brine lead the Summer Sundae choir in 2010, three years after organising her own choir in Leicester. She has also lead the Wilderness festival choir for the last six years.

Brine has performed alongside various artists including Gary Barlow, the lead singer of Take That.

She has written with and performed alongside record producer Boo Hewerdine and singer, songwriter, musician and record producer Clive Gregson. Brine has co-written a song with singer-songwriter Daisy Chute on their collaboration "Spirit of the Singers", which is also on Brine's Live at Fiction Studios EP.

Brine also wrote and sang vocals on You and I, for Ciaran McAauley & Roger Shah. This was Beatport Trance number 1 song in April 2022.

In 2019 Brine and DJs Genix and Ian Kerr climbed Mount Everest to break a record with the aid of a turntable deck. They also raised funds for Whizz Kids to assist mobile children to be more mobile with the assistance of a wheelchair.

Brine released a song to chronicle World Book Day in 2023.

She is one of the songwriters of the Cypriot entry in the Junior Eurovision Song Contest 2025 in Tbilisi, Georgia.

== Choirs ==
Brine is the founder of a number of choirs which include Didsbury Singers, Walthamstow Singers, Victoria Park Singers (founded in 2013), Finsbury Park Singers (founded 2018), Finsbury A Cappella, Forest Gate Singers (2025), Fosse Singers (2007), Bollington Singers (founded 2023), and High Peak Singers (2022). In 2015 Brine was nominated by various members of her choir and honoured as a BBC Music Day Unsung Hero for her work and innovation with community choirs, empowering voices to be able to express themselves via the medium of song.

Brine organised and trained choirs for the 2016 Royal Variety Show and was also one of the choir members who performed with Gary Barlow; in addition, she coordinated a choir performance to support the Calendar Girls (musical) cast at the 2017 Olivier Awards. Brine's choirs have performed with Andre J. Thomas and the London Symphony Orchestra and at the BBC Proms in 2019 in John Luther Adams' work ‘In the Name of the Earth’.
