= People of the Sun (Betty song) =

2014 single by Betty

Single by Betty
- Released: August 2014
- Recorded: May 2014
- Genre: Pop, dance
- Length: 2:40
(Armenia) "People of the Sun"
Junior Eurovision Song Contest 2014 entry
- Country: Armenia
- Artist: Elizabeth Danielyan
- As: Betty
- Languages: Armenian, English
Finals performance
- Final result: 3rd
- Final points: 146
Entry chronology
-

Music video
- "People of the Sun" on YouTube

"People of the Sun" is a song by Armenian child singer Betty. It represented Armenia at the Junior Eurovision Song Contest 2014, placing third with 146 points.

== Music video ==
The music video was released on YouTube on 29 October 2014, and is a unique "selfie video," which includes a bike trip around Yerevan and playing a guitar. This was taken from a humorous point of view by Wiwibloggs: "Do not try this at home!"

== Live Performances ==
=== National final ===
Betty first performed "People of the Sun" at Armenia's national final for the Junior Eurovision Song Contest 2014 on 14 September. At the end of broadcast, she earned the right to represent Armenia at the contest, held in Marsa, Malta.

=== Junior Eurovision ===
Betty's performance for Malta was very different from the national final. For the contest, Betty was joined by two dancers and three acrobats. At the close of the voting, Armenia placed third in a field of 16 songs, scoring 146 points.
