= Moira Delia =

Maltese television presenter and actress

- Born: 30 October 1971 (age 53); Malta
- Occupation(s): Television presenter, actress

Moira Delia (born 30 October 1971 in Malta) is a Maltese television presenter and actress. She hosted the Junior Eurovision Song Contest 2014 in Marsa, Malta and was the first person to single-handedly host the contest. Previously, Delia has hosted Malta's national selection for the Eurovision Song Contest.

== Filmography ==
Year	Title
2005	Angli: The Movie
2009	maltageddon

== See also ==
- List of Junior Eurovision Song Contest presenters
- Malta in the Junior Eurovision Song Contest
- Malta in the Eurovision Song Contest
