= Lina Kuduzović =

Slovenian singer (born 2002)

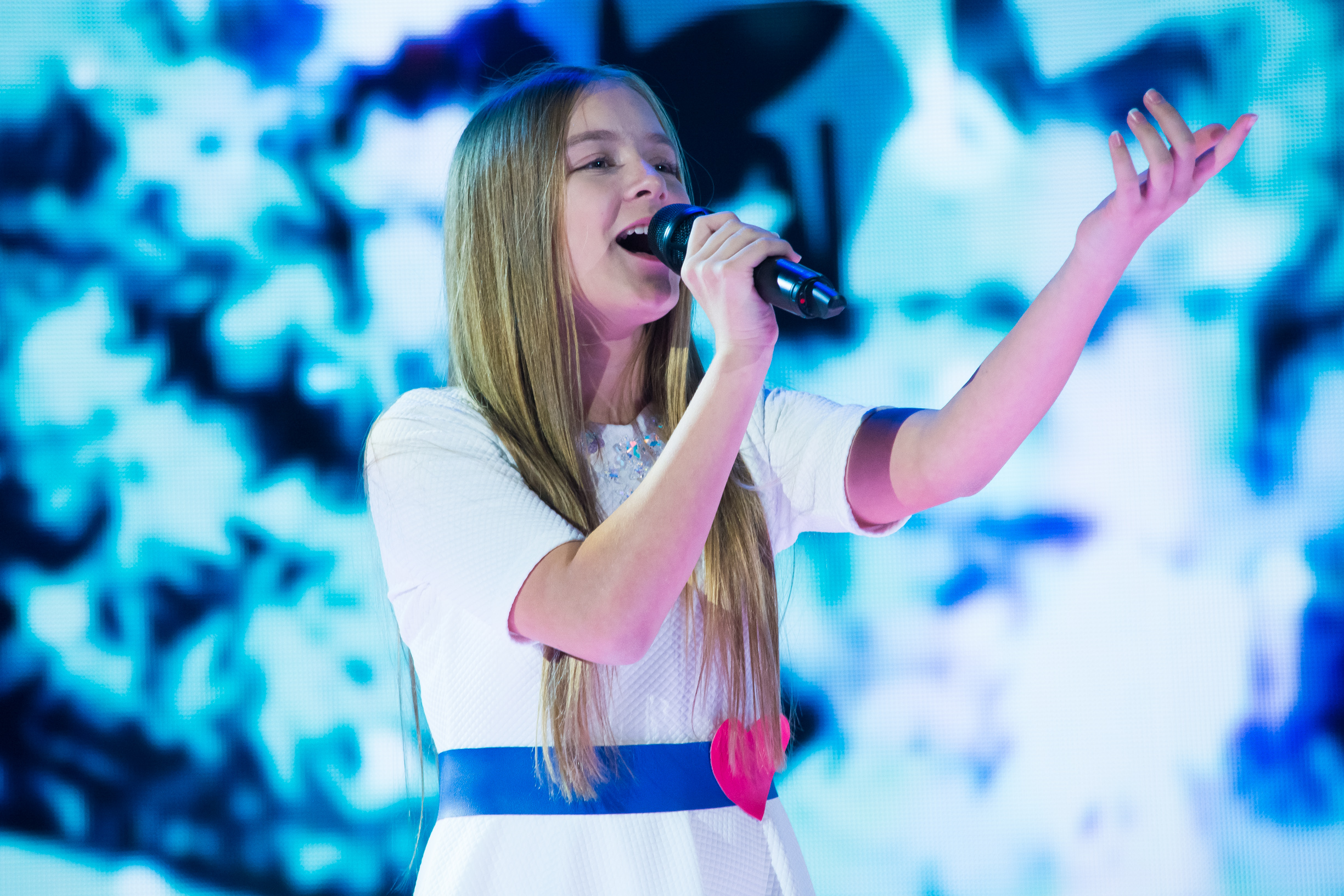

Background information
- Born: 30 December 2002 (age 23); Ljubljana, Slovenia
- Genre: Pop
- Occupation: Singer
- Instrument: Vocals
- Years active: 2010–present
- Website: linakuduzovic.com

Lina Kuduzović (born 30 December 2002) is a Slovenian singer who won the first season of Slovenia's Got Talent in 2010 when she was seven years old, making her the youngest winner of any Got Talent show to that time. In 2015 Kuduzović represented Slovenia at the Junior Eurovision Song Contest, with her song "Prva ljubezen" ("First love"). She ended 3rd with 112 points. In 2017, she auditioned for The Voice Kids Germany, making it to the finals. Currently, she lives in Switzerland with her family. In the Battle Round, she defeated Kayana and Ashley (also from Forster's team), all three of whom sang "The Greatest" (Sia). In the semi-finals, she performed "Hurt" again and was chosen by mentor Mark Foster for the finals. In the final, she sang "If I Were a Boy" (Beyoncé), which was not enough to win. The winner was 11-year-old Sophie.

Her first single, "Ephemeral," was released in 2018. She participated in EMA 2020 with the song, "Man Like U", where she finished second with 666 fewer votes.

== Discography ==
- Lina (2012)

Awards and achievements
| Preceded by First winner | Winner of Slovenija ima talent 2010 | Succeeded by Julija Kramar |
| Preceded by Ula Ložar | Slovenia in the Junior Eurovision Song Contest; 2015 | Succeeded by — |
