= Federica Falzon =

Maltese mezzo-soprano singer

- Born: Federica Falzon; 17 February 2003 (age 23); Safi, Malta
- Genres: Current: Pop; Former: Operatic pop, Classical crossover
- Occupation: Singer
- Instrument: Vocals
- Years active: 2011-present

Federica Falzon (born 17 February 2003) is a Maltese mezzo-soprano singer. She represented Malta at the Junior Eurovision Song Contest 2014 on home soil with the song "Diamonds", and placed 4th.

== Life and career ==
Federica Falzon was born on 17 February 2003 in a rural village named Safi, Malta (Maltese: Ħal Safi). She has been interested in music for most of her life, and has started singing at age 8. Her grandpa took her to karaoke clubs where most people encouraged her to take singing lessons. In 2011, Falzon sang in front of an audience for the first time at Festa Hiliet. There, she sang two songs - "Sailing" by The Sutherland Brothers, and "Rose Garden" by Lynn Anderson.

Federica started out as a country-pop singer, but discovered her passion for classical music through her vocal tutor and mentor Gillian Attard from Malta's La Voix Academy. Falzon has also taken part in Sanremo D.O.C. and won RAI UNO's Ti lascio una canzone 2014, despite not knowing any Italian when she arrived in Italy. In November 2013, Falzon won Ghanja Gmiel is-Seba Noti with an original song titled "Ilwien il-Holqien" (Nature's colours).

On 18 July, Falzon was one of the guest performers in the annual concert held on the Granaries Floriana by Maltese tenor and internationally acclaimed Joseph Calleja.

=== Junior Eurovision Song Contest 2014 ===
On 15 November 2014, Federica represented Malta at the Junior Eurovision Song Contest 2014 on home soil. According to lyricist Matt Muxu Mercieca, the song talks about how Federica finds her “way out of the storm” and how “together we can all shine, like diamonds in the sky.” The song placed 4th with 116 points.

== Discography ==
=== Singles ===
Year	Title	English translation	Album
2013	"Ilwien il-Holqien"	"Nature's Colours"	Non-album single(s)
2014	"Diamonds"	—	Non-album single(s)

Awards and achievements
Preceded by Gaia Cauchi with The Start	Malta in the Junior Eurovision Song Contest; 2014	Succeeded by Destiny Chukunyere with Not My Soul
