= Sophia Patsalides =

Greek Cypriot singer

- Born: Sofia Patsalidou
- Genre: Pop
- Occupation: Singer
- Instruments: Vocals, piano, music production
- Years active: 2004–present
- Website: sophiapatsalides.com

Sofia Patsalidou (Greek: Σοφία Πατσαλίδου; born 16 December 2000), known professionally as Sophia Patsalides, is a Greek Cypriot singer-songwriter. She represented Cyprus in the Junior Eurovision Song Contest 2014 with her song "I pio omorfi mera".

== Biography ==
On 21 July 2014, it was announced that she would represent Cyprus at the Junior Eurovision Song Contest 2014 with her song "I pio omorfi mera" (also rendered in English as "The Most Beautiful Day"), co-written by Patsalides alongside Alexandros Panayi (1995 and 2000 Eurovision representative for Cyprus) and Stavros Stavrou. At the contest, she placed ninth out of 16 participants. She subsequently released an album as well as multiple singles.

In October 2022, Patsalides opened for LP during her concert in Cyprus. In 2024, she performed at a Guinness World Record-breaking music event hosted at the Embassy of Brazil in London, representing Cyprus among artists from multiple countries.

She co-wrote the Cypriot entry for the Junior Eurovision Song Contest 2024, "Crystal Waters" performed by Maria Pissarides, alongside Pissarides and Armin Gilani. In September 2025, she was reported to be among the artists proposed by record labels to Cypriot broadcaster CyBC to represent Cyprus in the Eurovision Song Contest 2026, but was not eventually selected.

== Discography ==
| Year | Title | Album |
|---|---|---|
| 2014 | "I pio omorfi mera" (Η πιο όμορφη μέρα) | Non-album singles |
| 2015 | "The Love You Know" | Non-album singles |
| 2015 | "Can't Help Falling in Love" | Together as One |
| 2017 | "Deep Blue Ocean" | Together as One |
| 2017 | "Here for Christmas" | Non-album singles |
| 2018 | "Break Up the Silence" | Non-album singles |
| 2018 | "Everything I Ever Wanted" | —N/a |
| 2022 | "You, Me and Picasso" | —N/a |
| 2022 | "Island Halfway" | —N/a |
| 2023 | "Mess We Made" | —N/a |

Awards and achievements
| Preceded by Rafaella Kosta with "Thalassa, ilios, aeras, fotia" | Cyprus in the Junior Eurovision Song Contest; 2014 | Succeeded by George Michaelides with "Dance Floor" |
