= Betty (singer) =

Armenian singer

- Born: Elizabeth Danielyan; 7 March 2003 (age 23); Armenia
- Genres: Electropop
- Occupation: Singer
- Instrument: Vocals
- Website: betty.am

Elizabeth Danielyan (Armenian: Էլիզաբեթ Դանիելյան, born 7 March 2003), better known as simply Betty (Armenian: Բեթթի), is an Armenian singer. She represented Armenia in the Junior Eurovision Song Contest 2014 in Malta with her song "People of the Sun".

Besides her native Armenian, Betty also speaks Russian and English.

== Early life ==
Elizabeth Danielyan was born on 7 March 2003. Her birth was the greatest gift for her mother with her being born on International Women's Day. Being an active and musical child, she attended the State Choreographical School since the age of 4 and simultaneously attended school there. She went to School N.8 named after A. Pushkin since the age of 6 where she had excellent progress. She attended professional singing classes and individual dancing classes. Betty authored many songs and poems, she also plays the guitar and drums. In addition to this, Elizabeth attended the National Aesthetical Centre, where she studied embroidery, origami and drawing pottery.

== Career ==
Since August 2012 Betty hosted “The Magnificent Seven with Elizabeth” on “Kentron” TV and “Alone at home” on “H2” TV. Betty has experience in hosting TV broadcasting since her early age for she had often had many appearances in “Hayrenik” TV channel. Betty also received an offer from the most famous Armenian music channel 21TV to host the program "Betty Show". Betty loves to host those programs and to take part in those projects and events (TV programs, concerts, charity events) in which there is beauty, knowledge kind goals and high quality.

2012 was an abundant year for Betty not only in terms of TV broadcasting, but also concerts. As a guest she also participated in “Junior New Wave international contest. Elizabeth won many prizes in different contests such as the "Kangaroo" mathematical contest. In the summer of 2012 Betty took part in Junior Sports Olympiad which took place in Antalya, as such, she brought Armenia 4 golden medals (winning her competitors in mini golf, dart and jenga)

In 2013 Betty submitted an application for participation in "New Wave Junior" annual song contest and qualified for semifinal in Moscow. In 2013 Elizabeth Danielyan was named as "The Best Armenian Junior TV host" from the Public Television Company of Armenia.

In 2014 Betty decided to submit an application for the Armenian national selection of Junior Eurovision 2014. From 87 participants Betty won the trip to Malta. Betty represented Armenia In Junior Eurovision 2014 and ended 3rd with only 1 point less from 2nd place's participant, Bulgaria.

In 2014 Betty received a special prize from the Annual National Junior Music Award for Representing Armenia in Junior Eurovision.

== Social media ==
- Facebook
- Betty on Instagram
- Twitter
- SoundCloud
- Youtube

Awards and achievements
Preceded by Monica Avanesyan with Choco Factory	Armenia in the Junior Eurovision Song Contest; 2014	Succeeded by Michael Varosyan (MIKA) with Love
