= Montenegro in the Junior Eurovision Song Contest =

- Junior Eurovision Song Contest
- Participating broadcaster: Radio and Television of Montenegro (RTCG)

Participation summary
- Appearances: 4
- First appearance: 2014
- Highest placement: 12th: 2026
- Participation history: 2014; 2015; 2016 – 2024; 2025
- For the most recent participation see Montenegro in the Junior Eurovision Song Contest 2026

Montenegro has been represented at the Junior Eurovision Song Contest since 2014. The Montenegrin participating broadcaster in the contest is Radio i Televizija Crne Gore (RTCG). After taking part in the 2014 and 2015 contests, RTCG withdrew from the contest. They returned to the contest in 2025.

Prior to its debut as an independent nation, Montenegro participated at the Junior Eurovision Song Contest 2005 as part of Serbia and Montenegro.

== History ==
Prior to the Montenegrin independence referendum in 2006 which culminated into the dissolution of Serbia and Montenegro, both nations use to compete at the Junior Eurovision Song Contest and Eurovision Song Contest as Serbia and Montenegro. Serbia were the first of the two nations to compete at Junior Eurovision Song Contest making their debut at the Junior Eurovision Song Contest 2006.

On 18 July 2014, it was announced that Montenegro would debut at the Junior Eurovision Song Contest 2014 as an independent nation. On 21 August 2014, it was revealed that 14 year-old Montenegrin singer Maša Vujadinović and 12 year-old Montenegrin-American singer Lejla Vulić would represent the nation at the contest with the song "Budi dijete na jedan dan" (Montenegrin: Буди дијете на један дан, English: Be a child for a day). The running order draw for the contest took place on 9 November 2014, and Montenegro was drawn to perform 10th at the 15 November contest, following Slovenia and preceding Italy. At the close of the voting, Montenegro placed 14th in a field of 16 songs, scoring 24 points.

On 1 July 2015, the Montenegrin national broadcaster RTCG announced that Jana Mirković had been internally selected to represent Montenegro in the Junior Eurovision Song Contest 2015, performing the song "Oluja". For the performance at the contest, Jana Mirković and her four dancers were dressed in costumes: a green dress and dark blue jacket for the Montenegrin representative, and entirely dark blue dresses for the backing dancers. The backdrop began with clouds and rain and transitioned into a colorful city night-scene as the performance progressed. Following the release of the full split voting by the EBU after the conclusion of the competition, it was revealed that Montenegro had placed 14th with the public televote and 12th with the jury vote. In the public vote, Montenegro scored 23 points, while with the jury vote, the entry scored 21 points. The nation withdrew from the contest in 2016.

In January 2024, RTCG announced that it intended to broadcast the Junior Eurovision Song Contest 2024, raising the possibility of a return to the contest. However, Montenegro was not on the final list of participants published by the EBU on the 3 September 2024. RTCG ultimately also opted not to broadcast the 2024 contest.

In June 2025, RTCG announced Montenegro's participation in the 2025 contest in Tbilisi, stating that their return represents a new opportunity to affirm young talents and promote Montenegrin music on the international stage. Asja Džogović was internally selected by RTCG to represent the country with "I tužna i srećna priča", which ultimately placed seventeenth in a field of eighteen. This marked Montenegro's lowest placing in the contest to date. RTCG continued its presence at the 2026 contest, confirming participation in July 2026. The broadcaster internally selected Mija Vujović with "Muzika nas spaja" to represent Montenegro, with the country going on to achieve its highest placing in any Eurovision event, finishing twelfth in a field of 16 with 68 points. The entry finished in sixth place in the televote.

== Participation overview ==
Prior to Serbia and Montenegro's dissolution, the selected artist was from the Montenegrin republic unit and represented Serbia and Montenegro in 2005. This was the only time the country competed before the union dissolved.

Year	Artist	Song	Language	Place	Points
2014	Maša Vujadinović and Lejla Vulić	"Budi dijete na jedan dan" (Буди дијете на један дан)	Montenegrin, English	14	24
2015	Jana Mirković	"Oluja" (Олуја)	Montenegrin	13	36
2025	Asja Džogović	"I tužna i srećna priča" (И тужна и срећна прича)	Montenegrin	17	49
2026	Mija Vujović	"Muzika nas spaja" (Музика нас спаја)	Montenegrin	12	68

== Commentators and spokespersons ==
The contests are broadcast online worldwide through the official Junior Eurovision Song Contest website junioreurovision.tv and YouTube. In 2015, the online broadcasts featured commentary in English by junioreurovision.tv editor Luke Fisher and 2011 Bulgarian Junior Eurovision Song Contest entrant Ivan Ivanov. The Montenegrin broadcaster, RTCG, sent their own commentators to each contest in order to provide commentary in the Montenegrin language. Spokespersons were also chosen by the national broadcaster in order to announce the awarding points from Montenegro. The table below list the details of each commentator and spokesperson since 2014.

Year(s)	Channel	Commentator	Spokesperson	Ref.
2014	TVCG 2, TVCG SAT	Dražen Bauković and Tamara Ivanković	Aleksandra	
2015	TVCG 2 (live), TVCG SAT (delayed)	Dražen Bauković and Tamara Ivanković	Lejla Vulić	
2016–2024	No broadcast		Did not participate	N/A
2025	TVCG 2	Dražen Bauković	Sofia	
2026	TVCG 2	Antonela Martinović & Vlado Perović	Asja Džogović	

== See also ==
- Montenegro in the Eurovision Song Contest – Senior version of the Junior Eurovision Song Contest.
