= Cyprus in the Junior Eurovision Song Contest =

- Junior Eurovision Song Contest
- Participating broadcaster: Cyprus Broadcasting Corporation (CyBC)

Participation summary
- Appearances: 12
- First appearance: 2003
- Highest placement: 8th: 2004, 2006
- Host: 2008
- Participation history: 2003; 2004; ~~2005~~; 2006; 2007; 2008; 2009; 2010 – 2013; 2014; 2015; 2016; 2017; 2018 – 2023; 2024; 2025; 2026
- For the most recent participation see Cyprus in the Junior Eurovision Song Contest 2026

Cyprus has been represented at the Junior Eurovision Song Contest 12 times since debuting at the first contest in 2003. The Cypriot participating broadcaster in the contest is the Cyprus Broadcasting Corporation (CyBC). Its best result was eighth place, which was achieved both at the 2004 and 2006 contests with "Oneira" by Marios Tofi and "Agoria koritsia" by Luis Panagiotou and Christina Christofi respectively. CyBC has hosted the event for Cyprus once, in 2008 in Limassol. After a hiatus from 2018 to 2023, CyBC returned to the contest in 2024.

== History ==
The Cyprus Broadcasting Corporation (CyBC) debuted Cyprus at the Junior Eurovision Song Contest 2003. For its first entry, CyBC opened the submission period for artists and composers to submit their entries until 12 September 2003. From all 29 songs submitted to CyBC, Theodora Rafti was selected as the Cypriot entrant. Her entry "Mia efhi" was presented during the television program Ora Kyprou (Cypriot time) on 15 September. At the contest, the song was performed third in the running order and placed 14th out of the 16 entries, with 16 points. For the 2004 contest, a ten-participant national final hosted by Nikos Bogiatzis was held on 7 September 2004. The winner was chosen by a 50/50 combination of votes from a professional jury and public televoting. Only the televoting results were revealed, which Marios Tofi and the song "Oneira" won, with Louis Panagiotis placing second and Rafail Georgiou & Anna Loizou placing in third. At the contest, Cyprus improved from the year prior, performing ninth in the running order and placing 8th out of the 18 entries.

Despite hosting a ten-participant national final and selecting Rena Kiriakidi with the song "Tsirko", the nation was absent from the 2005 contest due to an "internal issue" with the selected song; the country's late withdrawal; however, allowed the Cypriot public to still vote that year. Cyprus returned for the 2006 contest with the song "Agoria koritsia" performed by Luis Panagiotou and Christina Christofi. Similar to 2004, the entry had been selected by a national final. The eight-participant event took place on 30 September 2006 and the winner was chosen by a combination of votes from a professional jury (40%) and public televoting (60%). As there was a tie at the end of the voting with Sotiris Charalampous and "Prosefchi", the results of the televoting took precedence sending "Agoria koritsia" to Bucharest. At the contest, the song was performed second in the running order and placed eighth out of the 15 participants. The next year, a similar eight-participant national final was held, only that instead, the winner was chosen by a 50/50 combination of votes from a professional jury and public televoting. The final was held on 29 September 2007, and Yiorgos Ioannides was selected with the song "I mousiki dinei ftera". At the contest, the song was performed fourth in the running order and placed 14th out of the 17 entries, garnering 29 points.

Two more eight-participant national finals selected the Cypriot entries in 2008 and 2009. For the 2008 contest, which was hosted by CyBC in Limassol, Cyprus, the final was held on 28 June 2008 and was hosted by Christiana Stavrou and Kiriakos Pastides. The winner was chosen by a combination of votes from a professional jury (40%) and public televoting (60%). Elena Mannouri and Charis Savva represented the country with the song "Gioupi gia!", which was performed last (15th) at the contest and placed 10th with 46 points. The entry for 2009 was Rafaella Kosta represented the country with the song "Thalassa, ilios, aeras, fotia". The final was held on 3 October 2009 and was hosted by Grigoriadis Christos and Mary Kanther. The winner was chosen by a 50/50 combination of votes from a professional jury (which included Christina Metaxa who represented Cyprus in the Eurovision Song Contest 2009) and public televoting. At the contest, the song was performed eighth on the night and placed 11th out of the 13 participants.

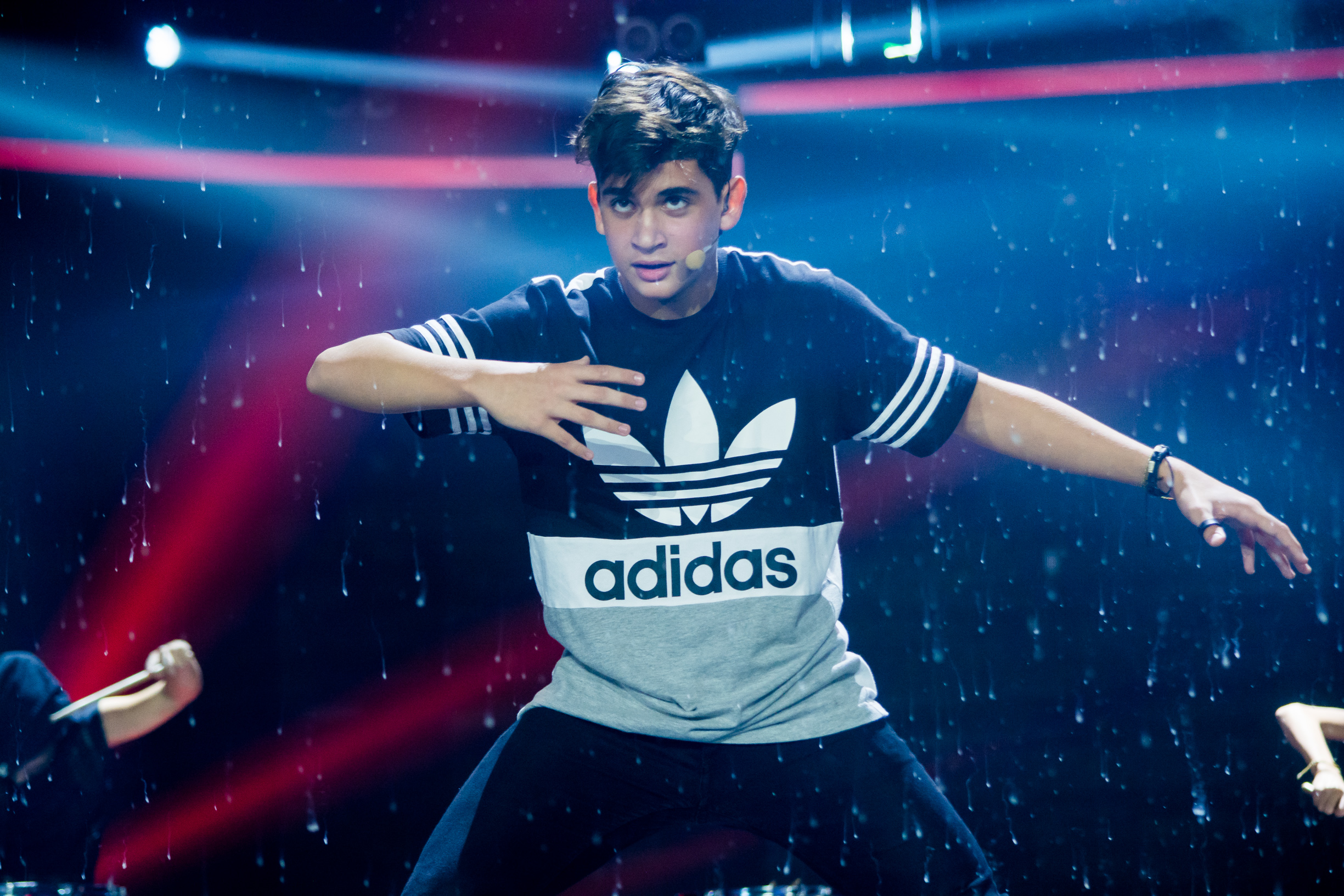
George Michaelides representing Cyprus in the 2016 contest with the song "Dance Floor".

Cyprus did not participate in 2010 because of unspecified reasons. Although CyBC was in talks with the EBU to return to the contest in 2013, it subsequently did not. On 3 July 2014, CyBC announced its return to the competition after a four-year absence, and its entry, Sophia Patsalides with the song "I pio omorfi mera", was selected internally by the broadcaster and announced on 21 July. At the contest, Cyprus finished in ninth place out of 16 participating entries. Although Cyprus did not participate in the 2015 contest for financial reasons, the nation returned for the 2016 contest, only to place in the bottom two at both events: second-to-last in 2016 with George Michaelides and the song "Dance Floor" in Valletta, Malta and last in the 2017 contest with Nicole Nicolaou and the song "I Wanna Be a Star" in Tbilisi, Georgia. The latter marked the country's worst result in the contest. Both of these entries had been selected internally by the broadcaster. The following year, on 11 June 2018, CyBC announced that they would not participate in the contest in the 2018 contest, with no reasons of their withdrawal being published.

On 21 August 2024, CyBC announced it would return to the contest in 2024 after a six-year absence, having internally selected Maria Pissarides – an eleven-year-old student of a performing arts school in the United Kingdom – to represent the country. Pissarides was selected following an evaluation of a proposal made by the production company Chandal Entertainment Ltd, which also subsequently announced auditions to select dancers who would join the singer on stage, and the spokesperson for the Cypriot jury at the final. The song, titled "Crystal Waters", written by Armin Gilani, Sophia Patsalides and Pissarides herself, was presented to the public on 30 September during the breakfast television show Omorfi mera ("Beautiful day") on RIK 1; a special listening session reserved for the press was previously held at the Event Hall of the CyBC Archive in Nicosia on 27 September. Pissarides' performance at the contest was staged by Layla Ellison. She was accompanied on stage by four dancers: Adriana Markich, Andriana Polemiti, Ciara Economopoulos and Danae Petrou. At the end of voting, Pissarides brought Cyprus its best result since 2014, placing 13th with 60 points.

On 14 July 2025, CyBC confirmed its intention to participate in the 2025 contest and to continue to internally select its representative, opening a submission period where artists and composers would be able to submit their entries for the competition until the following 8 September. At the closing of the period, applications from 70 artists and 20 entries had been received. The selection was carried out by a committee composed of Spyros Spyrou, 2025 Cypriot adult contest representative Theo Evan, Salomi Hatzineophytou, Marios Kallenos and Zoe Kyriakou following an audition round held on 13 and 14 September 2025 at the CyBC studios in Nicosia. The selected artists were revealed to be Rafaella Panteli and Christos Georgiou on 23 September. Their competing entry, "Away", was written by Andy Lys, Christopher Wortley, Greig Watts, Hannah Brine, Paul Drew and Peter Barringer, and released on 6 November. Cyprus placed 16th in the final, scoring 50 points; 47 points from the online vote and 3 points from the juries.

On 12 June 2026, CyBC confirmed its intention to participate in the 2026 contest and opened separate submission periods for artists and songs, opened until 30 June and 8 July, respectively. The broadcaster received 209 applications at the closing of the deadline and shortlisted 45 artists for an audition round, which concluded on 10 July, with Harry Georgiou subsequently announced as the Cypriot representative on 13 July during the RIK Central News Bulletin. His entry "Who I Can Be", written by Anna-Klara Folin, Laurell Barker, Nathalie Brydolf, Thomas Stengaard and Victoria Chalkitis, was released on 24 September 2026. Cyprus placed 10th in the final, scoring 98 points; 46 points from the online vote and 52 points from the juries.

In July 2026, CyBC announced that it had adopted a new policy of participating in all three EBU music competitions, including the Junior Eurovision Song Contest.

== Participation overview ==
Table key
◁	Last place
◇	Entry selected but did not compete

Year	Artist	Song	Language	Place	Points
2003	Theodora Rafti	"Mia efhi" (Μια ευχή)	Greek	14	16
2004	Marios Tofi	"Oneira" (Όνειρα)	Greek	8	61
2005	Rena Kiriakidi ◇	"Tsirko" (Τσίρκο) ◇	Greek ◇	Withdrew (Note: Although Cyprus did not participate in 2005, their late withdrawal allowed them to retain the right to vote in the contest.)	
2006	Luis Panagiotou and Christina Christofi	"Agoria koritsia" (Αγόρια κορίτσια)	Greek	8	58
2007	Yiorgos Ioannides	"I mousiki dinei ftera" (Η μουσική δίνει φτερά)	Greek	14	29
2008	Elena Mannouri and Charis Savva	"Gioupi gia!" (Γιούπι για!)	Greek	10	46
2009	Rafaella Costa	"Thalassa, ilios, aeras, fotia" (Θάλασσα, ήλιος, αέρας, φωτιά)	Greek	11	32
2014	Sophia Patsalides	"I pio omorfi mera" (Η πιο όμορφη μέρα)	Greek, English	9	69
2016	George Michaelides	"Dance Floor"	Greek, English	16	27
2017	Nicole Nicolaou	"I Wanna Be a Star"	Greek, English	16 ◁	45
2024	Maria Pissarides	"Crystal Waters"	Greek, English	13	60
2025	Rafaella and Christos	"Away"	Greek, English	16	50
2026	Harry Georgiou	"Who I Can Be"	Greek, English	10	98

== Commentators and spokespersons ==
The contests are broadcast online worldwide through the official Junior Eurovision Song Contest website junioreurovision.tv and YouTube. In 2015, the online broadcasts featured commentary in English by junioreurovision.tv editor Luke Fisher and 2011 Bulgarian Junior Eurovision Song Contest entrant Ivan Ivanov. The Cypriot broadcaster, CyBC, sent their own commentator to each contest in order to provide commentary in the Greek language and English languages. Spokespersons were also chosen by the national broadcaster in order to announce the awarding points from Cyprus. The table below list the details of each commentator and spokesperson since 2003.

Year(s)	Commentator	Spokesperson	Ref.
2003	Katerina Karagianni	Tina Nikolaou	
2004	Neoklis Papas	Stella Maria Koukides	
2005	Aggelos Stamatos	Stella Maria Koukides	
2006	Kyriakos Pastides	George Ioannidies	
2007	Kyriakos Pastides	Natalie Michael	
2008	Kyriakos Pastides	Christina Christofi	
2009	Kyriakos Pastides	George Ioannidies	
2010–2013	No broadcast	Did not participate	N/A
2014	Kyriakos Pastides	Paris Nicolaou	
2015	No broadcast	Did not participate	N/A
2016	Kyriakos Pastides	Loucas Demetriou	
2017	Kyriakos Pastides	Maria Christophorou	
2018–2023	No broadcast	Did not participate	N/A
2024	Kyriakos Pastides	Patroklos Patroklou	
2025	Kyriakos Pastides	Stephani Constantinou	
2026	Kyriakos Pastides	Christos Georgiou	

== Hostings ==
Year	Location	Venue	Presenters
2008	Limassol	Spyros Kyprianou Athletic Centre	Sophia Paraskeva & Alex Michael

== See also ==
- Cyprus in the Eurovision Song Contest
