= Unbreakable Tour (Tori Kelly) =

2016–17 concert tour by Tori Kelly

- Tour by Tori Kelly
- Associated album: Unbreakable Smile
- Start date: April 5, 2016
- End date: May 7, 2017
- Legs: 2
- No. of shows: 37 in North America; 37 Total

Tori Kelly concert chronology
- Where I Belong Tour (2015-16); Unbreakable Tour (2016–17); Hiding Place Tour (2018)

The Unbreakable Tour is the third concert tour by Tori Kelly, in support of her debut studio album Unbreakable Smile (2015). The tour began in San Diego, California at Humphreys Concerts By the Bay on April 5, 2016, and concluded its 37-city run on May 7, 2017, in Memphis, Tennessee at the Tom Lee Park.

== Background and development ==
On January 12, 2016, Tori Kelly announced her debut album would be re-released on January 29, 2016 with new songs "Hollow" and "Something Beautiful". In honor of the re-release, she also announced she would be embarking on her second tour for the album (previously embarking on her Where I Belong Tour in 2015).

== Set list ==
This set list is representative of the show on April 6, 2016 in Tempe, Arizona. It is not representative of all concerts for the duration of the tour.

1. "Where I Belong"
2. "Unbreakable Smile"
3. "Expensive"
4. "Anyway"
5. "Nobody Love"
6. "Falling Slow"
7. "First Heartbreak" / "Art of Letting You Go" / "Paper Hearts"
8. "Daydream"
9. "Beautiful Things"
10. "Suit & Tie" / "P.Y.T. (Pretty Young Thing)" / "Thinkin Bout You"
11. "Confetti"
12. "Funny"
13. "I Was Made for Loving You"
14. "City Dove"
15. "Talk"
16. "Something Beautiful"
17. "All in My Head" / "Dear No One"

Encore

18. "Hollow"
19. "Should've Been Us"

== Shows ==
List of concerts, showing date, city, country, venue, opening act, tickets sold, number of available tickets and amount of gross revenue
| Date | City | Country | Venue | Opening acts | Attendance | Revenue |
North America
| April 5, 2016 | San Diego | United States | Humphreys Concerts By The Bay | Thirdstory | —N/a | —N/a |
| April 6, 2016 | Tempe | United States | Marquee Theatre | Thirdstory | —N/a | —N/a |
| April 8, 2016 | Dallas | United States | South Side Ballroom | Thirdstory | —N/a | —N/a |
| April 9, 2016 | Tulsa | United States | Brady Theater | Thirdstory | —N/a | —N/a |
| April 10, 2016 | Houston | United States | Revention Music Center | Thirdstory | —N/a | —N/a |
| April 12, 2016 | Nashville | United States | Ryman Auditorium | Thirdstory | —N/a | —N/a |
| April 13, 2016 | Birmingham | United States | Iron City | Thirdstory | 1,300 / 1,300 | $40,950 |
| April 15, 2016 | Atlanta | United States | The Tabernacle | Thirdstory | —N/a | —N/a |
| April 16, 2016 | Orlando | United States | Hard Rock Café | Thirdstory | —N/a | —N/a |
| April 17, 2016 | Miami Beach | United States | Fillmore Miami Beach | Thirdstory | —N/a | —N/a |
| April 19, 2016 | Tampa | United States | The Ritz Ybor | Thirdstory | 1,383 / 1,383 | $36,549 |
| April 21, 2016 | Charlotte | United States | The Fillmore | Thirdstory | —N/a | —N/a |
| April 22, 2016 | Norfolk | United States | The Norva | Thirdstory | —N/a | —N/a |
| April 23, 2016 | Washington, D.C. | United States | DAR Constitution Hall | Thirdstory | —N/a | —N/a |
| April 25, 2016 | Philadelphia | United States | Electric Factory | Thirdstory | —N/a | —N/a |
| April 26, 2016 | Sayreville | United States | Starland Ballroom | Thirdstory | —N/a | —N/a |
| April 28, 2016 | New York City | United States | Beacon Theatre | Thirdstory | 5,431 / 5,431 | $198,298 |
| April 29, 2016 | New York City | United States | Beacon Theatre | Thirdstory | 5,431 / 5,431 | $198,298 |
| April 30, 2016 | Boston | United States | House of Blues | Thirdstory | 2,438 / 2,593 | $74,385 |
| May 2, 2016 | Montreal | Canada | Métropolis | Thirdstory | 1,603 / 2,000 | $44,849 |
| May 3, 2016 | Toronto | Canada | Massey Hall | Thirdstory | —N/a | —N/a |
| May 5, 2016 | Royal Oak | United States | Royal Oak Music Theatre | Thirdstory | —N/a | —N/a |
| May 6, 2016 | Rosemont | United States | Rosemont Theatre | Thirdstory | —N/a | —N/a |
| May 7, 2016 | Madison | United States | Orpheum Theatre | Thirdstory | —N/a | —N/a |
| May 9, 2016 | Minneapolis | United States | Northrop Auditorium | Thirdstory | —N/a | —N/a |
| May 10, 2016 | Omaha | United States | Sokol Auditorium | Thirdstory | —N/a | —N/a |
| May 12, 2016 | Denver | United States | Ogden Theatre | Thirdstory | —N/a | —N/a |
| May 13, 2016 | Salt Lake City | United States | The Complex | Thirdstory | —N/a | —N/a |
| May 15, 2016 | Vancouver | Canada | Queen Elizabeth Theatre | Thirdstory | —N/a | —N/a |
| May 16, 2016 | Seattle | United States | Paramount Theatre | Thirdstory | —N/a | —N/a |
| May 18, 2016 | Oakland | United States | Fox Oakland Theatre | Thirdstory | 5,650 / 5,650 | $183,820 |
| May 19, 2016 | Oakland | United States | Fox Oakland Theatre | Thirdstory | 5,650 / 5,650 | $183,820 |
| May 21, 2016 | Los Angeles | United States | Greek Theatre | Thirdstory | —N/a | —N/a |
| July 9, 2016^{[A]} | San Diego | United States | Embarcadero Marina Park South | —N/a | —N/a | —N/a |
| August 20, 2016^{[B]} | Atlanta | United States | Turner Field | —N/a | —N/a | —N/a |
| May 6, 2017^{[C]} | West Palm Beach | United States | Downtown West Palm Beach | —N/a | —N/a | —N/a |
| May 7, 2017^{[D]} | Memphis | United States | Tom Lee Park | —N/a | —N/a | —N/a |
| Total | | | | | 17,805 / 18,457 | $578,851 |

Festivals and other miscellaneous performances
^{A} This concert is a part of the All-Star Concert Series Part of the Pepsi Music Series
^{B} This concert is a part of the Braves Summer Concert Series presented by Coca-Cola and Delta Air Lines
^{C} This concert is a part of SunFest
^{D} This concert is a part of the Beale Street Music Festival
