= Unbreakable Tour =

Unbreakable Tour may refer to:

- Unbreakable Tour (Backstreet Boys), 2008–2009
- Unbreakable World Tour (Janet Jackson), 2015–2016
- Unbreakable World Tour (Scorpions), 2004–2006
- Unbreakable Tour (Tori Kelly), 2016
- Unbreakable Tour (Westlife), 2003
