= Malta in the Junior Eurovision Song Contest 2015 =

- Junior Eurovision Song Contest 2015
- Participating broadcaster: Public Broadcasting Services (PBS)
- Country: Malta
- Selection process: Artist: Malta Junior Eurovision Song Contest 2015; Song: Internal selection
- Selection date: Artist: 11 July 2015; Song: 24 October 2015

Competing entry
- Song: "Not My Soul"
- Artist: Destiny Chukunyere
- Songwriters: Destiny Chukunyere; Matthew "Muxu" Mercieca; Elton Zarb

Placement
- Final result: 1st, 185 points

Participation chronology

Malta was represented at the Junior Eurovision Song Contest 2015 with the song "Not My Soul", written by Destiny Chukunyere, Matthew "Muxu" Mercieca, and Elton Zarb, and performed by Destiny herself. The Maltese participating broadcaster, Public Broadcasting Services (PBS), selected its artist through a national selection on 11 July 2015, while the song was selected internally. The song won the competition with a record of 185 points, breaking the previous record set by Spain in 2004.

The twenty acts competing to represent Malta were released on 26 June 2015. They performed covers or non-Eurovision candidate songs during the national final, and the winner's Junior Eurovision song was revealed at a later date.

== National final ==
Each of the 20 participants sang a song of their own choice. After all of them had performed, the jury and televoting cast their votes - each juror had a 25% weighting in the final result (so 75% overall), with the televoting also having a 25% share. The contestants were ranked from 1-20, with 1 being the best. Destiny Chukunyere was announced as the winner of the national final.

R/O	Artist	Song	Place
1	Nicole Frendo	"I'm Not the Only One"	
2	Raisa Marie Micallef	"Wishing You Were Here Somehow Again"	
3	Sarah Micallef	"Respect"	
4	Nicole Sciberras	"I Will Be"	
5	Veronica Rotin	"Mamma Knows Best"	2
6	Ilenia Camilleri	"One Night Only"	
7	Francesca Dimech	"Blank Space"	
8	Aidan Cassar	"Kemm hu sabiħ"	
9	Christina Magrin	"I Surrender"	3
10	Thea Aquilina	"That's Life"	
11	Andy Shaw	"Breakeven"	
12	Sarah Farrugia	"Skinny Love"	
13	Kelsey Farrugia	"Strange Birds"	
14	Destiny Chukunyere	"Think"	1
15	Gabrielle Portelli	"I Could Have Danced All Night"	
16	Haley Azzopardi	"And I Am Telling You I'm Not Going"	
17	Amy Marie Borg	"Wishing You Were Here Somehow Again"	
18	Rebecca Scicluna Rizzo	"Yours"	
19	Isaac Mercieca	"Mama"	
20	Victoria Sciberras	"Feeling Good"	

== At Junior Eurovision ==
At the running order draw which took place on 15 November 2015, Malta were drawn to perform fifteenth on 21 November 2015, following San Marino and preceding Albania.

=== Voting ===
Points awarded to Malta
Score	Country
12 points (Note: All countries received one set of 12 points to ensure no country finished with nul points.)	Albania; Armenia; Australia; Bulgaria; Kids Jury; San Marino; Serbia; Slovenia
10 points	Belarus; Georgia; Ireland; Italy; Montenegro; Netherlands
8 points	
7 points	
6 points	Russia; Ukraine
5 points	Macedonia
4 points	
3 points	
2 points	
1 point	

Points awarded by Malta
Score	Country
12 points	Italy
10 points	Australia
8 points	Bulgaria
7 points	Armenia
6 points	Ireland
5 points	Montenegro
4 points	Belarus
3 points	Slovenia
2 points	Albania
1 point	Georgia

==== Detailed voting results ====
The following members comprised the Maltese jury:

- Amber Bondin
- Georgina Abela
- Christabelle Borg
- Dorian Cassar
- Deborah Cassar

Detailed voting results from Malta
Draw	Country	A. Bondin	G. Abela	C. Borg	D. Cassar	D. Cassar	Average Jury Points	Televoting Points	Points Awarded
01	Serbia	5	1					1	
02	Georgia	12		8	6	5	6		1
03	Slovenia	1		1		2		6	3
04	Italy	8	8	5	8	12	12	8	12
05	Netherlands	3	4	4	4		4		
06	Australia	6	10	7	10	1	7	10	10
07	Ireland		5		1	6	3	7	6
08	Russia			6		3			
09	Macedonia			2					
10	Belarus	7	3	12		8	5	2	4
11	Armenia		12	3	12	10	8	5	7
12	Ukraine				2				
13	Bulgaria	4	6				1	12	8
14	San Marino				5	4		3	
15	Malta								
16	Albania	2	2		7		2	4	2
17	Montenegro	10	7	10	3	7	10		5
