= Veronica Rotin =

Maltese singer

- Born: 4 March 2004 (age 21); Tarxien, Malta
- Genres: Pop; soul; ballad; blues; gospel; jazz; R&B; rock; folk; disco
- Occupation: Singer
- Instrument: Vocals
- Years active: 2013–present

Veronica Rotin (Maltese pronunciation: [vɛˈrɔnɪkɐ rɔˈtiːn]; born 4 March 2004) is a Maltese singer. She has had some success at international singing competitions. In 2014, she released her self-titled debut album.

== Early life ==
Veronica Rotin was born on 4 March 2004 in Tarxien, Malta. When she was 2 years old her family moved to Melbourne, Australia. She started singing along with her older sister, Kelly, when she was 3 years old and quickly started singing to everything she heard on the radio. At 8 years of age, after the family had returned to Malta, Veronica started taking singing lessons from Gillian Attard at La Voix Academy in Marsa.

== Competitions ==
=== Io canto ===
In 2013 Rotin, aged just 9 years old, competed in the popular Italian TV show Io canto, where she sang the songs "And I Am Telling You I'm Not Going", "Perdere l'amore", "Adagio", "Proud Mary", "All by Myself" and "Last Dance". Rotin's team made it through to the final but failed to win the public vote.

=== Cantagiro ===
Rotin, along with other students from the La Voix Academy, took part in the Italian singing competition Cantagiro, where she won the Junior section.

=== Ezerski Biseri ===
In 2014 Rotin competed in the World Festival Association's (WAF) XI International contest for young talents Ezerski Biseri (Lake Pearls), held in Macedonia, in the "solo pop singer" category and she won the Grand Prix against competitors from Macedonia and all over the world.

=== Next Star ===
In 2014 Rotin took part in the Romanian TV talent show Next Star where she sang a cover of the Jessie J song "Mamma Knows Best" which won her a place in the "People's Choice Awards", the final of the series, where she sang the song "And I Am Telling You" from the musical Dreamgirls.

=== Tra sogno e realtà ===
In 2015 Rotin competed in the Italian TV talent show Tra sogno e realtà ("Between Dreams and Reality") for singers, dancers, actors, musicians, and other artists aged between 5 and 16 years. Rotin made it to the final of the show and finished in second place and was the highest placed singer in the competition.

== Junior Eurovision Song Contest ==
Rotin performed as part of the Interval Act, performing while the public vote and the votes are tallied, during the Junior Eurovision Song Contest 2014 that was held in Malta.

In 2015 she was one of the finalists in the Malta Junior Eurovision Song Contest (MJESC) where the representative of Malta for the Junior Eurovision Song Contest 2015 was chosen. During the final Rotin sang the Jessie J song "Mamma Knows Best" and finished in second place.

In 2016 she competed once again in the national selection to select the Maltese representative for the Junior Eurovision Song Contest 2016. This time she sang "I Will Always Love You" and was unplaced, with Christina Magrin winning the competition.

== Radio ==
Rotin is a co-host, along with Gaia Cauchi, George Cremona and Martha Carabott, of the radio program "Is-Sewwa Magħruf" on RTK 103FM radio in Malta.

== Discography ==
=== Albums ===
- Veronica Rotin is her first album. It was recorded in 2014 by Elton Zarb at FreeTime Studios and contains 14 tracks of cover versions, mostly songs that she has sung in singing competitions and on Maltese TV. It was released by Ironic PR & Artist Management, of Marsa, Malta.

=== Other appearances ===
Year	Song	Album
2013	"And I Am Telling You I'm Not Going"	Io Canto 4
