= Malta in the Junior Eurovision Song Contest 2016 =

- Junior Eurovision Song Contest 2016
- Country: Malta
- Selection process: Artist: Malta Junior Eurovision Song Contest 2016; Song: Internal selection
- Selection date: Artist: 16 July 2016; Song: 27 October 2016

Competing entry
- Song: "Parachute"
- Artist: Christina Magrin
- Songwriters: Florent Boshnjaku; Matt "Muxu" Mercieca; Christina Magrin

Placement
- Final result: 6th, 191 points

Participation chronology

Malta was represented at the Junior Eurovision Song Contest 2016 as the host country. The Maltese entrant for the 2016 contest in Valletta was selected through a national final, organised by the Maltese broadcaster Public Broadcasting Services (PBS) on 16 July 2016, while their song was selected internally. Each of the twenty participants performed covers or non-Eurovision candidate songs during the national final. Christina Magrin was declared the winner and her Junior Eurovision song "Parachute" was revealed on 27 October.

== Background ==
Prior to the 2016 Contest, Malta had participated in the Junior Eurovision Song Contest eleven times since its first entry in 2003 only opting not to participate at the 2010, 2011 and 2012 contests. Malta has won on two occasions: in 2013 when Gaia Cauchi won with the song "The Start", and again in 2015 when Destiny Chukunyere came first with "Not My Soul" when it won the contest with 185 points, breaking the previous record held by Spain for the most points ever given to a winner.

== Before Junior Eurovision ==
=== National final ===
The national final took place on 16 July 2016. The national final consisted of twenty competing acts participating in a televised production. Each of the 20 participants sang a song of their own choice. After all of them had performed, the jury and televoting cast their votes – each juror had a 25% weighting in the final result (so 75% overall), with the televoting also having a 25% share. The contestants were ranked from 1–20, with 1 being the best. Christina Magrin was announced as the winner of the national final.

Draw	Artist	Song (Original artist)	Place
1	Ella Mangion	"One Moment in Time" (Whitney Houston)	
2	Mariah-Nicola Vella	"All I Ask" (Adele)	
3	Cledia Micallef	"Bring Him Home" (Colm Wilkinson)	
4	Luana Misfud	"Wrecking Ball" (Miley Cyrus)	
5	Justine Shorfid	"I'd Rather Go Blind" (Etta James)	
6	Dylan Curmi	"See You Again" (Wiz Khalifa featuring Charlie Puth)	
7	Alexia Micallef	"The Silence" (Alexandra Burke)	
8	Francesca Grima	"Titanium" (David Guetta featuring Sia)	
9	Kira Copperstone	"Listen" (Beyoncé)	
10	Lisa-Marie Tabone	"At Last" (Glenn Miller Band)	3
11	Rachel Lowell	"I Surrender" (Celine Dion)	
12	Veronica Rotin	"I Will Always Love You" (Dolly Parton)	
13	Kaylie Magri	"When We Were Young" (Adele)	
14	Fusion	"In Love with a Monster" (Fifth Harmony)	2
15	Francesca Dimech	"Dear Future Husband" (Meghan Trainor)	
16	Christina Magrin	"No More Tears" (Barbra Streisand and Donna Summer)	1
17	Chanelle Zarb	"Hollow" (Tori Kelly)	
18	Miguel Bonello	"Il dolce suono" ("Fifth Element – Diva Dance") (Fanny Tacchinardi Persiani)	
19	Layla Fitouri	"And I Am Telling You" (Jennifer Holliday)	
20	Krista Hill	"Glitter & Gold" (Rebecca Ferguson)	

==== Jury members ====
The jury members were as follows (in alphabetical order):

- Edoardo Grassi – Head of Delegation, France.
- Joana Levieva-Sawyer – Head of Delegation, Bulgaria.
- Nicola Caligiore – Head of Delegation, Italy.

=== Song selection ===
On 27 October 2016, it was revealed that Christina's song for the Junior Eurovision Song Contest 2016 was revealed would be entitled "Parachute". The song, which is composed and written by Florent Boshnjaku and Matt "Muxu" Mercieca, was presented live on TVM news bulletin and it was broadcast simultaneously on tvm.com.mt.

== Artist and song information ==
(Malta) "Parachute"
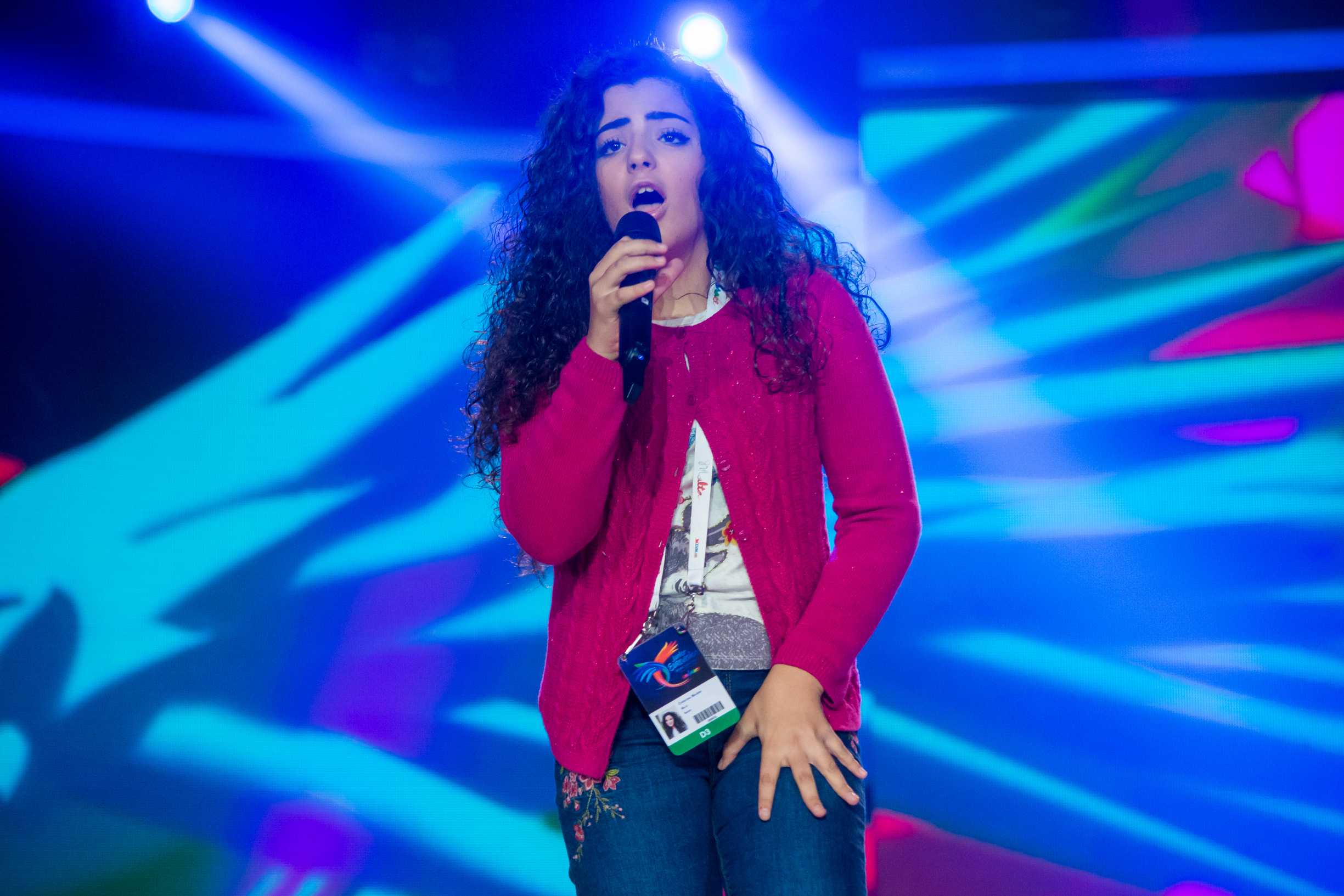

Junior Eurovision Song Contest 2016 entry
- Country: Malta
- Artist: Christina Magrin
- Languages: English
- Composer: Florent Boshnjaku
- Lyricists: Matt "Muxu" Mercieca, Christina Magrin

Finals performance
- Final result: 6th
- Final points: 191

Entry chronology
- ◄ "Not My Soul" (2015)
- "Dawra Tond" (2017) ►

=== Christina Magrin ===
Christina Magrin
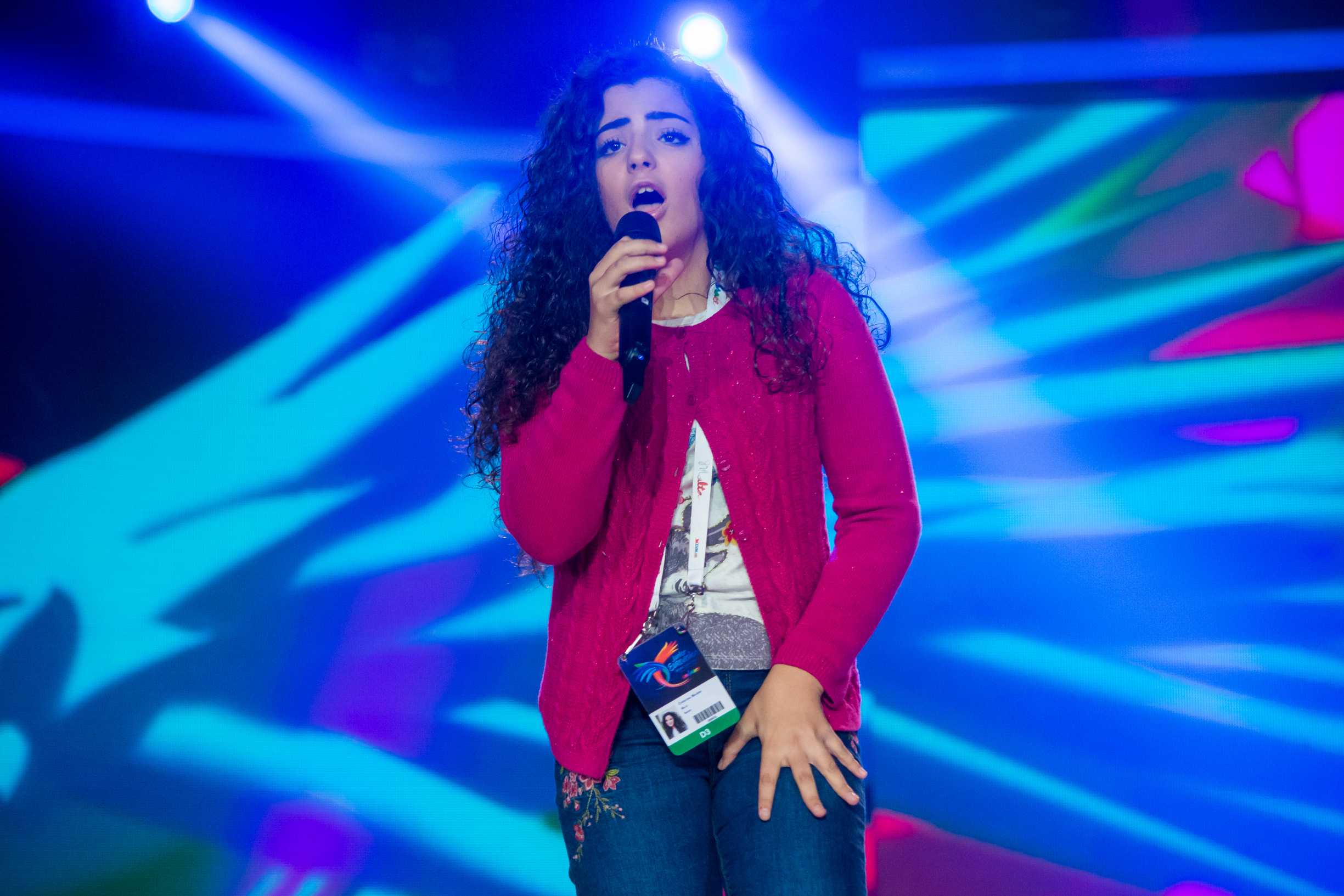

Background information
- Born: 7 June 2003 (age 22)
- Genres: Pop; R&B; Jazz
- Occupation: Singer
- Instrument: Vocals
- Years active: 2013–present

Christina Magrin (born 7 June 2003) is a Maltese singer. She represented Malta at the Junior Eurovision Song Contest 2016 in Valletta, Malta on 20 November 2016 with the song "Parachute". Magrin studies vocal technique under her mother's guidance, who is also a passionate musician and a lecturer by profession. Her first big break was during her rendition of "Suus" (the entry for Albania in the Eurovision Song Contest 2012), where she caught the attention of millions of TV viewers and reached over 400,000 YouTube views in just a few days. The video went viral on Albanian media, capturing the attention of the composer of the song who promised to compose a song and launch it in the Balkans.

Since her childhood years, Magrin dedicated considerable time and energy for ballet, achieving consistent results from the Royal Academy of Dance. She is currently following the Intermediate Foundation syllabus with Joanna Rummolino. For a number of years, she also took piano lessons and obtained various distinction results from the Royal Schools of Music. Magrin distinguishes herself on stage through an impressive vocal range that gives her ample versatility and an ability to sing in multiple languages. Magrin has performed in 10 languages: English, Maltese, Albanian, Serbian, French, Italian, Macedonian, Ukrainian, Spanish and Bulgarian. She has also sat for Grade 8 exams at the Trinity College London, achieving recognition from the college as the youngest student to take the grade and achieving a high mark. She was supported in this endeavour by Rachel Fabri Camilleri.

Magrin's has announced that she is currently working on her debut album, which will contain her new single, "Snow Globe", which she performed during the interval act for Malta's pre-selection of the Eurovision Song Contest 2017.

=== Parachute ===
"Parachute" is a song by Maltese singer Christina Magrin. It represented Malta during the Junior Eurovision Song Contest 2016. The song is composed and written by Florent Boshnjaku and Matt "Muxu" Mercieca.

== At Junior Eurovision ==
During the opening ceremony and the running order draw which took place on 14 November 2016, Malta was drawn to perform fifth on 20 November 2016, following Russia and preceding Bulgaria.

The final was broadcast on the Maltese channel TVM1.

=== Voting ===
During the press conference for the Junior Eurovision Song Contest 2016, held in Stockholm, the Reference Group announced several changes to the voting format for the 2016 contest. Previously, points had been awarded based on a combination of 50% National juries and 50% televoting, with one more set of points also given out by a 'Kids' Jury'. However, this year, points will be awarded based on a 50/50 combination of each country's Adult and Kids' Jury, to be announced by a spokesperson. For the first time since the inauguration of the contest the voting procedure will not include a public televote. Following these results, three expert jurors will also announce their points from 1–8, 10, and 12. These professional jurors are: Christer Björkman, Mads Grimstad, and Jedward.

Points awarded to Malta
Score	Adult and expert juries	Kids juries
12 points	Australia	Albania; Italy
10 points	Cyprus; Italy	Australia; Macedonia; Poland
8 points	Belarus	Russia
7 points	Albania; Georgia	Cyprus
6 points	Macedonia	Armenia
5 points	Bulgaria; Ukraine	Belarus; Bulgaria; Georgia; Ireland
4 points	Armenia; Jedward	Serbia
3 points	Russia	Netherlands; Ukraine
2 points	Mads Grimstad	
1 point	Ireland; Israel; Poland	

Points awarded by Malta
Score	Adult jury	Kids jury
12 points	Ireland	Italy
10 points	Armenia	Ireland
8 points	Australia	Australia
7 points	Netherlands	Armenia
6 points	Bulgaria	Netherlands
5 points	Belarus	Bulgaria
4 points	Albania	Poland
3 points	Georgia	Ukraine
2 points	Macedonia	Russia
1 point	Poland	Macedonia
