= Italy in the Junior Eurovision Song Contest 2015 =

- Junior Eurovision Song Contest 2015
- Country: Italy
- Selection process: Ti lascio una canzone
- Selection date: 19 September 2015

Competing entry
- Song: "Viva"
- Artist: Chiara and Martina

Placement
- Final result: 16th, 34 points

Participation chronology

Italy was represented at the Junior Eurovision Song Contest 2015 in Sofia, Bulgaria after winning in its first appearance in the 2014 contest. They had initially selected their act through the national final Ti lascio una canzone on 12 September 2015, were Chiara and Martina Scarpari had won. However, on 17 September 2015, it was announced that there were technical issues in the voting, and the final would be re-run on 19 September 2015. The Scarpari sisters went on to win the re-run final, and would still represent Italy at the 2015 contest. Italy finished in 16th place during the contest with 34 points.

== Before Junior Eurovision ==
=== Ti lascio una canzone ===
On 24 June 2015, the Italian national broadcast Radiotelevisione italiana (RAI) confirmed Italy's participation at Junior Eurovision Song Contest 2015. It was also announced that the country representative would be select through a national final, to be held during the first episode of the forthcoming edition of Ti lascio una canzone.

==== Final ====
The final took place on 12 September 2015, hosted by Antonella Clerici under the direction of orchestra Maestro Leonardo De Amicis. The singers are all participants from past series of Ti lascio una canzone. The show was articulated in three rounds. In the first round, the participants performed in duels with one another, and the qualifiers were selected by 33% of jury vote, 33% of orchestra vote and 33% of televote. In the second round, the 6 qualifiers sang together a medley consisting of the Italian Eurovision entries "L'essenziale" (2013), "Gente di mare" (1987) and "Nel blu, dipinto di blu" (1958). The 2 superfinalists were selected by 50% jury and 50% televote. In the third round, the winner of the national final was selected by 100% televote. One of the guests during the evening was Martina Stoessel, main character of the Disney Channel TV series Violetta.

Qualifier Wildcard qualifier

Round 1 – 12 September 2015
Duel	Draw	Artist	Song	Percentage	Result
I	1	Rebecca Toschi	"Lontano dagli occhi" (Sergio Endrigo & Mary Hopkin)	40%	Eliminated
I	2	Claudia Ciccateri	"Ti sento" (Matia Bazar)	60%	Advanced
II	3	Beatrice Coltella and Antonio Licari	"Se mi vuoi" (Pino Daniele & Irene Grandi)	51%	Advanced
II	4	Sophia De Rosa and Andrea Ascanio	"Arriverà" (Modà & Emma Marrone)	49%	Eliminated
III	5	Gabriele Acquavia	"Chiamami ancora amore" (Roberto Vecchioni)	41%	Eliminated
III	6	Chiara and Martina Scarpari	"Senza pietà" (Anna Oxa)	59%	Advanced
IV	7	Valentina Baldelli	"Gli uomini non cambiano" (Mia Martini)	55%	Advanced
IV	8	Emanuele Bertelli	"L'immensità" (Don Backy)	45%	Advanced
V	9	Clara Palmeri	"Sally" (Vasco Rossi)	49%	Eliminated
V	10	Giovanni Sutera Sardo	"Feeling Good" (Cy Grant)	51%	Advanced

Round 2 – 12 September 2015
Artist	Result
Beatrice Coltella and Antonio Licari	Eliminated
Chiara and Martina Scarpari	Advanced
Claudia Ciccateri	Eliminated
Emanuele Bertelli	Eliminated
Giovanni Sutera Sardo	Advanced
Valentina Baldelli	Eliminated

Round 3 – 12 September 2015
Draw	Artist	Song	Percentage	Place
1	Chiara and Martina Scarpari	"Una ragione di più" (Ornella Vanoni)	60%	1
2	Giovanni Sutera Sardo	"For Once in My Life" (Frank Sinatra)	40%	2

==== Technical issues and re-run ====
On 17 September 2015, the Italian broadcaster RAI announced that the third round results were cancelled due to technical problems with the televoting. Emanuele Bertelli was announced at the start of the third round as being the superfinalist instead of Giovanni Scutera Sardo. The correction of this error was only made after the Scarpari Sisters had made an exhibition during the televoting. The repetition of the national final's third round was held on 19 September during another episode of Ti lascio una canzone. The winner was decided by televoting only, which closed shortly after both performances, which were a repetition of the performances in the third round of the final. Following a quick commercial break, the show returned to announce Chiara and Martina as the winners with 67.39% of the vote.

== Artist and song information ==
(Italy) "Viva"

Junior Eurovision Song Contest 2015 entry
- Country: Italy
- Artists: Chiara and Martina Scarpari
- Languages: Italian
- Composers: Luigi D'Alessio, Adriano Pennino
- Lyricists: Fabrizio Berlincioni, Chiara Scarpari, Martina Scarpari

Finals performance
- Final result: 16
- Final points: 34

=== Chiara and Martina ===
Born in Reggio Calabria on 22 May 2000, the sisters Chiara and Martina Scarpari showed a natural love of music since their early childhood. Chiara and Martina's singing talent was noticed first by their grandfather, who five years earlier encouraged them to follow their passion. Three years later they met their mentor, Christian Cosentino, who raised the bar even higher and encouraged them to sing and compete on an international level. After the victories in some local contests, in 2014 Chiara and Martina debuted on the Rai1 prime time talent show for teens ‘Ti lascio una canzone.’ After two winning nights, they qualified for the final night and earned third place.

The twins released their first single, ‘Sempre insieme,’ and represented Italy at the New Wave Junior contest, where they were the runners-up, missing victory by only one point. In December 2014 Chiara and Martina were invited to Moscow, where they performed with the renowned Cuban singer Roberto Kel Torres. This year, their success continued; performing again on Rai 1 and being invited back to New Wave Junior 2015 as special guests. They then won the Italian National Final for the Junior Eurovision Song Contest, and are competing with their second single ‘Viva,’ written together with the best-selling artist Gigi D’Alessio.

=== Viva ===
Viva is a song by Italian twin sisters Chiara and Martina Scarpari and it represented Italy in the Junior Eurovision Song Contest 2015 in Sofia, Bulgaria.

== At Junior Eurovision ==
At the running order draw which took place on 15 November 2015, Italy were drawn to perform fourth on 21 November 2015, following Slovenia and preceding Netherlands.

=== Final ===
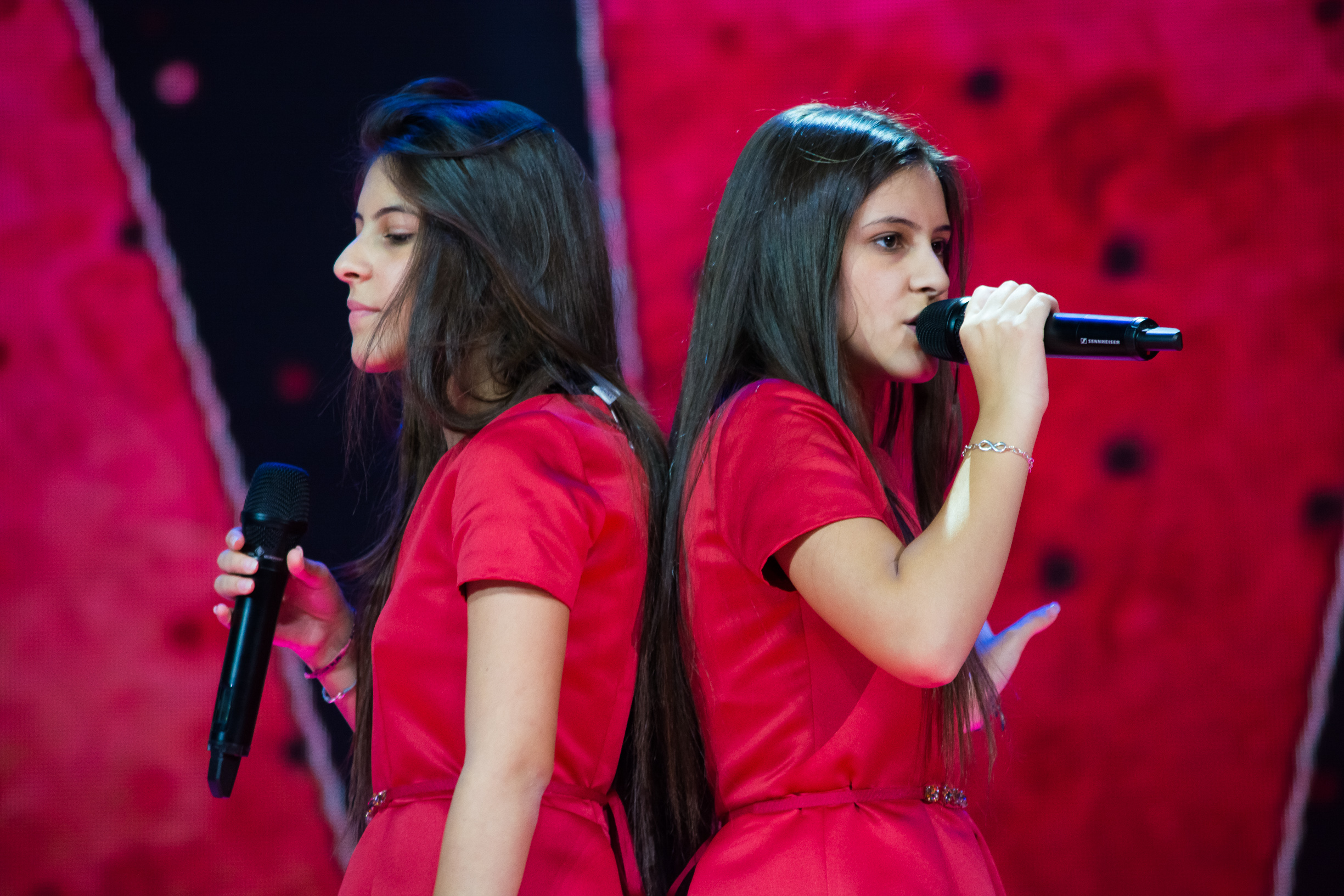
Chiara & Martina at stage of JESC 2015

The twins were dressed in coordinating red knee-length dresses and black boots. Their camera shots certainly highlighted the fact that these sisters are identical twins, but they were certainly allowed to shine on their own in solo shots. A number of sweeping pans of the arena brought a positive energy to the proceedings. At the end of the voting, Italy placed 16th (second-to-last) with 34 points.

=== Voting ===
The voting during the final consisted of 50 percent public televoting and 50 percent from a jury deliberation. The jury consisted of five music industry professionals who were citizens of the country they represent, with their names published before the contest to ensure transparency. This jury was asked to judge each contestant based on: vocal capacity; the stage performance; the song's composition and originality; and the overall impression by the act. In addition, no member of a national jury could be related in any way to any of the competing acts in such a way that they cannot vote impartially and independently. The individual rankings of each jury member were released one month after the final.

Following the release of the full split voting by the EBU after the conclusion of the competition, it was revealed that Italy had placed sixteenth (second-to-last) with the public televote and tenth with the jury vote. In the public vote, Italy scored 13 points, while with the jury vote, Italy scored 43 points. Below is a breakdown of points awarded to Italy and awarded by Italy in the final and the breakdown of the jury voting and televoting conducted during the final.

Points awarded to Italy
Score	Country
12 points (Note: All countries received one set of 12 points to ensure no country finished with nul points.)	Malta
10 points	
8 points	
7 points	
6 points	
5 points	
4 points	Albania
3 points	Armenia
2 points	Serbia
1 point	Montenegro

Points awarded by Italy
Score	Country
12 points	Albania
10 points	Malta
8 points	Bulgaria
7 points	Slovenia
6 points	Armenia
5 points	Ukraine
4 points	Russia
3 points	Australia
2 points	Belarus
1 point	Netherlands

==== Detailed voting results ====
The following members comprised the Italian jury:

- Marida Caterini
- Stefania Zizzari
- Andrea Corba
- Michele Bertocchi
- Carolina Rey

Detailed voting results from Italy
Draw	Country	M. Caterini	S. Zizzari	A. Corba	M. Bertocchi	C. Rey	Average Jury Points	Televoting Points	Points Awarded
01	Serbia	7							
02	Georgia								
03	Slovenia		3	3	3	6	4	7	7
04	Italy								
05	Netherlands		8	5	7	8	6		1
06	Australia	4	5	6	10	5	7		3
07	Ireland	1		1		3		1	
08	Russia		6	8	4	4	5	2	4
09	Macedonia	8			1		1		
10	Belarus	3	1	4	2		2	4	2
11	Armenia	5	10	7	5	7	8	3	6
12	Ukraine	2	4		6	1	3	6	5
13	Bulgaria	6						12	8
14	San Marino		2					5	
15	Malta	12	12	12	12	12	12	8	10
16	Albania	10	7	10	8	10	10	10	12
17	Montenegro			2		2			
