= Belarus in the Junior Eurovision Song Contest 2015 =

- Junior Eurovision Song Contest 2015
- Country: Belarus
- Selection process: National final
- Selection date: 21 August 2015

Competing entry
- Song: "Volshebstvo (Magic)"
- Artist: Ruslan Aslanov
- Songwriters: Vitaliy Kurovskiy; Ruslan Aslanov

Placement
- Final result: 4th, 105 points

Participation chronology

Belarus was represented at the Junior Eurovision Song Contest 2015 with the song "Volshebstvo (Magic)" written by Vitaliy Kurovskiy, Ruslan Aslanov. The song was performed by Ruslan Aslanov. The Belarusian entry for the 2015 contest in Sofia, Bulgaria was selected through a national final organised by the Belarusian broadcaster Belarusian Television and Radio Company (BTRC). The national final consisted of ten competing acts participating in a televised production where the winner was determined by a 50/50 combination of both telephone vote and the votes of jury members made up of music professionals. After winning both the televote and jury vote, Ruslan Aslanov and his song "Volshebstvo" were declared the winners.

== Background ==
Prior to the 2015 Contest, Belarus had participated in the Junior Eurovision Song Contest twelve times since its first entry in 2003. Belarus has won the contest on two occasions: in 2005 with the song "My vmeste" performed by Ksenia Sitnik and in 2007 with the song "S druz'yami performed by Alexey Zhigalkovich. In 2014 Belarus placed 7th out of 16 entries with the song "Sokal" performed by Nadezhda Misyakova.

== Before Junior Eurovision ==
=== National final ===
The final took place on 21 August 2015, hosted by Dmitry Novik and Ilya Volkov. Ruslan Aslanov won both the jury and public vote in Belarus and he was declared the winner of the Belarusian national selection.

Final – 21 August 2015
Draw	Artist	Song	Jury	Televote		Total	Place
1	Elizaveta Kozak & Elena Tovstik	"Pozitivniy mir"	1	2,349	7	8	8
2	Neskuchniy Vozrast	"Dazhe yesli ty ne muzykant"	10	1,334	4	14	2
3	Angelina Vasilevskaya	"Ty pover v mechtu"	2	1,238	3	5	10
4	Maria Novik	"Shag za shagom"	6	2,504	8	14	3
5	Zaranak	"Zhizn' prekrasna"	7	1,031	2	9	7
6	Aleksandr Mahankov	"Samiye krasivie"	4	627	1	5	9
7	Maria Magilinaya	"Taynu priotkryt"	5	2,186	6	11	6
8	Ruslan Aslanov	"Volshebstvo"	12	5,236	12	24	1
9	Elizaveta Muravyeva	"Letucennaya"	3	2,780	10	13	5
10	Zinaida Kupriyanovich	"Mir"	8	1,755	5	13	4

== Artist and song information ==
(Belarus) "Volshebstvo (Magic)"

Junior Eurovision Song Contest 2015 entry
- Country: Belarus
- Artist(s): Ruslan Aslanov
- Languages: Russian, English
- Composer(s): Ruslan Kvinta
- Lyricist(s): Vitaliy Kurovskiy, Ruslan Aslanov

Entry chronology
- ◄ "Sokol" (2014)
- "Muzyka moikh pobed" (2016) ►

=== Ruslan Aslanov ===
Ruslan Aslanov (Belarusian: Руслан Асланаў, Russian: Руслан Асланов) is a child singer who represented Belarus in the Junior Eurovision Song Contest 2015 with his song "Volshebstvo (Magic)". Ruslan ended in 4th place with 105 points.

Thanks to the wisdom of his grandmother, Ruslan has had much success singing and performing. He won first place and accolades in competitions and festivals that include ‘Voice: Ukraine’ and ‘New Wave Russia’. In his free time, Ruslan says that he’s always ready to play tennis and football with friends.

He also likes to help his parents at home and play computer games. He would like to sing along with Christina Aguilera (she is unbelievable) and Bruno Mars (he has a cool voice) and both Teo and Uzari who represented Belarus in the Eurovision Song Contest in 2014 and 2015 respectively. He was also a green room host at the Belarusian national final for Junior Eurovision in 2018.

Ruslan dreams of winning a Grammy award for himself one day.

== At Junior Eurovision ==
At the running order draw which took place on 15 November 2015, Belarus were drawn to perform tenth on 21 November 2015, following Macedonia and preceding Armenia.

=== Final ===
Performing from a small raised platform, Ruslan gave several very emotional and passionate performances. The backdrop for this performance was a tree with changing colours and various effects. With one move of his arm, Ruslan was able to change the background effects through the song, creating his magic on stage. As they key change was coming in, as well as the switching of the song into English, the tree was set alight to bring the final crescendo of song.

At the end of the voting, Belarus placed 4th with 105 points.

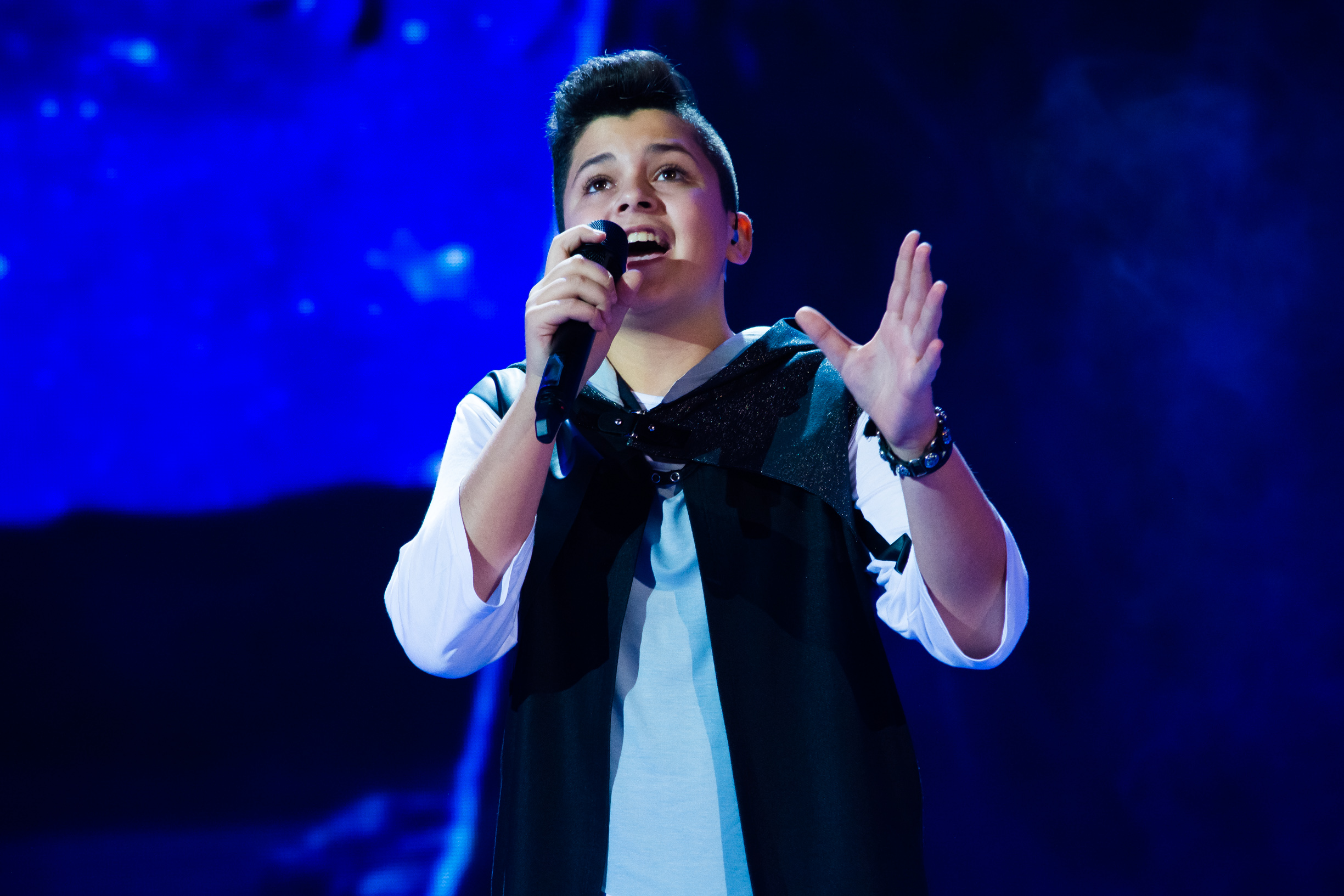
Ruslan Aslanov during a rehearsal at the stage of JESC 2015

=== Voting ===
The voting during the final consisted of 50 percent public televoting and 50 percent from a jury deliberation. The jury consisted of five music industry professionals who were citizens of the country they represent, with their names published before the contest to ensure transparency. This jury was asked to judge each contestant based on: vocal capacity; the stage performance; the song's composition and originality; and the overall impression by the act. In addition, no member of a national jury could be related in any way to any of the competing acts in such a way that they cannot vote impartially and independently. The individual rankings of each jury member were released one month after the final.

Following the release of the full split voting by the EBU after the conclusion of the competition, it was revealed that Belarus had placed seventh with the public televote and third with the jury vote. In the public vote, Belarus scored 61 points, while with the jury vote, Belarus scored 101 points.

Below is a breakdown of points awarded to Belarus and awarded by Belarus in the final and the breakdown of the jury voting and televoting conducted during the final.

Points awarded to Belarus
Score	Country
12 points (Note: All countries received one set of 12 points to ensure no country finished with nul points.)	
10 points	Russia
8 points	Georgia; Kids Jury
7 points	Australia; Ireland; Netherlands; San Marino; Ukraine
6 points	Albania
5 points	Armenia; Serbia
4 points	Macedonia; Malta
3 points	Bulgaria; Slovenia
2 points	Italy
1 point	

Points awarded by Belarus
Score	Country
12 points	Armenia
10 points	Malta
8 points	Slovenia
7 points	Russia
6 points	Ukraine
5 points	Georgia
4 points	Serbia
3 points	San Marino
2 points	Albania
1 point	Australia

==== Detailed voting results ====
The following members comprised the Belarusian jury:

- Iskui Abalyan
- Alena Trashchynskaya
- Tatsiana Siamionava
- Uri Naurotski
- Anatoliy Mukalay

Detailed voting results from Belarus
Draw	Country	I. Abalyan	A. Trashchynskaya	T. Siamionava	U. Naurotski	A. Mukalay	Average Jury Points	Televoting Points	Points Awarded
01	Serbia	5	6	6	4	7	6		4
02	Georgia	8	8	7	8	6	8		5
03	Slovenia	6	10	8	5	8	7	8	8
04	Italy								
05	Netherlands	4	2		6		3		
06	Australia	7	5	5	3	2	4	1	1
07	Ireland							4	
08	Russia	2	1	3		3	1	12	7
09	Macedonia					1			
10	Belarus								
11	Armenia	10	7	10	10	10	10	10	12
12	Ukraine	3	4	4	7	5	5	6	6
13	Bulgaria			1	1			2	
14	San Marino							5	3
15	Malta	12	12	12	12	12	12	7	10
16	Albania		3	2	2	4	2	3	2
17	Montenegro	1							
