= Aimee Banks =

Irish soprano singer (born 2002)

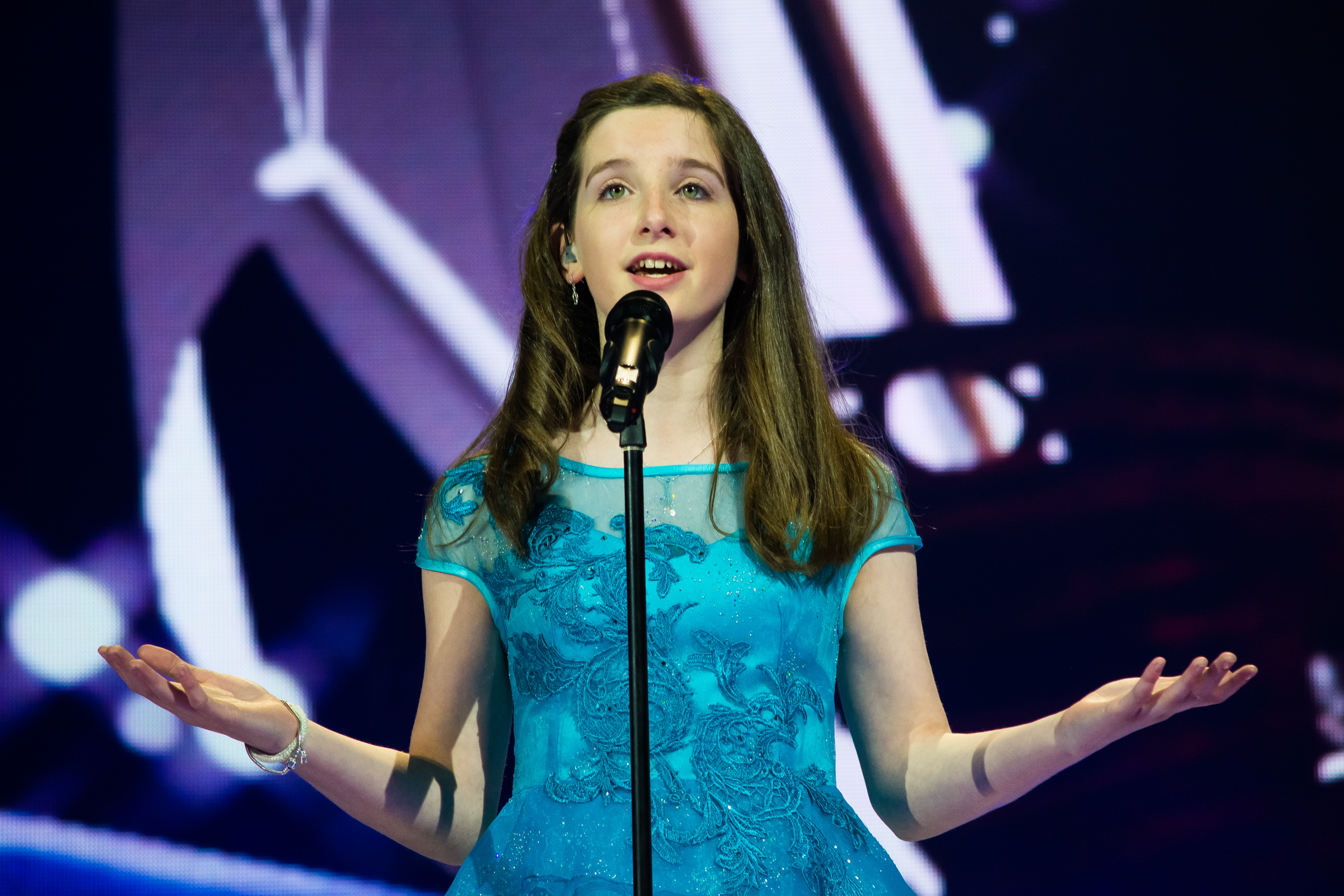
- Banks performing at the Junior Eurovision 2015

Background information
- Born: 14 February 2002 (age 23)
- Origin: Moycullen, County Galway, Ireland
- Occupation: soprano
- Instrument: vocal artist
- Years active: 2015–present

Aimee Banks (born 14 February 2002) is an Irish soprano from Moycullen, in County Galway. She represented Ireland at the 2015 Junior Eurovision Song Contest, singing Réalta na Mara, (lit. Star of the sea), a song which she co-wrote and composed with Niall Mooney, Jonas Gladnikoff and Brendan McCarthy. In 2022, she was awarded the Irené Sandford Award for Singers by the Royal Irish Academy of Music.

After Junior Eurovision, Banks went on to perform at competitions and other events not only in Ireland, but other countries like the United Kingdom and the United States. Banks won the International Vocal Competition "American Protege", and perform at Weill Recital Hall. She secured eight National Titles at Ireland's Classical Festival Feis Ceoil 2015 and was also awarded Overall Vocalist Award and Bursary 2015 for Midlands Feis Ceoil. She had recorded her debut album My Classical Spirit and donated the proceeds to Laura Lynn Children's Hospice. In 2016, to high acclaim she debuted in her first opera as the young Giordano Bruno in Roger Doyle's first electronic opera Heresy.

Awards and achievements
Preceded by none	Ireland in the Junior Eurovision Song Contest; 2015	Succeeded by Zena Donnelly with "Bríce ar bhríce"
