= Unbreakable Smile =

Studio album by Tori Kelly
- Released: June 23, 2015
- Recorded: 2014–2015
- Genres: Pop; R&B
- Length: 49:16
- Labels: Capitol; Schoolboy
- Producers: Max Martin; Tori Kelly; OzGo; Rickard Göransson; Lukas Loules; The Struts; Oscar Holter; Toby Gad; Ed Sheeran; Ilya; Laleh Pourkarim; Malay; Oren Yoel; Johan Carlsson; Chuck Harmony

Tori Kelly chronology
Foreword (2013)	Unbreakable Smile (2015)	Hiding Place (2018)

Singles from Unbreakable Smile
- 1. "Nobody Love" Released: February 8, 2015; 2. "Should've Been Us" Released: June 2, 2015

Alternative cover
- Reissue album cover

Singles from Unbreakable Smile Repack
- 1. "Hollow" Released: October 19, 2015

Unbreakable Smile is the debut studio album by American singer Tori Kelly. It was released on June 23, 2015, through Capitol Records and Schoolboy Records. The album was executively produced by Max Martin. The album received generally positive reviews from critics.

Unbreakable Smile was preceded by two singles, "Nobody Love" and "Should've Been Us". The album debuted at number two on the US Billboard 200. The reissue of the album features two new tracks, "Hollow" and "Something Beautiful", and an alternate album cover was released on January 29, 2016.

== Release and promotion ==
In April 2015, Kelly announced a North American tour, which is called the Where I Belong Tour which took place through May and June to support Unbreakable Smile. Kelly performed her single "Should've Been Us" along with an interview on Good Morning America on June 22, 2015, the day before the album's release.

"Nobody Love" was released as the album's lead single on February 8, 2015. "Unbreakable Smile" was officially released on April 27, 2015 as the album's first promotional single. "Should've Been Us" was initially made available as a promotional single along with the album's pre-order on May 12, 2015. Later, it was released to Top 40 radio as the album's second single on June 2, 2015.

"Hollow" was released digitally on October 19, 2015, and released in North America on October 22, 2015, as the third single from the album, and the first from the reissue and was released to Top 40 radio on November 3, 2015.

All of the aforementioned tracks received music videos.

== Critical reception ==
Professional ratings
Review scores
Source	Rating
AllMusic	4/5 stars
Rolling Stone	2.5/5 stars

Empty Lighthouse Magazine called the album Kelly's "break into the industry" with applaud to her songwriting and vocals. Music Snake wrote that the album was an "impressive debut" with Kelly being "boldly authentic and effortlessly talented." In a review from Trendio, the album was called "timeless" and lived up to expectations. However, it was said that Kelly should have broken out of her comfort zone a little more. Matthew Scott Donnelly from PopCrush rated the album 3 out of 5. He wrote that the first half of the album surpassed the second half and closed with "Kelly’s got pipes that could stop an Olympic sprinter in her tracks—and she’s got a great album in her—but Unbreakable Smile, for its undeniable glint, could do with a bit of elective orthodontia." AndPop's Merna Jibrail complimented the album's variety although she noted the lack of singles that could have potentially built more momentum and promotion for the album.

== Commercial performance ==
The album was predicted to sell 65,000 units in its first week and debut in the top five of the US Billboard 200. The album debuted at number two on the Billboard 200, with 75,000 album-equivalent units, including 65,000 pure album sales.

== Reissue ==
The album was re-released on January 29, 2016. "Hollow" was released on October 22, 2015, as the first single from the new edition of the album. In addition to the standard reissue of the album, an exclusive version of the re-release was made available at Target stores. In addition to the two new tracks, it retains the two additional bonus tracks from the original exclusive version of the album. The iTunes bonus tracks were included on the reissue of the album on iTunes everywhere except North America.

== Track listing ==
Unbreakable Smile track listing
No.	Title	Writer(s)	Producer(s)	Length
1.	"Where I Belong" (Intro)	Tori Kelly; Claude Kelly	T. Kelly	1:27
2.	"Unbreakable Smile"	T. Kelly	OzGo	3:48
3.	"Nobody Love"	T. Kelly; Rickard Göransson; Savan Kotecha; Max Martin	Martin; Göransson	3:23
4.	"Expensive" (featuring Daye Jack)	T. Kelly; Kotecha; Alexander Kronlund; Joleen Belle; Lukas Loules; Tash; Daye Jack	Martin; Lulou	3:27
5.	"Should've Been Us"	T. Kelly; Ludvig Söderberg; Jakob Jerlström; Oscar Holter; Laleh Pourkarim; Alexander Kronlund; James Alan	The Struts; Holter	3:06
6.	"First Heartbreak"	T. Kelly; Toby Gad	Gad	3:24
7.	"I Was Made for Loving You" (featuring Ed Sheeran)	T. Kelly; Sheeran	T. Kelly; Sheeran	3:08
8.	"City Dove"	T. Kelly; Sheeran; Ilya Salmanzadeh; Pourkarim	Ilya; Pourkarim	3:42
9.	"Talk"	T. Kelly; James Ryan Ho	Malay	3:52
10.	"Funny" (Live)	T. Kelly; C. Kelly; Charles Harmon	T. Kelly	4:17
11.	"Art of Letting You Go"	T. Kelly; Oren Yoel	Yoel	3:36
12.	"California Lovers" (featuring LL Cool J)	T. Kelly; Martin; Kotecha; Göransson; Ali Payami; James Todd Smith	Martin; Payami	3:40
13.	"Falling Slow"	T. Kelly; Johan Carlsson; Martin	Carlsson	3:54
14.	"Anyway"	T. Kelly; C. Kelly; Harmon	Chuck Harmony	4:32
Total length:				49:16

iTunes Store bonus tracks
No.	Title	Writer(s)	Producer(s)	Length
15.	"Dear No One"	T. Kelly	T. Kelly	3:19
16.	"Beautiful Things"	T. Kelly; Harmon	T. Kelly; Harmon	3:08
Total length:				55:43

UK iTunes Store deluxe edition
No.	Title	Writer(s)	Producer(s)	Length
17.	"Lullaby" (Professor Green featuring Tori Kelly)	Stephen Manderson; Chris Crowhurst; Ina Wroldsen	Chris Loco	4:53
Total length:				60:36

Target bonus tracks
No.	Title	Writer(s)	Producer(s)	Length
15.	"Bottled Up"	T. Kelly; Jenna Andrews	Chuck Harmony	4:06
16.	"Personal"	T. Kelly; Harmon; C. Kelly	Chuck Harmony	4:06
Total length:				57:28

Reissue bonus tracks
No.	Title	Writer(s)	Producer(s)	Length
15.	"Hollow"	T. Kelly; Hayley Warner; Zac Poor; Lindsey Jackson; Thom Macken	Adam Anders; Peer Åström	3:30
16.	"Something Beautiful"	T. Kelly; Justin Franks; Jacob Luttrell; Jeanette Steiner	DJ Frank E; Jimmy Gonzalez	3:44
Total length:				56:30

Notes

- The Target bonus tracks are also featured on the reissue as tracks 17 and 18.
- The iTunes bonus tracks are also featured as tracks 15 and 16 (UK iTunes bonus track on track 17) before the reissue bonus tracks everywhere except North America.

== Charts ==
=== Weekly charts ===
Weekly chart performance for Unbreakable Smile
Chart (2015)	Peak position
Australian Albums (ARIA)	8
Belgian Albums (Ultratop Flanders)	110
Canadian Albums (Billboard)	3
Dutch Albums (Album Top 100)	75
Irish Albums (IRMA)	94
New Zealand Albums (RMNZ)	6
Scottish Albums (Official Charts)	52
UK Albums (Official Charts)	36
US Billboard 200	2

=== Year-end charts ===
Year-end chart performance for Unbreakable Smile
Chart (2015)	Position
US Billboard 200	132

== Certifications ==
Certifications for Unbreakable Smile
Region	Certification	Certified units/sales
Australia (ARIA)	Platinum	70,000^{^}
United States (RIAA)	Gold	500,000^{‡}
^{^} Shipments figures based on certification alone.^{‡} Sales+streaming figures based on certification alone.

== Release history ==
Unbreakable Smile release history
Region	Date	Format	Edition	Label	Ref.
Australia	June 23, 2015	Digital download	Deluxe	Capitol; School Boy	
United States	June 23, 2015	CD; digital download	Standard; deluxe	Capitol; School Boy	
South Africa	June 23, 2015	CD; digital download	Standard; deluxe	Capitol; School Boy	
Sweden	June 23, 2015	CD; digital download	Standard	Capitol; School Boy	
Japan	June 23, 2015	Digital download	Deluxe	Capitol; School Boy	
Australia	June 26, 2015	CD	Standard	Capitol; School Boy	
United Kingdom	October 16, 2015	CD; Digital download	Standard; deluxe	Capitol; School Boy	
Worldwide	January 23, 2016	CD; Digital download	Reissue	Capitol; School Boy	
