= Thirdstory =

American band

Thirdstory is an American band from New York City consisting of singer-songwriters Elliott Skinner, Ben Lusher, and Rich Saunders.

== History ==
Thirdstory formed in New York City in early 2014. The Trio is signed to Verve Records a record label under Universal Music Group.

The band opened for Tori Kelly on the Unbreakable Tour in spring 2016, and released their debut EP, Searching, on May 6, 2016. This was followed by a single, “G Train” featuring Pusha T released in November 2016. In 2017, they performed with Chance the Rapper on the Be Encouraged Tour as members of his band.

On January 31, 2018, Thirdstory announced their debut album, Cold Heart, to be released on March 9, 2018. The album includes the single "G Train" and other songs from the "Searching" EP.

=== Official disbandment ===
On February 12, 2019, the band announced on Instagram that their members will be taking separate paths in their careers.

"After five years of singing, writing, arranging, playing, touring, and practically living together, we’ve officially decided to take time apart to work on new projects and new endeavors. We’re incredibly excited to share lots of fresh music with you this year - Elliott and Ben are working on their own solo projects, and Richard is continuing to release music with Refs. Can’t wait for you all to join us in this new chapter, and hear the individual pieces that have made Thirdstory tick all these years."

=== Current status ===
Their social media handles remained somewhat active, posting updates on the respective member's activities in their own music careers after the disbandment.

They were featured in two tracks on Peter CottonTale's album "CATCH", released in April 2020. They had posted in 2018 concerning the album, before they disbanded.

== Discography ==
=== Albums ===
- "Cold Heart"

=== EPs ===
- Searching

=== Singles ===
- "Jam in the Van (Live)"
- "Hit The Ceiling"
- "Still In Love"
- "Still In Love (Acoustic) ft. Eryn Allen Kane"
- "G Train" ft. Pusha T
