= Not My Soul =

2015 song by Destiny Chukunyere

Single by Destiny Chukunyere
- Released: 26 October 2015
- Recorded: 2015
- Genre: Pop; R&B; soul; funk
- Length: 3:15
- Songwriter(s): Destiny Chukunyere; Matt Mercieca; Elton Zarb
- Producer(s): Chukunyere; Elton Zarb

Destiny Chukunyere singles chronology
"Think" (2015)	"Not My Soul" (2015)

Junior Eurovision Song Contest 2015 entry
- Country: Malta
- Artist(s): Destiny Chukunyere
- Language: English

Finals performance
- Final result: 1st
- Final points: 185

Entry chronology
- ◄ "Diamonds" (2014)
- "Parachute" (2016) ►

"Not My Soul" is a song by Maltese singer Destiny Chukunyere. It represented Malta and was the winning song at the Junior Eurovision Song Contest 2015 in Sofia, Bulgaria.

== Music video ==
The music video was released on 26 October 2015. It features Chukunyere performing the song amongst colourful backdrops.
