= Ireland in the Junior Eurovision Song Contest =

- Junior Eurovision Song Contest
- Participating broadcaster: TG4

Participation summary
- Appearances: 11
- First appearance: 2015
- Highest placement: 4th: 2022
- Participation history: 2015; 2016; 2017; 2018; 2019; 2020; 2021; 2022; 2023; 2024; 2025; 2026
- For the most recent participation see Ireland in the Junior Eurovision Song Contest 2026

Ireland has been represented at the Junior Eurovision Song Contest eleven times since its first appearance at the 2015 contest. The Irish participating broadcaster in the contest is Irish-language TG4. It organises a televised national final Junior Eurovision Éire to select its entries. TG4 did not participate in 2020 due to the COVID-19 pandemic, but returned to the contest in 2021.

Since its debut, it has placed in the top 10 twice: in 2016 when the song "Bríce ar bhríce" performed by Zena Donnelly placed 10th out of 17 participating countries, and in 2022 when "Solas" by Sophie Lennon placed 4th out of 16 participants.

== History ==
TG4 originally intended to make their debut in the 2014 contest in Marsa, Malta, but required funding from the Broadcasting Authority of Ireland, which was rejected.

Ireland debuted in the contest when TG4 participated in the 2015 contest in Sofia, Bulgaria, when the song "Réalta na mara" performed by Aimee Banks placed 12th in a field of 17 countries.

Despite having initially confirmed their participation in the 2020 contest in Warsaw, Poland in January 2020, TG4 announced in August 2020 that they would not participate in the contest due to the COVID-19 pandemic. In February 2021, TG4 confirmed their participation in the 2021 contest in France.

In 2022, Ireland achieved its best result in the contest, when Sophie Lennon finished in fourth place with the power ballad "Solas". However, the following year in 2023, in a reversal of fortunes, Ireland achieved last place for the first time in its participation. This was repeated two years later in 2025.

=== Junior Eurovision Éire ===
Junior Eurovision Éire is an Irish television show which has served as Ireland's national final for the Junior Eurovision Song Contest since the country's debut in 2015. The show was hosted by Eoghan McDermott from 2015 to 2019. Between 2015 and 2018, the show selected both the song and the artist, while starting in 2019, the show selected only the artist, and the song was selected internally.

McDermott stepped down from the programme in 2021, and was replaced by Louise Cantillon.

== Participation overview ==
Table key
◁	Last place

Year	Artist	Song	Language	Place	Points
2015	Aimee Banks	"Réalta na mara"	Irish	12	36
2016	Zena Donnelly	"Bríce ar bhríce"	Irish, English	10	122
2017	Muireann McDonnell	"Súile glasa"	Irish	15	54
2018	Taylor Hynes	"IOU"	Irish	15	48
2019	Anna Kearney	"Banshee"	Irish	12	73
2021	Maiú Levi Lawlor	"Saor (Disappear)"	Irish	18	44
2022	Sophie Lennon	"Solas"	Irish	4	150
2023	Jessica McKean	"Aisling"	Irish	16 ◁	42
2024	Enya Cox Dempsey	"Le chéile"	Irish	15	55
2025	Lottie O'Driscoll Murray	"Rúin"	Irish	18 ◁	44
2026	Caleb Kirwan and Naomi Gribben	"Níos láidre"	Irish	14	64

== Commentators and spokespersons ==
The contests are broadcast online worldwide through the official Junior Eurovision Song Contest website junioreurovision.tv and YouTube. In 2015, the online broadcasts featured commentary in English by junioreurovision.tv editor Luke Fisher and 2011 Bulgarian Junior Eurovision Song Contest entrant Ivan Ivanov. The Irish broadcaster, TG4, sent their own commentators to the contest in order to provide commentary in the Irish language. Spokespersons were also chosen by the national broadcaster in order to announce the awarding points from Ireland. The table below list the details of each commentator and spokesperson since 2015.

Year(s)	Commentator	Spokesperson	Ref.
2015	Stiofán Ó Fearail and Caitlín Nic Aoidh	Anna Banks	
2016	Eoghan McDermott	Andrea Leddy	
2017	Eoghan McDermott	Walter McCabe	
2018	Mícheál Ó Ciaraidh and Sinéad Ní Uallacháin	Alex Hynes	
2019	Sinéad Ní Uallacháin	Leo Kearney	
2020	No broadcast	Did not participate	N/A
2021	Louise Cantillon	Reuben Levi Hackett	
2022	Sinéad Ní Uallacháin	Holly Lennon	
2023	Sinéad Ní Uallacháin	Louisa McKean	
2024	Louise Cantillon	Unknown	
2025	Louise Cantillon	Eoin Murphy	
2026	Louise Cantillon	Dory Hudson	

== Gallery ==
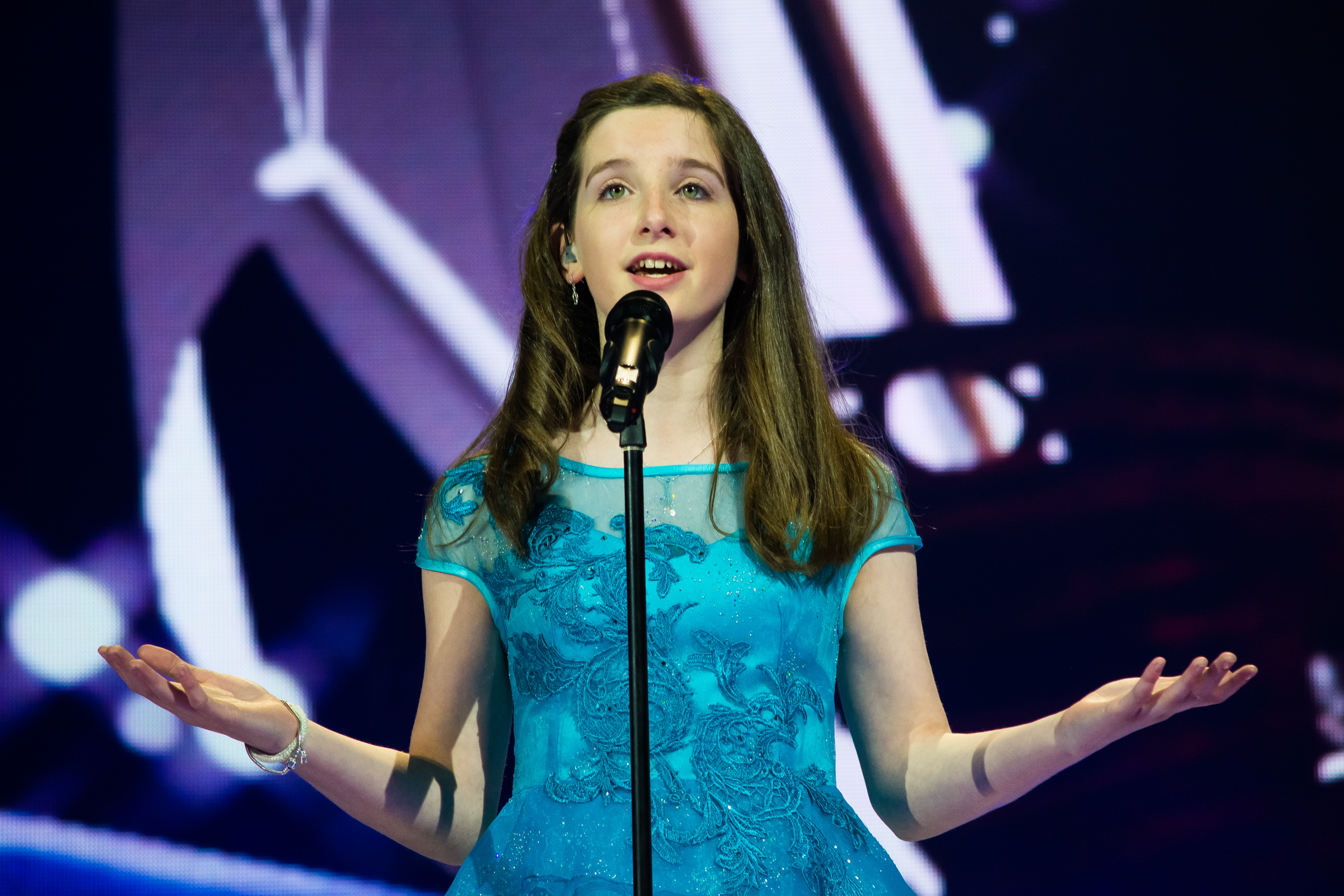
Aimee Banks during the rehearsals in Sofia (2015)

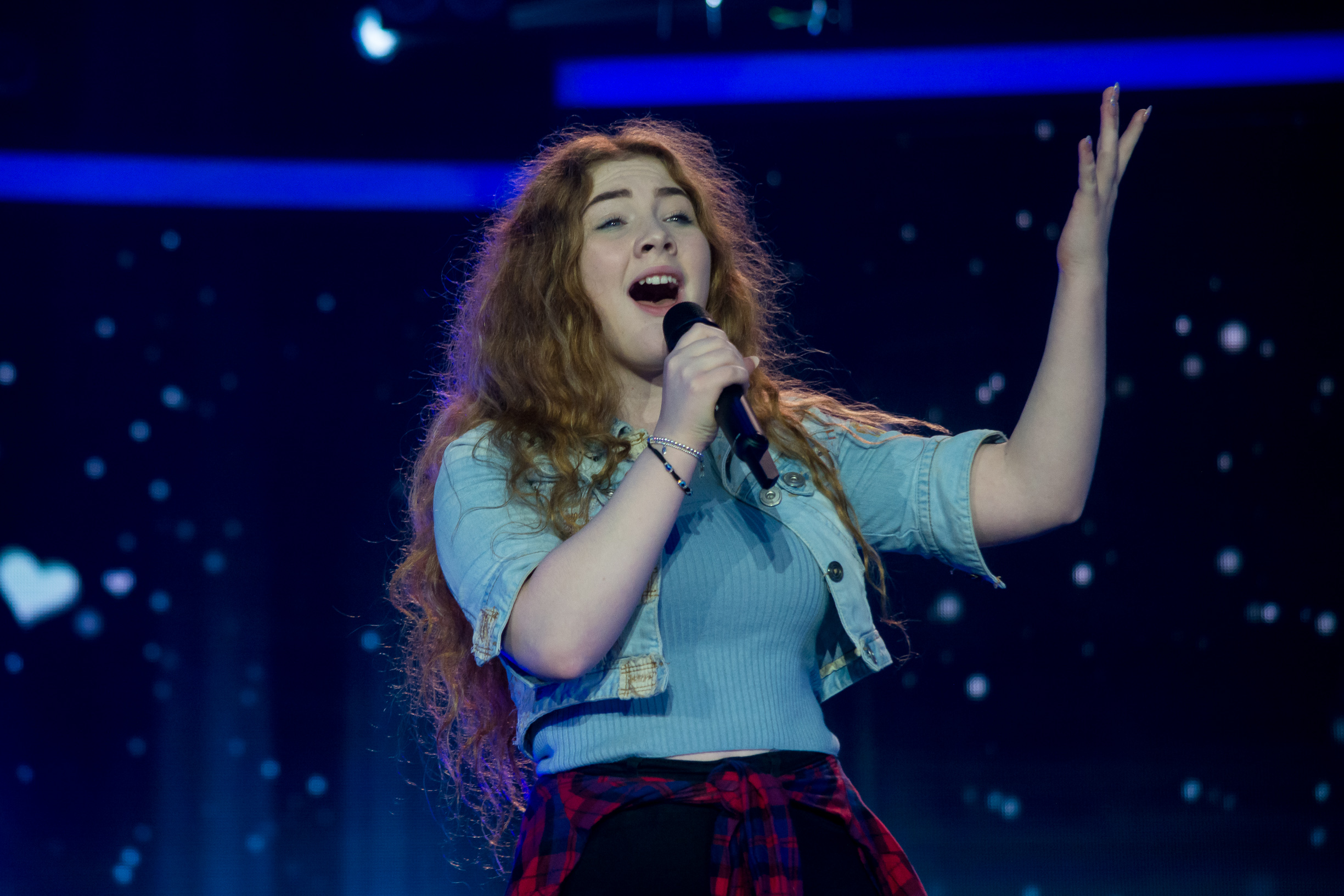
Zena Donnelly during the rehearsals in Valletta (2016)

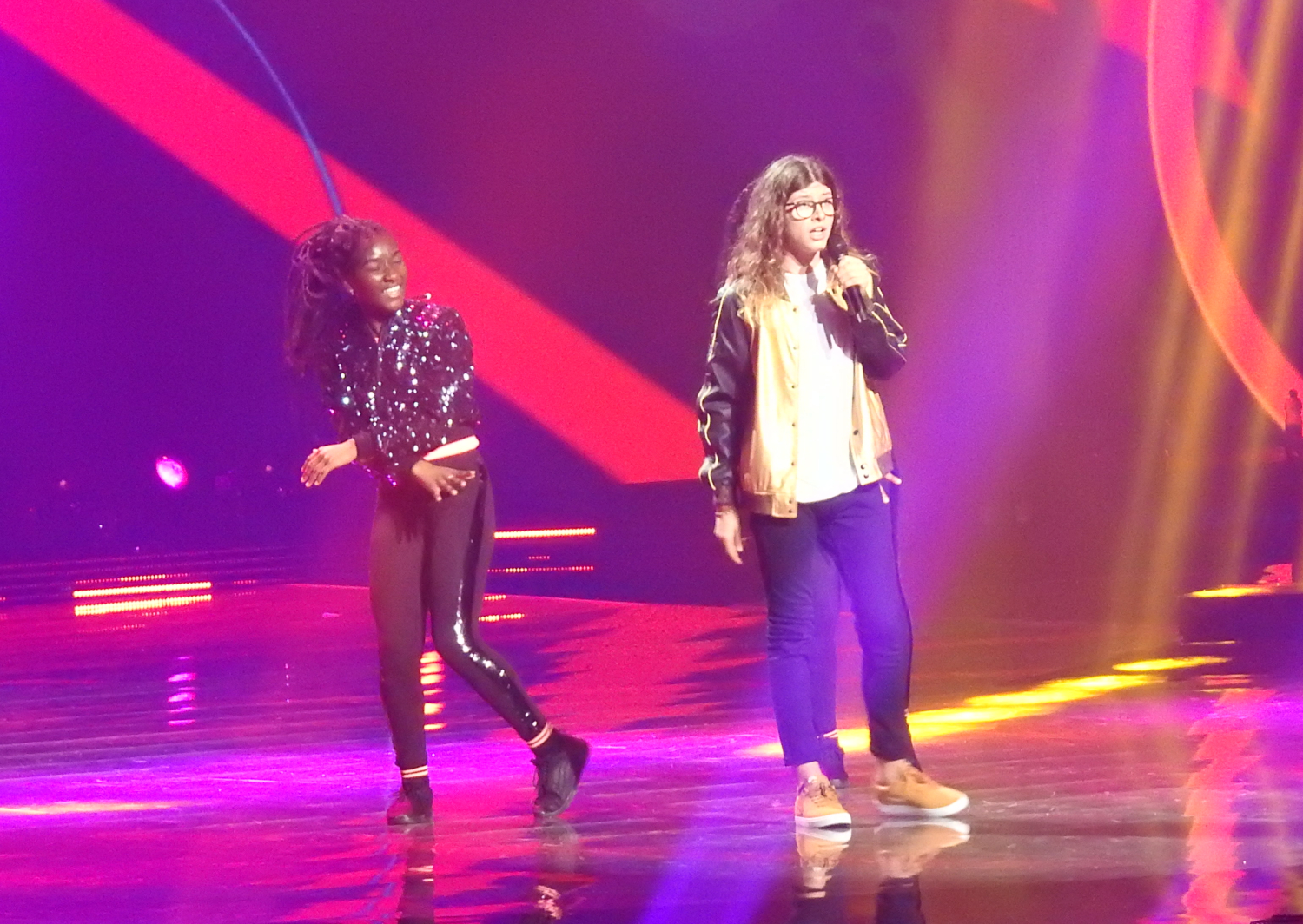
Taylor Hynes during the rehearsals in Minsk (2018)

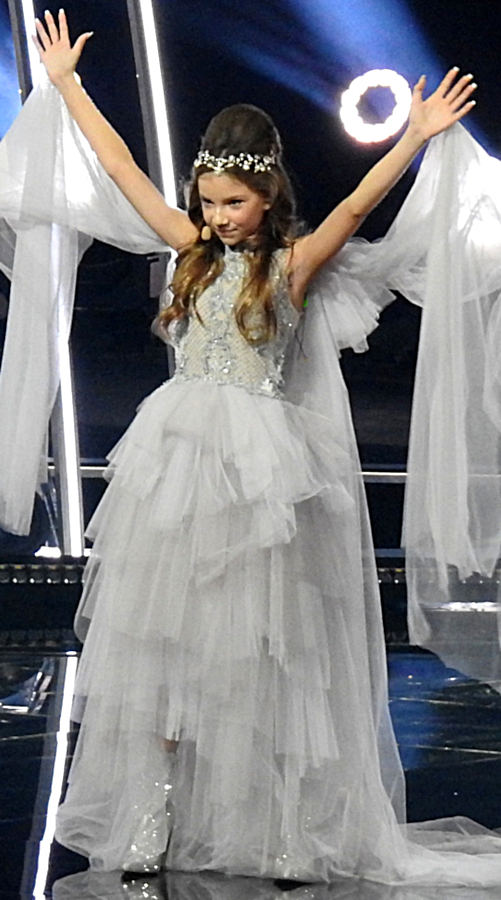
Anna Kearney during the rehearsals in Gliwice (2019)

== See also ==
- Ireland in the Eurovision Song Contest
