= Hollow (Tori Kelly song) =

Single by Tori Kelly

from the album Unbreakable Smile
- Released: 19 October 2015
- Genre: Pop; Christian; balladry
- Length: 3:30
- Label: Capitol; School Boy
- Songwriters: Tori Kelly; Hayley Warner; Zac Poor; Lindsey Jackson; Thom Macken
- Producers: Adam Anders; Peer Åström; Francesco Puks

Tori Kelly singles chronology
"Should've Been Us" (2015)	"Hollow" (2015)	"I'll Find You" (2017)

Music video
- "Hollow" on YouTube

"Hollow" is a song recorded by the American singer and songwriter Tori Kelly for the reissue of her first studio album, Unbreakable Smile (2015). It was first released to digital retailers on 19 October 2015 as the album's third official single before impacting American contemporary hit radio on 3 November 2015, and as the lead single from the reissue. Cowritten by Kelly with the singer-songwriters Hayley Warner, Zac Poor, Lindsey Jackson, and Thom Macken, the song was produced by Adam Anders and Peer Åström. "Hollow" has been certified Platinum in Kelly's home country.

A midtempo ballad, "Hollow" has fluttering synthesizers and piano as well as drum and hand-clap percussion in its instrumentation. Lyrically, the song addresses Kelly's faith and has been described as a "love song to God". It received a positive response from music critics, who praised the song's uplifting message and Kelly's strong vocals. The accompanying music video for the song was released on 5 November 2015 and it shows Kelly performing the track in an abandoned house.

== Background and release ==
While promoting her first album and after the moderate impact of the previous singles, "Nobody Love" and Should've Been Us", Kelly wanted to release another single. When she heard a song called "Hollow" it was not fully finished, so she went to the studio the same night and finished the song. On 14 October 2015, she announced on her Twitter account that she was going to release a new song called "Hollow" the following week. Two days later, she teased the song on Twitter once more, with eleven seconds of the track. It was initially released as a digital download in Europe on 19 October 2015, before being released in North America on 22 October 2015. An official remix featuring the American hip hop artist Big Sean was released to digital retailers on 29 October 2015. Big Sean provides an additional half-sung, half-rapped verse towards the end of the song, replacing an iteration of the chorus from the solo version. "Hollow" was serviced to contemporary hit radio on 3 November 2015. It was later confirmed that the song was going to be included on the reissue of Unbreakable Smile as its lead-single (and third overall).

== Composition and lyrics ==
"For anyone to admit that they’re weak and that they need love and they need that space to be filled, I think that alone is such a vulnerable thing to admit that. We all kind of want to let people know that we’re strong and that we can do everything, and the reality is that we are weak sometimes."

— Kelly about the song's message.

"Hollow" was written by Kelly with the singer-songwriters Hayley Warner, Zac Poor, Lindsey Jackson and Thom Macken, with production by Adam Anders and Peer Åström. It has a duration of three minutes and thirty seconds. The song is a midtempo sentimental pop ballad that incorporates synthesizers, piano and drums in its instrumentation. The song begins with synthesizers and piano "fluttering" in the background, emphasizing Kelly's vocals, before building to a more bombastic production style with the inclusion of the drum and hand-clap percussion. According to the sheet music published at Musicnotes.com by Alfred Publishing Company Inc., the song is written in the key of D minor, with a tempo of 126 beats per minute. Kelly's vocal range spans from the low note of F3 to the high note of a G5 belt and an A5 in head voice. Lyrically, the song describes a hollow life becoming filled with love, which Kelly attributes to her faith, describing "Hollow" as her "love song to God". Kelly described the song as "honest", "vulnerable" and "epic". In the chorus she sings, "I'm fragile and you know this/ So hold me, wrap me in love/ Fill up my cup/ Empty, and only your love could fill up my cup/ Because I'm hollow."

== Critical reception ==
The song received generally positive reviews from contemporary music critics. Robbie Daw of Idolator called it "a big pop anthem", noting, "By the time the second chorus rolls around, it’s pretty clear that the 22 year old and all involved mean business with 'Hollow'." Christina Garibaldi of MTV News praised the fact that the song "once again shows off Tori’s impressive vocals as she smoothly navigates the heavy lyrics over a slow piano". Garibaldi also praised the incorporation of drums and the intense foot-stomp "that not only elevates the music, but heightens the emotion". Carolyn Menyes of Music Times was positive, noting that "Kelly's always-strong vocals are the main power behind the track, just dripping with vulnerability. As the song builds, snaps, drums and electronic instruments are added to the mix, giving 'Hollow' a filling build, which swells alongside Kelly." While noting that the song "sounds like an emotional entry from her diary", Scott Shetler of AXS named it "personal and universal, which should help it connect with listeners".

== Music video ==
The official music video for "Hollow" was directed by Dano Cerny and was premiered on 5 November 2015. Influenced by the song's single cover, the video shows Kelly wandering through an abandoned house.

== Track listing ==
Digital download – single

1. "Hollow" – 3:30

Digital download – Remix single

1. "Hollow (featuring Big Sean)" – 3:30

== Live performances ==
Kelly performed a gospel music-influenced rendition of the song on The Ellen DeGeneres Show on 2 December 2015. Jeffery Austin covered the song on The Voice with Tori Kelly. In the 14th series of the X Factor in the UK, Holly Tandy performed it in the first live show with the theme being "Express Yourself".

== Use in media ==
- The song was used in a commercial for the 2017 Kia Forte.

== Charts ==
=== Weekly charts ===
Chart (2015–2016)	Peak position
Canada Hot 100 (Billboard)	87
Canada CHR/Top 40 (Billboard)	48
Czech Republic Singles Digital (ČNS IFPI)	45
Slovakia Singles Digital (ČNS IFPI)	52
US Billboard Hot 100	68
US Dance Club Songs (Billboard)	3
US Dance/Mix Show Airplay (Billboard)	37
US Pop Airplay (Billboard)	22
US Rhythmic Airplay (Billboard)	27

=== Year-end charts ===
Chart (2016)	Position
US Dance Club Songs (Billboard)	25

== Certifications ==
Region	Certification	Certified units/sales
United States (RIAA)	Platinum	1,000,000^{‡}
^{‡} Sales+streaming figures based on certification alone.

== Release history ==
List of releases, showing the region, release date, format, and record label
Country	Date	Format	Label	Ref.
Europe	19 October 2015	Digital download	Capitol Records; School Boy Records	
Oceania	19 October 2015	Digital download	Capitol Records; School Boy Records	
North America	22 October 2015	Digital download	Capitol Records; School Boy Records	
Europe	29 October 2015	Digital download – Big Sean remix	Capitol Records; School Boy Records	
Oceania	29 October 2015	Digital download – Big Sean remix	Capitol Records; School Boy Records	
United Kingdom	29 October 2015	Digital download – Big Sean remix	Capitol Records; School Boy Records	
North America	2 November 2015	Digital download – Big Sean remix	Capitol Records; School Boy Records	
United States	November 3, 2015	Contemporary hit radio	Capitol Records	
United States	25 January 2016	Hot/Modern/ AC radio	Capitol Records	
