= Zac Poor =

- Born: Zachary Scott Poor
- Genres: Pop, Adult Contemporary, Pop rock
- Occupation: Singer-songwriter
- Website: zacpoor.com

Zachary Scott Poor is an American singer-songwriter based in Los Angeles, California who first appeared on the music scene in early 2010 with his EP, "Let's Just Call it Heartbreak", a collaboration with Glee producer Adam Anders. Universal Motown executive Sylvia Rhone took notice of Poor's talent and signed him to his first major label deal in early 2011. Rhone stepped down as President of Motown within months of signing Poor amidst a shakeup at the label. He and Universal parted ways shortly thereafter.

Zac Poor's writing career includes collaborations with Carl Falk (One Direction, Britney Spears), Brian Kennedy (Chris Brown, Rihanna, Rascal Flatts), Jason Derulo, Nick Jonas, The Backstreet Boys, Howie Dorough, Delta Goodrem, Samantha Jade, The Jonas Brothers, Girls' Generation, and several others.

He began work on his debut LP in late 2012 and collaborated on several of the album's tracks with up and coming producer Mason Levy (MdL) (Justin Bieber, Maroon 5, Mike Posner). Poor is set to release the MdL produced EP titled, "The Crossroads Sessions" on December 4, 2015.

Poor has most recently been listed as a writer on several tracks on Australian Pop Star Samantha Jade's November 2015 debut LP, NINE, "HOLLOW" by Tori Kelly, the double platinum "Los Que Vivimos" by David Bisbal, and "Burn The Bright Lights" by The Collective.

== Personal life ==
Poor was raised in Fairfield, Montana and moved to Los Angeles following high school to pursue a career in music.
