= Nobody Love =

2015 single by Tori Kelly

Single by Tori Kelly

from the album Unbreakable Smile
- Released: February 8, 2015
- Recorded: 2014
- Genre: R&B
- Length: 3:23
- Label: Capitol
- Songwriters: Tori Kelly; Max Martin; Savan Kotecha; Jake C. Lewis; Rickard Göransson
- Producers: Max Martin; Rickard Göransson

Tori Kelly singles chronology
"Lullaby" (2014)	"Nobody Love" (2015)	"Should've Been Us" (2015)

Music video
- "Nobody Love" on YouTube

"Nobody Love" is a song by American singer Tori Kelly. The track was released as the lead single from her debut studio album, Unbreakable Smile, on February 8, 2015. The song was written by Kelly, Max Martin, Rickard Göransson, and Savan Kotecha, and was produced by Martin and Göransson. It was Kelly's first entry on the US Billboard Hot 100 peaking at number 60. It also reached the top 10 in New Zealand and was certified Platinum in the country, along with reaching mainstream success in Australia and Canada.

== Background and release ==
"Nobody Love" was released for retail via digital distribution, on February 8, 2015. The lyric video for the song was also uploaded to YouTube and VEVO, one day after the release.

== Music video ==
The song's accompanying music video premiered on February 26, 2015, on Tori's Vevo account on YouTube. Since its release, the video has received over 21 million views. The music video was directed by Ryan Pallotta.

== Track listing ==
- Digital download
1. "Nobody Love" – 3:23

== Covers and use in media ==
Kelly Clarkson covered the song as part of her "Fan Requests" on opening night of her Piece by Piece Tour. Kelly was flattered that Clarkson covered her song and also thanked Clarkson "for the shoutout & being such a real artist".

"Nobody Love" was used in episodes of Catfish: The TV Show and Love and Hip Hop: Hollywood.

Girl Spirit contestant Bae Sungyeon from Pledis Entertainment trainee group Pledis Girlz sang a cover of this song.

== Charts ==
Chart (2015)	Peak position
Australia (ARIA)	21
Canada Hot 100 (Billboard)	36
Canada CHR/Top 40 (Billboard)	27
Canada Hot AC (Billboard)	36
New Zealand (Recorded Music NZ)	5
US Billboard Hot 100	60
US Adult Pop Airplay (Billboard)	35
US Dance Airplay (Billboard)	39
US Dance Club Songs (Billboard)	48
US Pop Airplay (Billboard)	16

== Certifications ==
Region	Certification	Certified units/sales
Australia (ARIA)	Gold	35,000^{‡}
New Zealand (RMNZ)	Platinum	15,000^{*}
United States (RIAA)	Gold	500,000^{‡}
^{*} Sales figures based on certification alone.^{‡} Sales+streaming figures based on certification alone.
