= Junior Eurovision Song Contest 2015 =

International song competition for youth

- #Discover

Date and venue
- Final: 21 November 2015
- Venue: Arena Armeets; Sofia, Bulgaria

Organisation
- Organiser: European Broadcasting Union (EBU)
- Executive supervisor: Vladislav Yakovlev

Production
- Host broadcaster: Bulgarian National Television (BNT)
- Directors: Christian Biondani; Gordon Bonello
- Executive producer: Joana Levieva-Sawyer
- Presenter: Poli Genova

Participants
- Number of entries: 17
- Debuting countries: Australia; Ireland
- Returning countries: Albania; Macedonia
- Non-returning countries: Croatia; Cyprus; Sweden
- Participation map: Competing countries Countries that participated in the past but not in 2015

Vote
- Voting system: Each country/jury awards 12, 10, 8–1 points to their 10 favourite songs.
- Winning song: Malta "Not My Soul"

The Junior Eurovision Song Contest 2015 was the thirteenth edition of the Junior Eurovision Song Contest, held on 21 November 2015 at the Arena Armeets in Sofia, Bulgaria, and presented by Poli Genova. It was organised by the European Broadcasting Union (EBU) and host broadcaster Bulgarian National Television (BNT). It was the first time that the contest was hosted in Bulgaria.

Broadcasters from a total of seventeen countries participated, with Australia and Ireland making their debuts. Albania and Macedonia returned after being absent since the 2012 and 2013 contests, respectively. Croatia and Cyprus withdrew after returning in the 2014 edition, while Sweden withdrew for the first time since 2008.

The winner was Malta with the song "Not My Soul" by Destiny Chukunyere. Armenia and Slovenia finished in second and third place, respectively. This was Malta's second victory in the Junior Eurovision Song Contest, having won previously in 2013. This contest marked the second time a country won twice in a three-year period (following Belarus winning twice in a period of three years between 2005 and 2007). Malta's 185 points were also the highest number of points ever received at the time, beating Spain's record of 171 points set during the 2004 edition.

== Location ==
Locations of the bidding countries. The eliminated countries are marked in red. The chosen host country is marked in blue.

Arena Armeec, in Sofia. Venue for the 2015 Junior Eurovision.

=== Bidding phase and host selection ===
Following Italy's win at the Junior Eurovision Song Contest 2014, the European Broadcasting Union had given the Italian broadcaster RAI the first refusal to host the 2015 contest. However, on 15 January 2015, RAI declined the right to host the contest. The Executive Supervisor for the Junior Eurovision Song Contest, Vladislav Yakovlev, praised the Italian broadcaster RAI for their time looking into the possibilities of hosting, even though they made their debut appearance in 2014, and further explained how the EBU were in a lucky position to have received bids from two countries.

The EBU announced later that day that they had received bids from two countries to host the contest; those countries being Bulgaria and last year host Malta, who finished in second and fourth places respectively in 2014. Bulgarian broadcaster BNT confirmed on 15 January they had submitted a bid to host the 2015 contest. The national broadcaster for Malta, Public Broadcasting Services (PBS), stated prior to the 2014 contest that they would host again if they won.

On 26 January 2015, it was announced that Bulgaria had been chosen to host the 2015 edition, which took place on 21 November 2015. It was the first time that the nation organised any Eurovision event. Two venues in Sofia – Hall 1 of the National Palace of Culture and Arena Armeets – were considered and visited by EBU officials, including executive supervisor Vladislav Yakovlev, in February 2015. In March 2015, it was confirmed that Sofia would be the host city, with the Arena Armeec being the host venue.

== Participants ==
Cover art of the official album

On 7 October 2015, it was confirmed that seventeen countries would take part in the contest. Australia and Ireland made their debut, Albania returned after a two-year absence and Macedonia returned after a one-year absence. Croatia and Cyprus withdrew after returning in the 2014 edition, while Sweden withdrew for the first time since 2008. It was the first time since 2007, that 17 countries would take part.

Prior to the event, a digital compilation album featuring all the songs from the 2015 contest was put together by the European Broadcasting Union and released by Universal Music Group on 13 November 2015. This is the first since the Junior Eurovision Song Contest 2005 not to include karaoke versions of all the songs.

Participants of the Junior Eurovision Song Contest 2015
Country	Broadcaster	Artist	Song	Language	Songwriter(s)
Albania	RTSH	Mishela Rapo	"Dambaje"	Albanian, English (Note: "Dambaje" is an imaginary word.)	Adrian Hila; Pandi Laço
Armenia	AMPTV	Mika	"Love"	Armenian, English	Avet Barseghyan; Lilith Navasardyan; Michael Varosyan
Australia	SBS	Bella Paige	"My Girls"	English	Mitch Allan; Delta Goodrem; Vince Pizzinga
Belarus	BTRC	Ruslan Aslanov	"Volshebstvo (Magic)" (Волшебство)	Russian, English	Ruslan Aslanov; Vitaliy Kurovskiy; Ruslan Kvinta
Bulgaria	BNT	Gabriela Yordanova and Ivan Stoyanov	"Colour of Hope"	Bulgarian	Evgeni Dimitrov; Georgi Milchev-Godjy; Slavi Trifonov; Ivaylo Vulchev; Gabriela Yordanova
Georgia	GPB	The Virus	"Gabede" (გაბედე)	Georgian	Erekle Deisadze; Giga Kukhianidze
Ireland	TG4	Aimee Banks	"Réalta na Mara"	Irish	Aimee Banks; Jonas Gladnikoff; Brendan McCarthy; Niall Mooney
Italy	RAI	Chiara and Martina	"Viva"	Italian	Fabrizio Berlincioni; Luigi D'Alessio; Adriano Pennino; Chiara Scarpari; Martina Scarpari
Macedonia	MRT	Ivana Petkovska and Magdalena Aleksovska	"Pletenka – Braid of Love" (Плетенка)	Macedonian	Magdalena Aleksovska; Ivana Petkovska
Malta	PBS	Destiny Chukunyere	"Not My Soul"	English	Destiny Chukunyere; Matthew "Muxu" Mercieca; Elton Zarb
Montenegro	RTCG	Jana Mirković	"Oluja" (Олуја)	Montenegrin	Jana Mirković; Boban Novović; Mirsad Serhatlić
Netherlands	AVROTROS	Shalisa	"Million Lights"	Dutch, English	Joost Griffioen; Hansen Tomas; Shalisa van der Laan
Russia	VGTRK	Mikhail Smirnov	"Mechta (Dream)" (Мечта)	Russian, English	Vladimir Dushevny; Mikhail Smirnov
San Marino	SMRTV	Kamilla Ismailova	"Mirror"	Italian, English	Andrelli; Josefin Glenmark; Kamilla Ismailova; Piero Romitelli
Serbia	RTS	Lena Stamenković	"Lenina pesma" (Ленина песма)	Serbian	Lena Stamenković; Leontina Vukomanović
Slovenia	RTVSLO	Lina Kuduzović	"Prva ljubezen"	Slovene, English	Lina Kuduzović; Sebina Kuduzović; Maraaya; Krešimir Tomec
Ukraine	NTU	Anna Trincher	"Pochny z sebe" (Почни з себе)	Ukrainian, English	Vadim Lisitsa; Olena Topolya; Anna Trincher

== Format ==
=== Graphic design ===
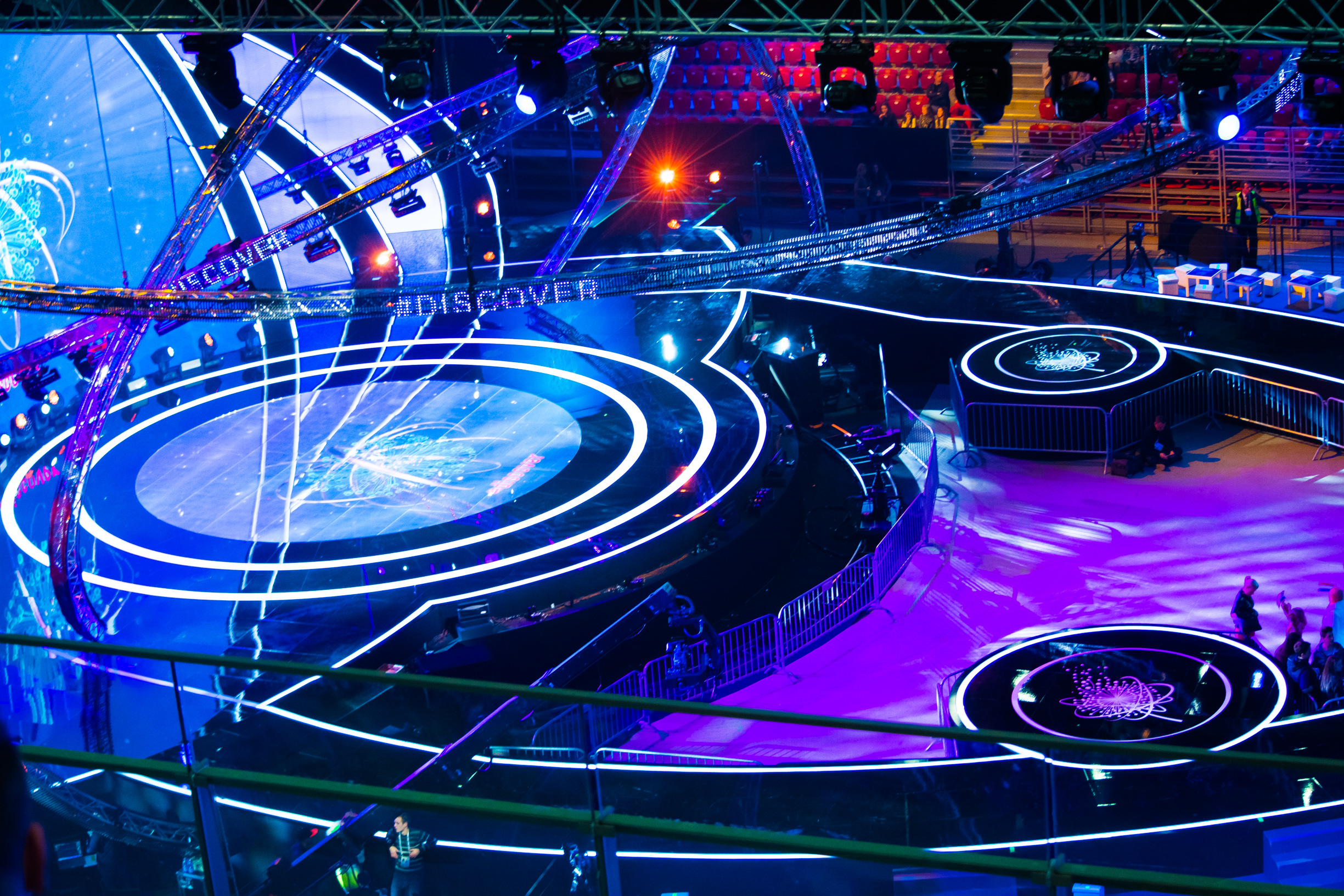
Arena Armeec stage during the 2015 Junior Eurovision.

On 22 May 2015, a press conference devoted to the Junior Eurovision Song Contest was held in Vienna during the organisation of the Eurovision Song Contest 2015. At the press conference, the slogan for the 2015 Junior contest was revealed to be #Discover. The slogan was selected to signify how the Junior Eurovision Song Contest endeavours to find new melodies, explore new people and create links between individuals.

On 23 June 2015, the EBU in conjunction with the host broadcaster BNT, presented the official logo for the 2015 edition, during the Steering Group meeting held in Sofia. Viara Ankova, the Director General of the host broadcaster explained that the logo's concept was inspired behind the idea of a seeded head of a dandelion being blown, "something that everyone has done as a child".

The logo shows how Bulgaria's young people are the seeds of the future; venturing out from the safety of tradition to explore and discover a new future for themselves and for us all.

— Viara Ankova, General Director of BNT

=== Postcards ===
The postcards used to introduce each competing nation during the show were built around the concept of selfies. The postcards featured the competing artists sending their selfie to a group of three teenagers in Bulgaria, which would then inspire their adventures. Different sights and cities were showcased with the teenagers documenting their journey through their own selfies and sending them to the competing artist.

=== Host ===
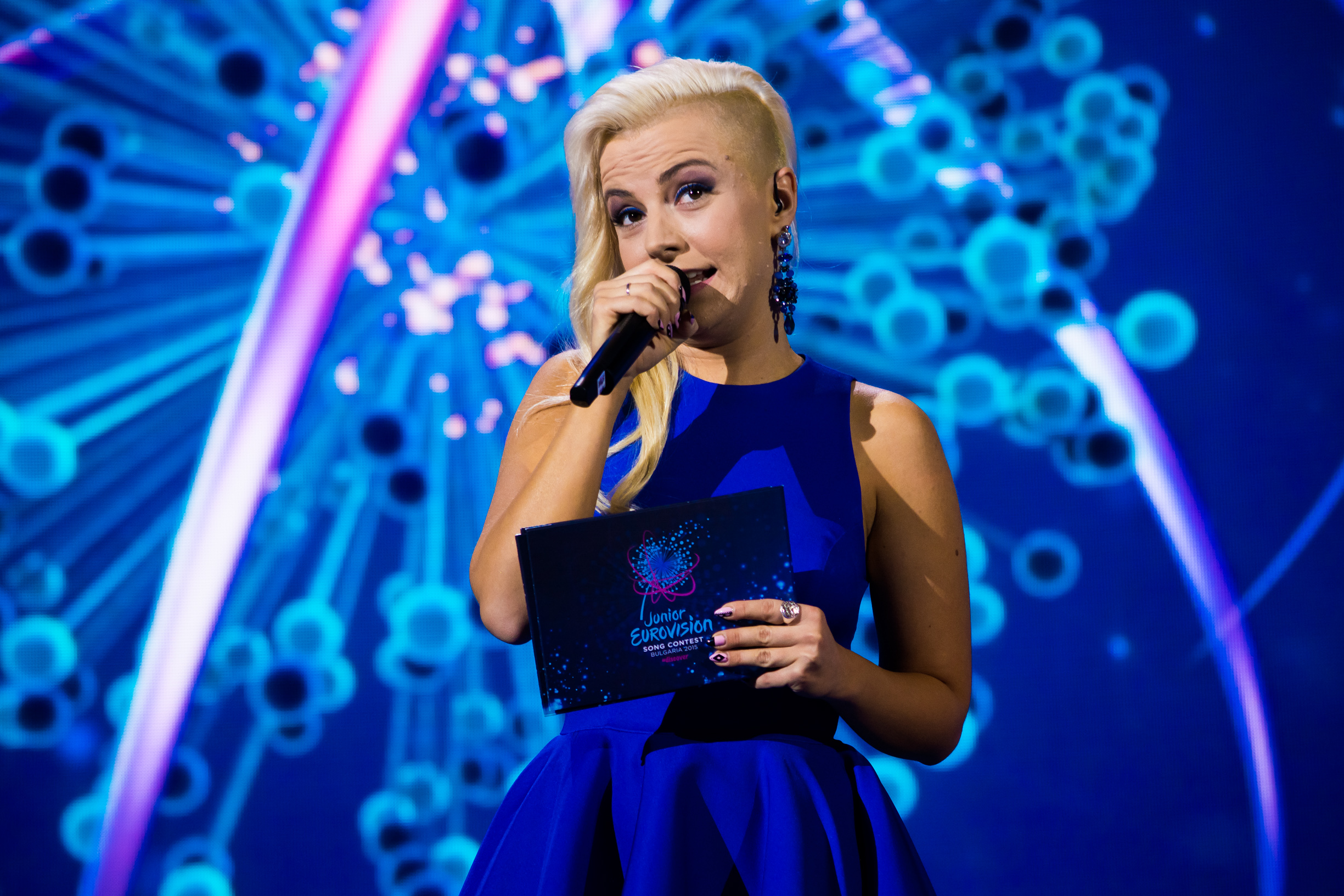
Poli Genova during the contest

Bulgarian singer Poli Genova was announced as the host of the competition on 21 October 2015. Genova had previously represented Bulgaria at the Eurovision Song Contest in 2011. In addition, the running order draw and opening ceremonies were hosted by Bulgarian singer Joanna Dragneva, who had also previously represented Bulgaria at the Eurovision Song Contest in 2008 as part of Deep Zone Project.

== Contest overview ==
The event took place on 21 November 2015 at 20:30 EET (19:30 CET). Seventeen countries participated, with the running order published on 15 November 2015. All the countries competing were eligible to vote with the jury and televote, as well as a Kids Jury, eligible to vote. Malta won with 185 points, with Armenia, Slovenia, Belarus, and Albania completing the top five. Montenegro, San Marino, the Netherlands, Italy, and Macedonia occupied the bottom five positions.

The opening of the show featured Krisia Todorova, Bulgaria's 2014 representative alongside Hasan & Ibrahim, performed a short reworked sequence of the theme song "#Discover". The participants were introduced bt the traditional flag parade to the theme music with dancers on stage and were joined at the end by host Genova who sang the last line of the theme song. The interval acts included the competing artists perform the theme song together, Genova performed during the interlude whilst Bulgaria's representatives in 2014 performed their second placed entry "Planet of the Children" as well as new song "Not The Only One". Vincenzo Cantiello closed the interval and performed his winning song "Tu primo grande amore".

R/O	Country	Artist	Song	Points	Place (Note: Three songs tied for 12th highest score with 36 points, but the official scoreboard ranks respectively Ireland as 12th, Montenegro as 13th and San Marino as 14th. This is consistent with the tie-breaking rule that the song that received points from the most countries ranks higher in the case of a tie.)
1	Serbia	Lena Stamenković	"Lenina pesma"	79	7
2	Georgia	The Virus	"Gabede"	51	10
3	Slovenia	Lina Kuduzović	"Prva ljubezen"	112	3
4	Italy	Chiara and Martina	"Viva"	34	16
5	Netherlands	Shalisa	"Million Lights"	35	15
6	Australia	Bella Paige	"My Girls"	64	8
7	Ireland	Aimee Banks	"Réalta na Mara"	36	12
8	Russia	Mikhail Smirnov	"Mechta (Dream)"	80	6
9	Macedonia	Ivana Petkovska and Magdalena Aleksovska	"Pletenka – Braid of Love"	26	17
10	Belarus	Ruslan Aslanov	"Volshebstvo (Magic)"	105	4
11	Armenia	Mika	"Love"	176	2
12	Ukraine	Anna Trincher	"Pochny z sebe"	38	11
13	Bulgaria	Gabriela Yordanova and Ivan Stoyanov	"Colour of Hope"	62	9
14	San Marino	Kamilla Ismailova	"Mirror"	36	14
15	Malta	Destiny Chukunyere	"Not My Soul"	185	1
16	Albania	Mishela Rapo	"Dambaje"	93	5
17	Montenegro	Jana Mirković	"Oluja"	36	13

=== Spokespersons ===
The order in which each country announced their votes was the same as the running order of the performances. Details of the running order were published by the EBU on 15 November 2015. The spokespersons are shown below alongside each participating country.

1. Kids Jury – Krisia Todorova
2. Serbia – Dunja Jeličić
3. Georgia – Lizi Pop
4. Slovenia – Nikola Petek
5. Italy – Vincenzo Cantiello
6. Netherlands – Julia van Bergen
7. Australia – Ellie Blackwell
8. Ireland – Anna Banks
9. Russia – Sofia Dolganova
10. Macedonia – Aleksandrija Čaliovski
11. Belarus – Valeria Drobyshevskaya
12. Armenia – Betty
13. Ukraine – Sofia Kutsenko
14. Bulgaria – Vladimir Petkov
15. San Marino – Arianna Ulivi
16. Malta – Federica Falzon
17. Albania – Majda Bejzade
18. Montenegro – Lejla Vulić

== Detailed voting results ==
Destiny Chukunyere who represented Malta with the song "Not My Soul", was declared the winner after all the votes had been cast from all of the seventeen participating countries and the kids' jury. Below is a full breakdown of how the votes were cast.

Split results
Place	Combined		Jury		Televoting	
Place	Country	Points	Country	Points	Country	Points
1	Malta	185	Malta	157	Malta	143
2	Armenia	176	Armenia	149	Armenia	134
3	Slovenia	112	Belarus	101	Slovenia	98
4	Belarus	105	Slovenia	77	Albania	86
5	Albania	93	Serbia	73	Bulgaria	77
6	Russia	80	Albania	69	Russia	65
7	Serbia	79	Australia	67	Belarus	61
8	Australia	64	Russia	57	Serbia	53
9	Bulgaria	62	Netherlands	53	San Marino	51
10	Georgia	51	Italy	43	Ireland	43
11	Ukraine	38	Georgia	40	Georgia	41
12	Ireland	36	Montenegro	21	Ukraine	35
13	Montenegro	36	Ukraine	19	Australia	32
14	San Marino	36	Ireland	19	Montenegro	23
15	Netherlands	35	San Marino	15	Macedonia	22
16	Italy	34	Bulgaria	14	Italy	13
17	Macedonia	26	Macedonia	12	Netherlands	9

Detailed voting results
Voting procedure used: 50% jury and televote 100% jury vote		Total score	Kids Jury	Serbia	Georgia	Slovenia	Italy	Netherlands	Australia	Ireland	Russia	Macedonia	Belarus	Armenia	Ukraine	Bulgaria	San Marino	Malta	Albania	Montenegro
Contestants	Serbia	79	4			7		4	2	3	5	12	4	4		5	5			12
Contestants	Georgia	51		3						4	1		5	8	5			1	8	4
Contestants	Slovenia	112	6	6	5		7	8	6	6	8	1	8	10	10	8	6	3		2
Contestants	Italy	34		2										3				12	4	1
Contestants	Netherlands	35	1		6	5	1		4							4	2			
Contestants	Australia	64	7		7		3	3		2	3	2	1	1	2		3	10	5	3
Contestants	Ireland	36			2	4		2	5		2					2	1	6		
Contestants	Russia	80	5	7		6	4	6	1			3	7	7	4	7	8		3	
Contestants	Macedonia	26		1												1			7	5
Contestants	Belarus	105	8	5	8	3	2	7	7	7	10	4		5	7	3	7	4	6	
Contestants	Armenia	176	10	10	12	10	6	12	10	8	12	10	12		8	10	10	7	10	7
Contestants	Ukraine	38	2		3		5		3	1	4		6						2	
Contestants	Bulgaria	62			1	1	8	5		12		6			3			8		6
Contestants	San Marino	36									7		3	2	12					
Contestants	Malta	185	12	12	10	12	10	10	12	10	6	5	10	12	6	12	12		12	10
Contestants	Albania	93	3	4	4	8	12	1	8	5		7	2	6	1	6	4	2		8
Contestants	Montenegro	36		8		2						8						5	1	

=== 12 points ===
Below is a summary of all 12 points received. All countries were given 12 points at the start of voting to ensure that no country finished with nul points.

N.	Contestant	Nation(s) giving 12 points
8	Malta	Albania, Armenia, Australia, Bulgaria, Kids Jury, San Marino, Serbia, Slovenia
4	Armenia	Belarus, Georgia, Netherlands, Russia
2	Serbia	Macedonia, Montenegro
1	Albania	Italy
1	Bulgaria	Ireland
1	Italy	Malta
1	San Marino	Ukraine

== Other countries ==
For a country to be eligible for potential participation in the Junior Eurovision Song Contest, it needs to be an active member of the European Broadcasting Union (EBU). It is unknown whether the EBU issue invitations of participation to all 56 active members like they do for the Eurovision Song Contest. The EBU Active Members listed below have made the announcements regards their decisions.

=== Active EBU members ===
- Cyprus – On 29 June 2015, the national broadcaster of Cyprus, Cyprus Broadcasting Corporation (CyBC), revealed that they would not participate in the 2015 contest due to lack of funds.
- France – France 2 announced on 24 June 2015 that they had no plans to return to the contest, however the broadcaster sent a delegation to Bulgaria in order to observe the 2015 edition.
- Germany – Zweites Deutsches Fernsehen (ZDF) were observers at last year's contest. On 2 June 2015, Norddeutscher Rundfunk (NDR) stated that they had not ruled out a début in the 2015 contest. On 1 July 2015, ARD consortium member NDR launched an online poll to decide whether or not Germany should participate in Junior Eurovision, which would be broadcast on their children's station, KiKa (which is a joint venture of ARD and ZDF). Germany was originally on the list of participants for the inaugural contest and again in 2004 but later withdrew. The debut of the country in the competition didn't materialize. However, on 4 November 2015, it was announced that NDR would broadcast a livestream of the contest on their Eurovision website for the first time.
- Greece – Hellenic Broadcasting Corporation (ERT) stated on 11 June 2015 that they were undecided about returning to the Junior contest but are "willing to examine interesting projects". However, the country was not among the 2015 edition's list of participants.
- Romania – On 4 June 2015, Televisiunea Românâ (TVR) revealed that due to lack of interest, Romania's participation in the 2015 contest would be unlikely.
- Spain – Several media outlets reported that Televisión Española (TVE) was working on returning to the contest in 2015. However, these claims were not confirmed by the broadcaster. Ultimately the country was not among the 2015 edition's list of participants.
- Sweden – Sveriges Television (SVT) announced on 29 June 2015 that the broadcaster would withdraw from the contest for one year to focus on new youth-focused projects and hosting the Eurovision Song Contest 2016.

=== Non-active EBU members ===
In August 2014, executive supervisor Vladislav Yakovlev said that they are working on finding a way to allow commercial networks to participate in the contest, although they are not EBU members.

- Spain – Because Spanish broadcaster EBU member, Televisión Española (TVE), has declined invitations to participate since 2007, the European Broadcasting Union TV Committee will discuss in the coming months the possibility to allow commercial channels to take part in the contest. If the final decision is yes, they will continue negotiating with Spanish private TV channels to bring back Spain to the contest.

== Broadcasts ==
The contest was broadcast online worldwide through the official Junior Eurovision Song Contest website and YouTube. The online broadcasts featured commentary in English by junioreurovision.tv editor Luke Fisher and 2011 Bulgarian Junior Eurovision Song Contest entrant Ivan Ivanov.

Broadcasters and commentators in participating countries
Country	Broadcaster(s)	Channel(s)	Commentator(s)	Ref.
Albania	RTSH	TVSH, RTSH Muzikë, Radio Tirana	Andri Xhahu	
Armenia	AMPTV	Armenia 1	Avet Barseghyan	
Australia	SBS	SBS One	Ash London and Toby Truslove	
Belarus	BTRC	Belarus 1, Belarus 24	Anatoly Lipetski	
Bulgaria	BNT	BNT 1, BNT HD, BNT World	Elena Rosberg and Georgi Kushvaliev	
Georgia	GPB	1TV	Tuta Chkheidze	
Ireland	TG4		Stiofán Ó Fearail and Caitlín Nic Aoidh	
Italy	Rai	Rai Gulp	Simone Lijoi	
Macedonia	MRT	MRT 1	Tina Tautovic and Spasija Veljanoska	
Malta	PBS	TVM2 (live), TVM (delayed)	Corazon Mizzi	
Montenegro	RTCG	TVCG 2 (live), TVCG SAT (delayed)	Ajda Šufta and Ivan Maksimović	
Netherlands	AVROTROS (via NPO)	NPO 3	Jan Smit	
Russia	VGRTK, C1R	Carousel	Olga Shelest	
San Marino	SMRTV	RTVSM	Lia Fiorio and Gilberto Gattei	
Serbia	RTS	RTS2, RTS Satelit	Silvana Grujić	
Slovenia	RTVSLO	TV SLO 1	Andrej Hofer	
Ukraine	Suspil'ne (UA:PBC)	UA:Pershyi	Timur Miroshnychenko	

The following non-participating countries also sent commentators to Bulgaria for radio, television and online broadcasts of the contest.

Broadcasters and commentators in non-participating countries
Country	Broadcaster(s)	Channel(s)	Commentator(s)	Ref.
Germany	NDR	NDR website	Thomas Mohr	
New Zealand	World FM		Ewan Spence	
Singapore	247 Music Radio		Ewan Spence	
United Kingdom	Cotswold FM, Fun Kids, Oystermouth Radio, Radio Six International, Shore Radio		Ewan Spence	
United States	WUSB		Ewan Spence	

== Other awards ==
=== Press vote ===
At the press center during the contest, members of the press were allowed to vote for their favourite acts. Below is the top five overall results, after all the votes had been cast.

Country	Song	Performer(s)	Result
Malta	"Not My Soul"	Destiny Chukunyere	759
Australia	"My Girls"	Bella Paige	642
Armenia	"Love"	Michael Varosyan	543
Russia	"Mechta (Dream)"	Mikhail Smirnov	520
Serbia	"Lenina pesma"	Lena Stamenković	499

== See also ==
- ABU Radio Song Festival 2015
- ABU TV Song Festival 2015
- Bala Turkvision Song Contest 2015
- Eurovision Song Contest 2015
- Eurovision Young Dancers 2015
- Turkvision Song Contest 2015
