= Latvia in the Junior Eurovision Song Contest 2010 =

- Junior Eurovision Song Contest 2010
- Country: Latvia
- Selection process: Internal selection
- Announcement date: Artist: 30 July 2010; Song: 8 October 2010

Competing entry
- Song: "Viva la Dance (Dejo tā)"
- Artist: Šarlote Lēnmane

Placement
- Final result: 10th, 51 points

Participation chronology

Latvia was represented at the Junior Eurovision Song Contest 2010 which took place on 20 November 2010, in Minsk, Belarus. The Latvian broadcaster Latvijas Televīzija (LTV) selected the Latvian entry for the 2010 contest internally.

== Before Junior Eurovision ==
=== Internal selection ===
On 30 July 2010, LTV announced that they had selected the winner of Balss pavēlnieks, Šarlote Lēnmane, to represent Latvia at the Junior Eurovision Song Contest 2010. Her song "Viva la Dance (Dejo tā)" was presented on 8 October 2010.

== At Junior Eurovision ==
=== Voting ===
Points awarded to Latvia
Score	Country
12 points (Note: All countries received one set of 12 points to ensure no country finished with nul points.)	
10 points	
8 points	Lithuania; Moldova
7 points	
6 points	Netherlands
5 points	Georgia; Malta; Ukraine
4 points	
3 points	
2 points	
1 point	Belgium; Sweden

Points awarded by Latvia
Score	Country
12 points	Belarus
10 points	Serbia
8 points	Russia
7 points	Georgia
6 points	Lithuania
5 points	Armenia
4 points	Sweden
3 points	Netherlands
2 points	Moldova
1 point	Macedonia
