= List of number-one songs of the 1960s (Chile) =

This is a list of the songs that reached number one in Chile in the 1960s, according to Billboard magazine.

== 1961 ==
Issue date	Song	Artist	Ref.
February	"La novia"	Antonio Prieto	
March	"Are You Lonesome Tonight?"	Elvis Presley	
April	"Summer's Gone"	Paul Anka	
May	"Will You Love Me Tomorrow"	The Shirelles	
June 19	"Will You Love Me Tomorrow"	The Shirelles	
June 26	"Will You Love Me Tomorrow"	The Shirelles	
July 3	"Poetry in Motion"	Pat Henry	
July 10	"Poetry in Motion"	Pat Henry	
July 17	"Poetry in Motion"	Pat Henry	
July 24	"Runaway"	Del Shannon	
July 31	"Runaway"	Del Shannon	
August 7	"Wheels"	The String-A-Longs	
August 14	"Wheels"	The String-A-Longs	
August 21	"Wheels"	The String-A-Longs	
August 28	"Wheels"	The String-A-Longs	
September 4	"Wheels"	The String-A-Longs	
September 11	"Wheels"	The String-A-Longs	
September 18	"Wheels"	The String-A-Longs	
September 25	"Wheels"	The String-A-Longs	
October 2	"Wheels"	The String-A-Longs	
October 9	"Wheels"	The String-A-Longs	
October 16	"Wheels"	The String-A-Longs	
October 23	"Los coléricos"	Los Cóndores	

== 1962 ==
Issue date	Song	Artist	Ref.
June	"El rock del mundial"	The Ramblers	
August 25	"Río rebelde"	Lorenzo Valderrama	
December 15	"La novia de enero"	Los 4 Hermanos Silva / Lorenzo Valderrama	

== 1963 ==
Issue date	Song	Artist	Ref.
January 26	"Que se mueran los feos"	Luis Aguilar	
March 2	"Bienvenido amor"	Sergio Inostroza	
March 30	"Bienvenido amor"	Sergio Inostroza	
June 8	"No quiero ser"	Ginette Acevedo	
June 22	"No quiero ser"	Ginette Acevedo	
July 20	"Tell Him"	Billie Davis	
September 7	"Puente Pexoa"	Ginette Acevedo	
November 30	"Esta noche"	Silvinho	

== 1964 ==
Issue date	Song	Artist	Ref.
April 11	"Se mi vuoi lasciare"	Michele / Carlos González	
May 9	"Qué bonita va"	Los Cuatro Cuartos	
July 18	"Cómo te extraño mi amor"	Leo Dan / Willy Monti	
August 1	"Nathalie"	Gilbert Bécaud	
August 22	"Nathalie"	Gilbert Bécaud / Hermanos Arriagada	
September 19	"Nathalie"	Gilbert Bécaud / Hermanos Arriagada	
October 10	"Angelito"	René y René / Sergio Inostroza / Los Seven Days	
October 24	"Angelito"	René y René / Sergio Inostroza / Los Seven Days	
October 31	"I Should Have Known Better"	The Beatles	
December 5	"Esto"	Carlos González / Leo Dan	
December 12	"Jamás"	The Ramblers	

== 1965 ==
Issue date	Song	Artist	Ref.
January 9	"Jamás"	The Ramblers	
January 16	"Can't Buy Me Love"	The Beatles	
February 6	"Aleluya"	Cecilia	
May 22	"Eight Days a Week"	The Beatles	
June 26	"Vete con ella"	Mayté Gaos / Marisole	
August 7	"Lección de besos (Letkiss)"	Piero Sancho y su Orquesta / Bambi	
September 11	"Arriba en la cordillera"	Patricio Manns	
September 18	"El cachivache (O Calhambeque)"	Piero y su Conjunto / Jorge Romero	
October 23	"Il silenzio"	Nini Rosso / Georges Jouvin	
November 20	"Zorba's Dance"	Duo Acropolis / Trio Hellenique / Richard Davis / Mimis Plessas	

== 1966 ==
Issue date	Song	Artist	Ref.
March 26	"Rosa María"	Los Moonlights	
May 21	"Rosa María"	Los Moonlights	
December 17	"Vita mia"	Tony Del Monaco	
December 31	"Vita mia"	Tony Del Monaco	

== 1967 ==
Issue date	Song	Artist	Ref.
January 14	"Você Me Acende"	Erasmo Carlos / Pepe Pato con Los Stereos	
July 1	"Un mechón de cabello"	Salvatore Adamo	
September 16	"Es la lluvia que cae"	Los Iracundos / Los Harmonic's / Pat Henry	
September 23	"Es la lluvia que cae"	Los Iracundos / Los Harmonic's / Pat Henry	
October 21	"Es la lluvia que cae"	Los Iracundos / Los Harmonic's / Pat Henry	
October 28	"Es la lluvia que cae"	Los Iracundos / Los Harmonic's / Pat Henry	
December 9	"Sé que no volverás"	Los Iracundos	
December 16	"The World We Knew (Over and Over)"	Frank Sinatra	

== 1968 ==
Issue date	Song	Artist	Ref.
March 23	"The Letter"	The Box Tops	
March 30	"Novia de verano"	José Alfredo Fuentes	
July 6	"To Sir with Love"	Lulu	
July 13	"To Sir with Love"	Lulu	

== See also ==
- 1960s in music
