= List of number-one hits of 1964 (Peru) =

This is a list of the songs that reached number one in Peru in 1964, according to Billboard magazine with data provided by the Peruvian newspaper, La Prensa

| Issue date | Song | Artist(s) | Ref |
|---|---|---|---|
| January 4 | "Mira como me balanceo (Guarda come dondolo)" | Edoardo Vianello | |
| February 1 | "If I Had a Hammer" | Trini Lopez | |
| February 22 | "Celia" | Leo Dan | |
| March 7 | "Limena" | Pérez Prado/Enrique Lynch/Carlos Pickling | |
| March 28 | "Fanny" | Leo Dan | |
| April 11 | "Fanny" | Leo Dan | |
| April 25 | "Te Pido Que Me Guíes" | Leo Dan | |
| May 16 | "Te Pido Que Me Guíes" | Leo Dan | |
| July 4 | "Esta noche (Esta Noite)" | Silvinho | |
| July 11 | "Cómo te extraño mi amor" | Leo Dan | |
| July 18 | "Cómo te extraño mi amor" | Leo Dan | |
| August 1 | "Cómo te extraño mi amor" | Leo Dan | |
| August 15 | "Cómo te extraño mi amor" | Leo Dan | |
| August 29 | "Cómo te extraño mi amor" | Leo Dan | |
| September 5 | "Cómo te extraño mi amor" | Leo Dan | |
| September 26 | "I Saw Her Standing There" | The Beatles | |
| October 17 | "I Saw Her Standing There" | The Beatles | |
| October 24 | "I Saw Her Standing There" | The Beatles | |
| October 31 | "I Saw Her Standing There" | The Beatles | |
| November 7 | "Angelito" | René y René | |
| November 21 | "Angelito" | René y René | |
| November 28 | "Vestida de novia" | Carmita Jiménez/Palito Ortega/Koko Montana | |
| December 12 | "Vestida de novia" | Carmita Jiménez/Palito Ortega/Koko Montana | |

== See also ==
- 1964 in music
