= Mariolino Barberis =

Italian singer

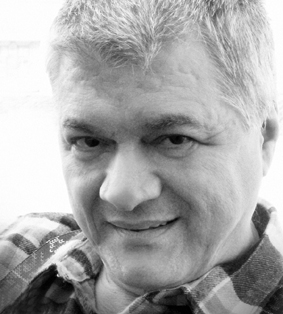
- Barberis performing live in 2007

Background information
- Born: Mario Barberis; 14 August 1949 (age 77); Turin, Italy
- Genres: Pop, beat
- Occupations: Singer, musician
- Instruments: Vocals, piano
- Years active: 1964–present
- Labels: ECO, ARC, DKF, DRUMS

Mariolino Barberis (born Mario Barberis, 14 August 1949) is an Italian singer and musician.

== Biography ==
Barberis was born in Turin on 14 August 1949. At the age of eleven in 1960, he began performing in local competitions and events in Piedmont, winning a contest for newcomers in Laigueglia three years in a row (1960–1962). Subsequently, he recorded his first tracks for the ECO record label in Milan (Monza). While continuing his studies with the Salesians, he took singing lessons from master Piero Pasero.

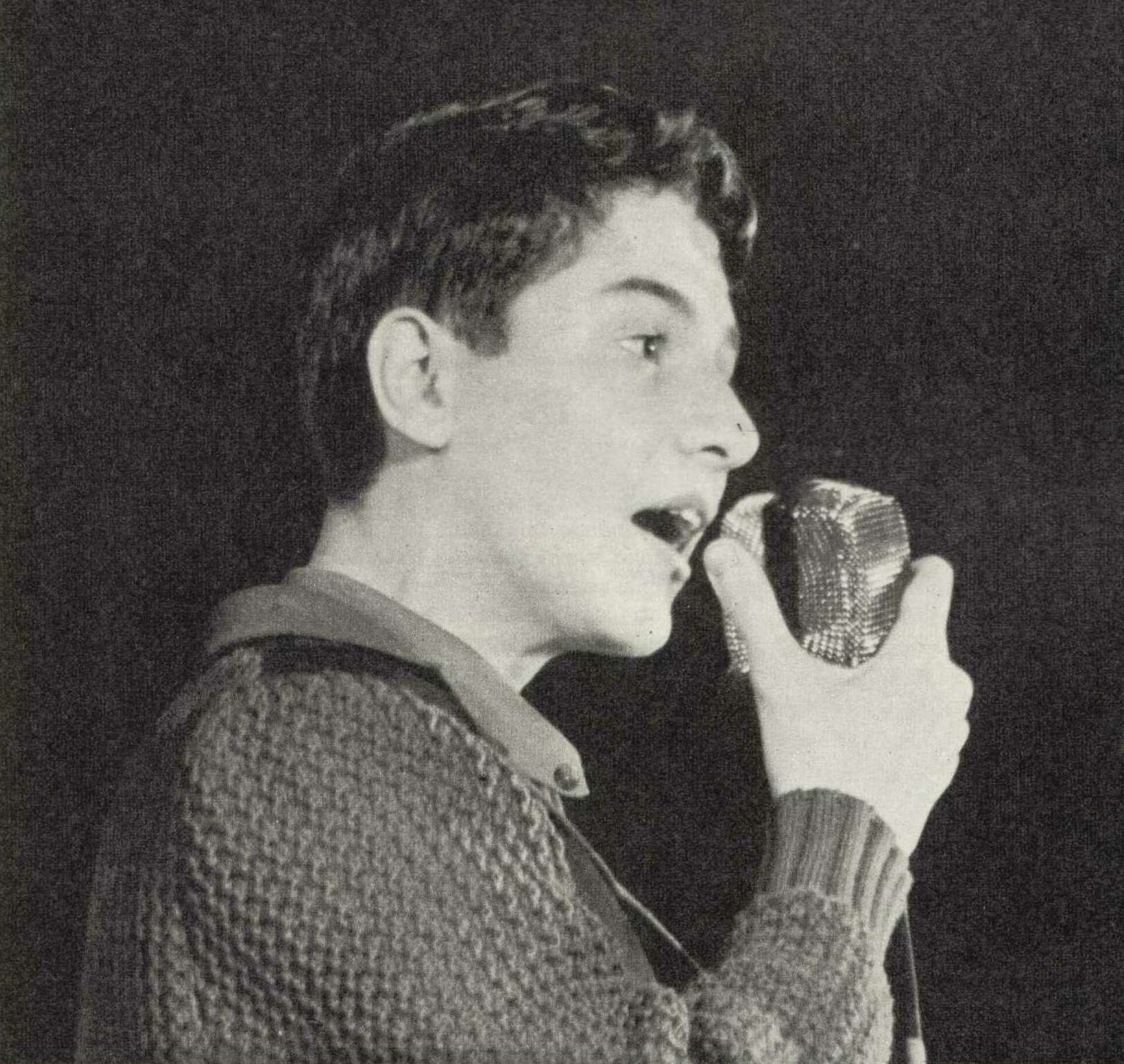
Mariolino Barberis live in 1965

In 1964, he participated in the Castrocaro Festival, a well-known competition for new voices, presenting the song "La mia città" with Little Tony as his mentor. There, he was noticed by Teddy Reno, who offered him a recording contract with ARC. The following year, he participated in the Cantagiro (Group B for young newcomers), winning first place with the song "Il duca della luna" (lyrics by Giancarlo Guardabassi, music by Gianfranco Caligiani, arranged and conducted by Ennio Morricone, featuring backing vocals by Alessandro Alessandroni's I Cantori Moderni).

Due to his wide vocal range and a physical impairment caused by childhood polio that forced him to use a walking stick, the press nicknamed him the "Tajoli of the 1960s".

Barberis began performing live accompanied by Flash, a group of three young musicians from Turin consisting of Marcello Capra (guitar), Angelo Girardi (bass), and Mark Astarita (drums), who would later play in prominent Italian progressive rock bands such as Procession and Venegoni & Co.

In 1966, Barberis won the Cantagiro again with "Spiaggia d'argento" and appeared on several television programs, including Settevoci, hosted by Pippo Baudo. Later, he switched to the DKF Folklore label, associated with Happy Ruggiero's Format recording studio in Turin. With this label, he participated in the 9th Venetian Song Festival in Sandrigo with "Salvé Venesia" (1967) and recorded a cover of "Il posto mio" (originally presented by Tony Renis at the Sanremo Music Festival 1968) as well as "Questa è la città", which Barberis co-wrote with Ruggiero. In later years, he recorded under his birth name, Mario Barberis, for the Drums label.

== Discography ==
=== Singles ===
- 1961 – "Scende la sera" (Collana Canti Ricreativi, Canti Scout Vol. 1) (ECO, ECO 1031)
- 1961 – "Canto del lupetto" (Collana Canti Ricreativi, Canti Scout Vol. 2) (ECO, ECO 1032)
- 1961 – "L'ali d'oro" / "Un amico" (ECO, ECO 1056S)
- 1965 – "Il duca della luna" / "Quando a settembre" (ARC, AN 4056)
- 1966 – "Spiaggia d'argento" / "Eppure ti amo" (ARC, AN 4087)
- 1967 – "Questa è la città" / "Tu lo vedrai" (DKF Folklore, KF 30042)
- 1967 – "Salvé Venesia" / "Raconto d'inverno" (DKF Folklore, KF 11037)
- 1968 – "Il posto mio" / "Agnese" (DKF Folklore, KF 30050)
- 1970 – "Un pianoforte nella sera" / "Rosso il tramonto" (DKF Folklore, KF 30076)
- 1985 – "Occhi di bimba" / "Nell'oscurità" (Drums, EDN 2215)

== Bibliography ==
- Gino Castaldo, ed. (1990). Dizionario della canzone italiana. Entry: "Barberis, Mariolino" by Enzo Giannelli, p. 107. Armando Curcio Editore.
- "La rivelazione del Festival di Castrocaro: Mariolino Barberis". Gli amici del disco (10): 23. November 1964. RCA Italiana.
