= Gohar Gasparyan (television presenter) =

Armenian television announcer and journalist

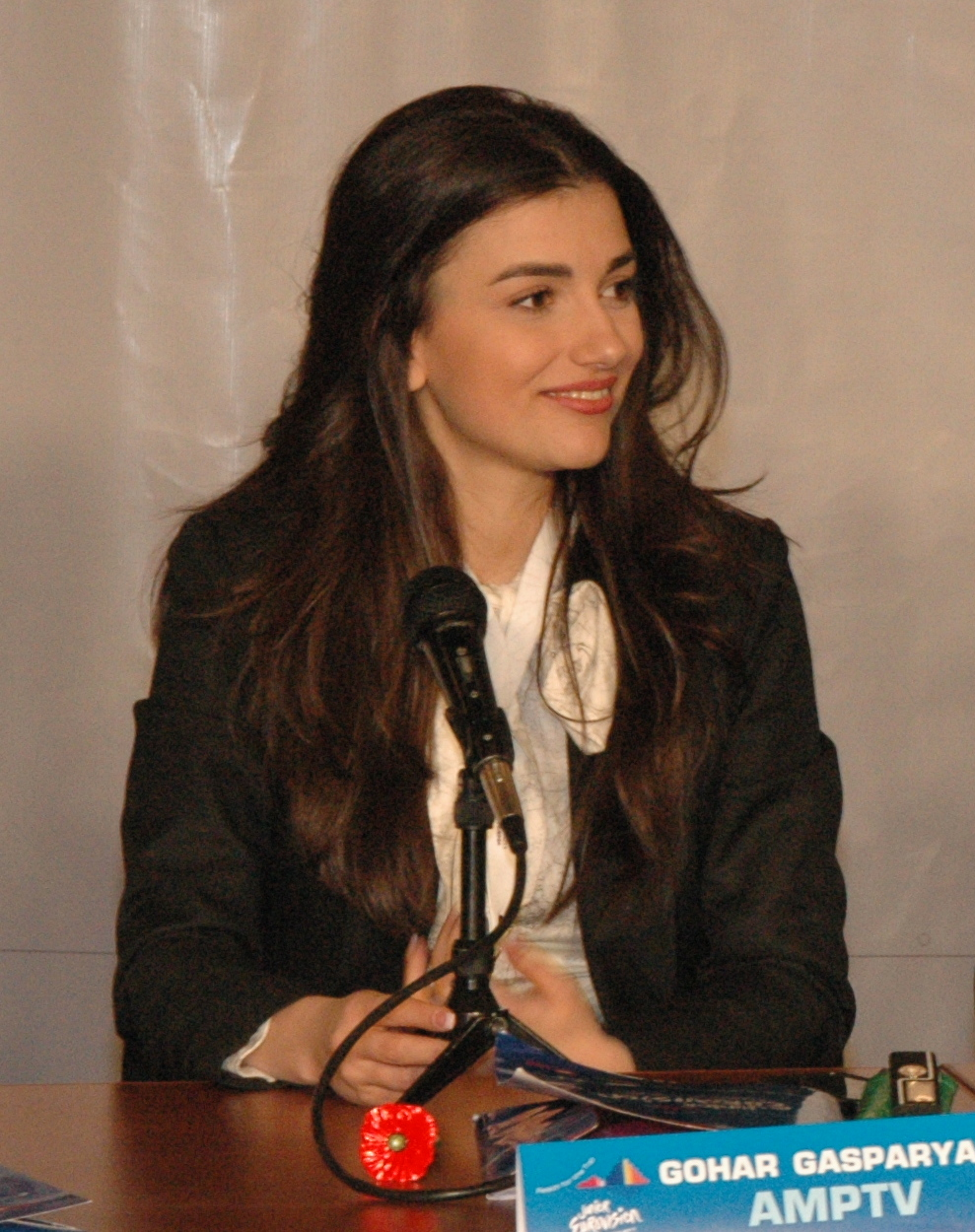
- Born: 19 October 1985 (age 40); Yerevan, Armenian SSR, Soviet Union
- Education: Yerevan State University
- Occupations: Television personality, model, journalist
- Years active: 1996–present
- Height: 173 cm (5 ft 8 in)
- Spouse: Narek Van Ashughatoyan

Gohar Gaspari Gasparyan (Armenian: Գոհար Գասպարի Գասպարյան; is an Armenian TV personality, journalist, and model who currently works at Public Television of Armenia. From 2010 to 2018, she was head of the Armenian delegation in Eurovision and Junior Eurovision Song Contest.

== Biography ==
Gasparyan was born on 19 October 1985 in Yerevan. Her father is a military man and her mother is a French language teacher. In 2002 she graduated from high school No. 114 School after "Khachik Dashtents" in Armenia. The same year she entered the State Linguistic University after Valery Bryusov, the department of English Language and International Journalism. Since 2003 she has been working at Armenian Public Television as TV host of international programs. In 2014 Gohar's childhood dream came true and she founded the first Armenian cotton candy brand called "Happyk". In July 2016 she married famous Armenian painter, lawyer Narek Van Ashughatoyan. She started hosting her first TV program at the age of 12. In 1996 she hosted two junior TV programs on The 3rd channel "Talented Children", "The Story of my childhood".

On 3 December 2011 Gasparyan and Avet Barseghyan were presenters of Junior Eurovision Song Contest 2011 in Yerevan.

Gasparyan was born in 1985 in Yerevan. In 2002 she graduated from Secondary School No. 114 after Kh. Dashtents. In 2002–07 she studied English language and international reporting at Yerevan State Linguistic University after V. Brjusov. In 2007–09 took a Master's Course at Yerevan State University Department of Journalism. Also received an international master's degree at SUA attached Armenian School of Journalism. In 1996–2001 was the host of program series for children and teens at Public TV 3rd Wave project (Talented Children, 3rd Wagon, etc.). Gohar has been working at Armenia Public TV as program host and author, commentator of international projects since 2003 (This Evening/Morning/Night, First Program, Rubicon, Top 10, etc. She is the commentator of Eurovision and Junior Eurovision song contests since 2006 and Head of Eurovision Armenian Delegation since 2010. In her activity as a host, a special place is with cultural and sport special projects, concerts and exclusive interviews (Junior Eurovision 2010 in Yerevan, Plácido Domingo, Jivan-80, Fanny Ardant, Arthur Abraham, Alain Delon, World Chess Champions, Eurovision National Selections, Golden Apricot, etc.), as well as organization of specific events (www.unistaff.am). Since 15 October 2012 Gohar has been the host of Found Dream TV show on First Channel. In 2013 hosted “Come and See” (Ari u tes) TV series at the Public Television.

Preceded by (Belarus) Leila Ismailava and Denis Kourian	Junior Eurovision Song Contest presenter 2011; With: Avet Barseghyan	Succeeded by (Netherlands) Kim-Lian van der Meij and Ewout Genemans
