= Ti lascio una canzone =

- Created by: Roberto Cenci
- Presented by: Antonella Clerici
- Judges: Claudio Cecchetto; Barbara De Rossi; Emilio Solfrizzi; Massimiliano Pani; Stefania Sandrelli; Orietta Berti, and more
- Voices of: many dubbers
- Country of origin: Italy
- Original language: Italian
- No. of seasons: 8

Production
- Producer: Ballandi Entertainment
- Production locations: Teatro Ariston; Auditorium Rai di Napoli
- Cinematography: Ivan Pierri
- Running time: 160 minutes

Original release
- Network: Rai Uno
- Release: 5 April 2008 – 28 November 2015

Ti lascio una canzone (English: Leavin' you a song) was an Italian music talent show for aspiring singers aged 7 to 15, all of whom were required to cover the most beloved songs in the history of Italian pop music.

The songs covered in the program, which represent the true stars of the show, are “golden oldies”. They are symbolically “left” for us, in what amounts to a musical heritage, to be interpreted by the singers of tomorrow, in order to ensure that the melodies and lyrics which have provided the background music to past generations are not lost. The songs are covered by young singing talents, who interpret the best-loved songs of Italian pop music during each broadcast.

Italian and international singing guests become part of “story” of the evening’s broadcast, enlarging the musical panorama covered by that particular episode. The guests stars perform without taking part in the competition, singing their greatest hits and engaging in duets with the younger singers.

The show assembles a large group of children (e.g. 35 boys and girls aged 7 to 15 for the autumn 2010 season). The young singers are selected from among the leading students of today’s most prestigious music schools. They are assigned songs as solos, duets, and trios; they sing some songs all together as an ensemble. They may also perform with the show's guests. A 30-piece orchestra backs the performances.

The show is officially listed as part of "RAI Junior", but the audience includes not only young people but also their parents and grandparents who enjoy hearing these songs. “TLUC” serves as a perfect link in the “musical chain” that connects the great sings of yesteryear with the magnificent voices of the performers of tomorrow.

Further enriching the program are anecdotes and little know facts on the songs covered in the competition, revealed by established singers, composers, actors and celebrities from the world of entertainment, with the additional contribution of commentary and filmed pieces from the period.

== Broadcast history ==
The first season was broadcast live from the Teatro Ariston in Sanremo by RAI 1 in five episodes during April and early May 2008. The performers ranged in age from 10–16 years old. Guests included Liza Minnelli, Paul Anka, and Dionne Warwick, as well as numerous Italian singing stars. Winning performance: ensemble singing "Il mio canto libero" by Lucio Battisti.

The second season was broadcast live from the Teatro Ariston in Sanremo in nine episodes in April and May 2009, the performers ranging in age from 8 to 16 years old. This was the season when producer Roberto Cenci put 14- to 15-year-old boys Gianluca Ginoble, Piero Barone, and Ignazio Boschetto together for the first time. This trio would later become IL VOLO, now popular tenor/baritone operatic-pop singers worldwide. Winning performance:

April: Gianluca Ginoble (of Il Volo) singing "Il mare calmo della sera" by Andrea Bocelli.

May: Ensemble singing "I migliori anni della nostra vita" by Renato Zero.

The third season was broadcast live from the RAI Auditorium in Naples, in nine weekly episodes beginning on 27 March 2010. The performers ranged in age from 7 to 16 years old. Winning performance: ensemble singing "Girotondo intorno al mondo" by Sergio Endrigo.

The fourth season began broadcasting live from the RAI Auditorium in Naples on 10 September 2010 and is projected to have 11 episodes, with the last one to be "La Festa". Performers ranged from 7 to 15 years old.

In July 2015, it was announced that season 8 would be the last.

== The program ==
The format was created by Roberto Cenci (director). Host: Antonella Clerici. Producers/writers are: Paolo Cucco, Giancarlo De Andreis, Fabrizio Berlincioni, Carlo Pistarino, Cecilia Tanturri, Simone De Rosa, Francesco Valitutti, Beppe Bosin. Photographic director: Ivan Pierri. The orchestra was conducted by Leonardo De Amicis.

=== The mechanism of the competition ===
The competition is structured as follows: the home audience votes for their favourite song. The young singers are not competing with each other, but simply performing the songs in the competition. There are no eliminations. The young people who perform the songs are part of the show's regular cast.

A winning performance is selected for each week's broadcast. The winners from the different weeks go up against each in a grand finale held during the last broadcast. The winner for the whole season is selected from among these finalists. There is also a Quality Jury that assigns a critics' award to one of the songs competing in each weekly broadcast.

=== The voting system ===
There are two voting systems, involving:

- the home audience
- the critics' prize.

The members of the home audience can vote their favourite cover songs as many times as they want. The song that receives the most votes wins that week’s broadcast and moves on to the final. The critics’ prize, on the other hand, is awarded by the members of the Quality Jury to the song they most admitted, based, first and foremost, on the way in which the young singer interpreted it. Both awards are presented to the performer (or the performers) of the cast who sang the song.

=== The quality jury and the critics' award ===
The jury consists of four guests from the different “worlds” of the arts and the entertainment industry. They can be reporters, singers who began their careers at a very young age, actors (who are also parents) and professionals in the field of music (a composer of songs, a musician, a music critic). Their assigned task is to vote for the best cover, based their judgment on the quality of the performance as well. They are also asked to give opinions on the young talents who perform during the evening. The critics’ award is given to one of the songs during each of the broadcasts.

== International versions ==
Country	Broadcaster	Year	Name	Presenter	Editions
Italy (original version)	Rai 1	2008–2012; 2014–2015	Ti lascio una canzone	Antonella Clerici	8
Portugal	TVI	2008–2011; 2022	Uma canção para ti	Júlia Pinheiro (1-3 edition); Manuel Luís Goucha (1-4 edition); Cristina Ferreira (4th edition); Maria Cerqueira Gomes (5th edition)	5
Turkey	ATV	2009–2012	Bir Şarkısın Sen	Erol Evgin (1-2 edition); Pınar Altuğ (1-3 edition)	3
Mexico	TV Azteca	2012–2013	La Academia Kids	Íngrid Coronado	2
Bolivia	Unitel	2015–2016	Te regalo una canción	Natalí Justiniano	1
China	CCTV-15	2012–2013	最美那首歌; That Beautiful Song	Sa Beining	1

== See also ==
- Federica Falzon
- Gaia Cauchi
- Il Volo
- Italy in the Junior Eurovision Song Contest 2015
- Lidushik
- Vincenzo Cantiello
