= Serbia in the Junior Eurovision Song Contest 2010 =

- Junior Eurovision Song Contest 2010
- Country: Serbia
- Selection process: National Final
- Selection date: 26 September 2010

Competing entry
- Song: "Čarobna noć"
- Artist: Sonja Škorić

Placement
- Final result: 3rd, 113 points

Participation chronology

Serbia was represented at the Junior Eurovision Song Contest 2010, in Minsk, Belarus. in September 2010, the Serbian radio and television broadcaster RTS held a national competition, "Dečja Pesma Evrovizije 2010" to select the Serbian entry for the contest. From ten finalists, Sonja Škorić from Minsk was selected. Her song was a ballad called Čarobna noć.

== Before Junior Eurovision ==
=== National final ===
Ten applicants competed to be selected as the representative for Serbia.

Draw	Artist	Song	Jury	Televote		Total	Place
Draw	Artist	Song	Jury	Votes	Points	Total	Place
1	Marija Gligorević	"Vera u sebe" (Вера у себе)	5	51	1	6	8
2	Boško Baloš	"Kap po kap" (Кап по кап)	10	259	7	17	3
3	Sofija Šašić	"Kralj provoda" (Краљ провода)	4	133	5	9	6
4	Anđela Išić	"Exit za ljubav" (Егзит за љубав)	7	115	3	10	5
5	Boris Subotić	"Do moje klupe" (До моје клупе)	8	343	10	18	2
6	Sonja Škorić	"Čarobna noć" (Чаробна ноћ)	12	345	12	24	1
7	Đorđe Marković	"Rok je..." (Рок је...)	6	148	6	12	4
8	Teodora Vujić	"Reči tišine" (Речи тишине)	2	130	4	6	9
9	Mia i Pavle	"Žmurke" (Жмурке)	1	323	8	9	7
10	Milica Savić	"Kao u snu" (Као у сну)	3	72	2	5	10

== Sonja Škorić ==
Sonja Škorić (born 1996, Pančevo) from Belgrade represented Serbia at Junior Eurovision Song Contest in 2010. Skoric began singing lessons at age five years. In 2002, at age six years, she placed first at the "Raspevano proleće" festival.

== At Junior Eurovision ==
During the allocation draw on 14 October 2010, Serbia was drawn to perform 4th, following Netherlands and preceding Ukraine. Serbia placed 3rd, scoring 113 points.

In Serbia, show were broadcast on RTS 2 with commentary by Duška Vučinić-Lučić. The Serbian spokesperson revealing the result of the Serbian vote was Maja Mazić who represented Serbia in 2008 contest.

=== Voting ===
Points awarded to Serbia
Score	Country
12 points (Note: All countries received one set of 12 points to ensure no country finished with nul points.)	Macedonia; Moldova
10 points	Belarus; Latvia; Netherlands
8 points	Malta; Sweden
7 points	Belgium; Russia; Ukraine
6 points	Lithuania
5 points	
4 points	
3 points	Armenia
2 points	
1 point	Georgia

Points awarded by Serbia
Score	Country
12 points	Macedonia
10 points	Georgia
8 points	Russia
7 points	Netherlands
6 points	Armenia
5 points	Belgium
4 points	Lithuania
3 points	Malta
2 points	Sweden
1 point	Moldova
