= Junior Eurovision Song Contest 2010 =

International song competition for youth

- Feel the Magic

Date and venue
- Final: 20 November 2010
- Venue: Minsk Arena; Minsk, Belarus

Organisation
- Organiser: European Broadcasting Union (EBU)
- Executive supervisor: Svante Stockselius

Production
- Host broadcaster: Belarusian Television and Radio Company (BTRC)
- Director: Daniel Jelinek
- Executive producer: Alexander Martynenko
- Presenters: Denis Kourian; Leila Ismailava

Participants
- Number of entries: 14
- Debuting countries: Moldova
- Returning countries: Latvia; Lithuania
- Non-returning countries: Cyprus; Romania
- Participation map: Competing countries Countries that participated in the past but not in 2010

Vote
- Voting system: Each country awards 12, 10, 8–1 points to their 10 favourite songs.
- Winning song: Armenia "Mama"

The Junior Eurovision Song Contest 2010 was the eighth edition of the Junior Eurovision Song Contest, held on 20 November 2010 at the Minsk Arena in Minsk, Belarus, and presented by Denis Kourian and Leila Ismailava. It was organised by the European Broadcasting Union (EBU) and host broadcaster the Belarusian Television and Radio Company (BTRC). Broadcasters from fourteen countries participated in the contest.

The winner was Armenia with the song "Mama" by Vladimir Arzumanyan. This gave Armenia its first Junior Eurovision victory and its first victory in any Eurovision contest.

== Location ==
Locations of the bidding countries. The eliminated countries are marked in red. The chosen host country is marked in blue.

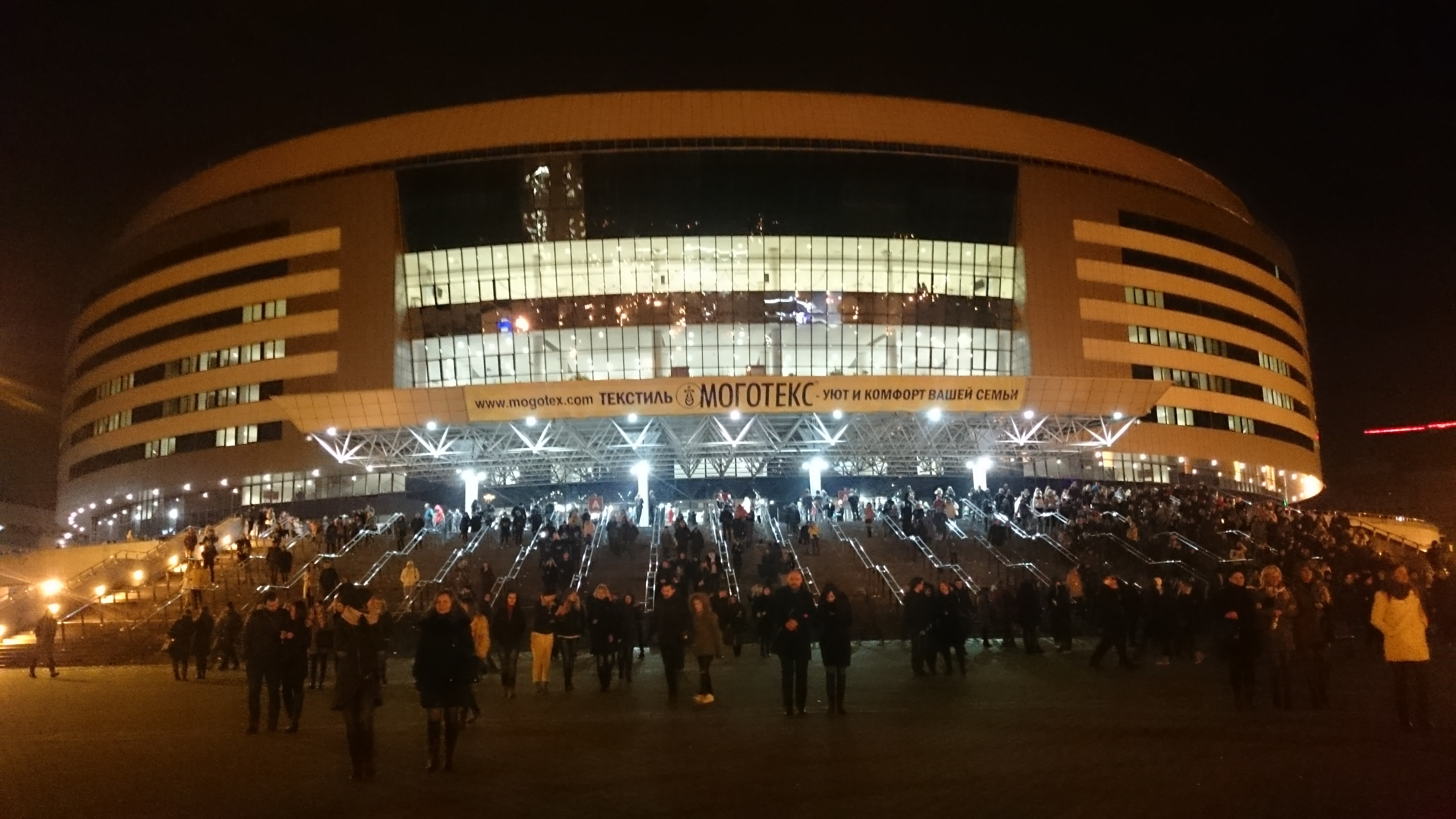
Minsk Arena, venue for the 2010 contest.

The European Broadcasting Union (EBU) invited broadcasters to bid for the rights to host the contest. In June 2009, Belarusian broadcaster National State Television and Radio Company of the Republic of Belarus (BTRC) won the rights to organise the contest over bids from Russia and Malta. EBU initially put efforts into distributing the organisation of the contest among different regions of the continent, moving away from Eastern Europe as Kyiv hosted the previous edition, with Malta's bid seemingly taking the lead. However, BTRC's detailed candidacy supported by Eurovision Song Contest 2009 winner Alexander Rybak prevailed in the end.

Under construction through 2009, the 15,000-spectator Minsk-Arena hosted the event. Belarus has twice previously won the Junior Eurovision Song Contest, which is, according to EBU Executive Supervisor Svante Stockselius, "one of Belarus' most popular television shows."

== Participants ==
Cover art of the official album

Despite originally estimating the number of participants to be between 20 and 25, on 28 July 2010 it was announced 14 countries would compete in the contest, with Moldova making its début and Latvia and Lithuania returning. Cyprus and Romania withdrew from the contest.

Sweden returned to the contest through Sveriges Television (SVT) after TV4 withdrew. The EBU's coordinator of the contest, Svante Stockselius, labelled SVT's return to the contest as a big achievement in terms of negotiations with possible participants and expressed hope that other Scandinavian broadcasters may also return to the show. Also, a special documentary "Kids of Eurovision" was filmed by BTRC about them.

Prior to the event, a digital compilation album featuring all the songs from the 2010 contest, along with karaoke versions, was put together by the European Broadcasting Union and released by Universal Music Group on 19 November 2010.

Participants of the Junior Eurovision Song Contest 2010
Country	Broadcaster	Artist	Song	Language (Note: The rules stated that the participants must sing in one of their national languages, however they were permitted to have up to 25% in a different language, as seen in some entries.)	Songwriter(s)
Armenia	AMPTV	Vladimir Arzumanyan	"Mama" (Մամա)	Armenian	Vladimir Arzumanyan
Belarus	BTRC	Daniil Kozlov	"Muzyki svet" (Музыки свет)	Russian	Daniil Kozlov
Belgium	VRT	Jill and Lauren	"Get Up!"	Dutch, English	Lauren De Ruyck; Peter Gillis; Jill Van Vooren; Alain Vande Putte; Miguel Wiels
Georgia	GPB	Mariam Kakhelishvili	"Mari Dari"	Imaginary (Note: Contains some phrases in Georgian)	Mariam Kakhelishvili; Giorgi "Giga" Kukhianidze
Latvia	LTV	Šarlote Lēnmane	"Viva la Dance (Dejo tā)"	Latvian	Šarlote Lēnmane; Arturs Palkevics; Guntars Racs
Lithuania	LRT	Bartas	"Oki Doki"	Lithuanian	Nojus "Bartas" Bartaška; Rūta Lukoševičiūtė; Arvydas "Vudis" Martinėnas
Macedonia	MRT	Anja Veterova	"Еооо, Еооо"	Macedonian	Anja Veterova
Malta	TVM	Nicole Azzopardi	"Knock Knock!....Boom! Boom!"	English, Maltese	Nicole Azzopardi
Moldova	TRM	Ștefan Roșcovan	"Ali Baba"	Romanian, English	Nicolae Caragia; Daniela Doroftei; Stefanel Roscovan
Netherlands	AVRO	Anna and Senna	"My Family"	Dutch, English	Anna Lagerweij; Tjeerd P. Oosterhuis; Senna Sitalsing
Russia	VGTRK	Sasha Lazin and Liza Drozd	"Boy and Girl"	Russian (Note: Contains two phrases in English)	Liza Drozd; Sasha Lazin
Serbia	RTS	Sonja Škorić	"Čarobna noć" (Чаробна ноћ)	Serbian	Sonja Škorić
Sweden	SVT	Josefine Ridell	"Allt jag vill ha"	Swedish	Johan Bejerholm; Thomas G:son; Arash Labaf; Josefine Ridell; Robert Uhlmann
Ukraine	NTU	Yulia Gurska	"Mii litak" (Мій літак)	Ukrainian	Yulia Gurska; Andrii Marusich

== Format ==
=== Visual design ===
The theme art for the contest was revealed on 8 April 2010, consisting of multi-coloured circles, symbolising "different people, cultures and countries," that form the shape of wings, that symbolise "freedom, ease of flying, creative inspiration and rising above." On 8 September, the mascots of the show were presented, being a bear and a wisent.

The stage, designed by Swedish stage designer Ulf Mårtensson, was unveiled on 15 July 2010, featuring five constructions in the shapes of wings. The hosts were also involved with each performance on their own dedicated section of the stage.

Theme art was also incorporated in the promotional billboards and posters featuring 11 "faces of Junior Eurovision" selected through casting procedure. Results of castings were revealed on 20 July 2010 and the 11 chosen ones were Belarusian TV personalities Denis Kourian, Olga Barabanschikova, Irina Kazantseva, Andrey Bibikov, former JESC entrants Alexey Zhigalkovich, Ksenia Sitnik, Yuriy Demidovich, Alina Molosh, Daria Nadina as well as non-professionals Yulia Brazhinskaya and Ilya Ilmursky.

=== Presenters ===
On 6 September 2010, it was announced that Denis Kourian and Leila Ismailava would host the eighth edition of the contest.

== Contest overview ==
The event took place on 20 November 2010 at 21:15 MSK (20:15 CET). Fourteen countries participated, with the running order published on 14 October 2010. All the countries competing were eligible to vote with the jury and televote. Armenia won with 120 points, with Russia, Serbia, Georgia, and Belarus completing the top five. Latvia, Sweden, Macedonia, Malta, and Ukraine occupied the bottom five positions.

The show was opened with "Hello, Eurovision" performed by former Belarusian winners Ksenia Sitnik and Alexey Zhigalkovich. The interval acts included "Europe's Skies" performed by Alexander Rybak, all participants and Dmitry Koldun performing the specially-commissioned UNICEF song "A Day Without War", and all winners of Junior Eurovision Song Contest at the time: Dino Jelusić, María Isabel, Ksenia Sitnik, The Tolmachevy Twins, Alexey Zhigalkovich, Bzikebi and Ralf Mackenbach, who performed a remixed medley of their winning entries and later presented the trophy to the winner at the end of the show.

R/O	Country	Artist	Song	Points	Place
1	Lithuania	Bartas	"Oki Doki"	67	6
2	Moldova	Ștefan Roșcovan	"Ali Baba"	54	8
3	Netherlands	Anna and Senna	"My Family"	52	9
4	Serbia	Sonja Škorić	"Čarobna noć"	113	3
5	Ukraine	Yulia Gurska	"Mii litak"	28	14
6	Sweden	Josefine Ridell	"Allt jag vill ha"	48	11
7	Russia	Sasha Lazin and Liza Drozd	"Boy and Girl"	119	2
8	Latvia	Šarlote Lēnmane	"Viva la Dance (Dejo tā)"	51	10
9	Belgium	Jill and Lauren	"Get Up!"	61	7
10	Armenia	Vladimir Arzumanyan	"Mama"	120	1
11	Malta	Nicole Azzopardi	"Knock Knock!....Boom! Boom!"	35	13
12	Belarus	Daniil Kozlov	"Muzyki svet"	85	5
13	Georgia	Mariam Kakhelishvili	"Mari Dari"	109	4
14	Macedonia	Anja Veterova	"Еооо, Еооо"	38	12

== Detailed voting results ==
Each country gave their votes through a 50% jury and 50% televoting system, which decided their top ten songs using the points 12, 10, 8, 7, 6, 5, 4, 3, 2, and 1.

Detailed voting results
		Total score	Lithuania	Moldova	Netherlands	Serbia	Ukraine	Sweden	Russia	Latvia	Belgium	Armenia	Malta	Belarus	Georgia	Macedonia
Contestants	Lithuania	67		2	2	4	4	4	6	6	5	4		6	10	2
Contestants	Moldova	54	1			1		2	5	2	6	7	10	2	6	
Contestants	Netherlands	52	2			7	1	3		3	10	5		1	8	
Contestants	Serbia	113	6	12	10		7	8	7	10	7	3	8	10	1	12
Contestants	Ukraine	28							4			1	2		4	5
Contestants	Sweden	48	3		4	2	3		2	4	8	2	1	4		3
Contestants	Russia	119	10	7	8	8	8	10		8	4	12	12	12	7	1
Contestants	Latvia	51	8	8	6		5	1			1		5		5	
Contestants	Belgium	61	5	3	12	5		6	1				4	3	2	8
Contestants	Armenia	120	7	10	5	6	12	12	12	5	12		6	8	3	10
Contestants	Malta	35		4	1	3						6		5		4
Contestants	Belarus	85	4	6	3		6		10	12		10	3		12	7
Contestants	Georgia	109	12	5	7	10	10	7	8	7	3	8	7	7		6
Contestants	Macedonia	38		1		12	2	5	3	1	2					

=== 12 points ===
Below is a summary of all 12 points received. All countries were given 12 points at the start of voting to ensure that no country finished with nul points.

N.	Contestant	Nation(s) giving 12 points
4	Armenia	Belgium, Russia, Sweden, Ukraine
3	Russia	Armenia, Belarus, Malta
2	Serbia	Macedonia, Moldova
2	Belarus	Georgia, Latvia
1	Belgium	Netherlands
1	Georgia	Lithuania
1	Macedonia	Serbia

=== Spokespersons ===
The order in which votes were cast during the 2010 contest along with the spokesperson who was responsible for announcing the votes for their respective country.

1. Lithuania – Bernardas Garbačiauskas
2. Moldova – Paula Paraschiv
3. Netherlands – Bram
4. Serbia – Maja Mazić
5. Ukraine – Elizabeth Arfush
6. Sweden – Robin Ridell
7. Russia – Philip Mazurov
8. Latvia – Ralfs Eilands
9. Belgium – Laura Omloop
10. Armenia – Nadia Sargsyan
11. Malta – Francesca Zarb
12. Belarus – Anastasiya Butyugina
13. Georgia – Giorgi Toradze
14. Macedonia – Sara Markoska

== Broadcasts ==
Each national broadcaster also sent a commentator to the contest, in order to provide coverage of the contest in their own native language. Details of the commentators and the broadcasting station for which they represented are also included in the table below.

Broadcasters and commentators in participating countries
Country	Broadcaster(s)	Channel(s)	Commentator(s)	Ref.
Armenia	AMPTV	Armenia 1	Gohar Gasparyan and Artak Vandanyan	
Belarus	BTRC	Belarus 1, Belarus 24	Pavel Lazovik	
Belgium	VRT	Eén, Ketnet	Kristien Maes and Tom De Cock	
Georgia	GPB	1TV	Temo Kvirkvelia	
Latvia	LTV	LTV1	Valters Frīdenbergs	
Lithuania	LRT	LTV	Darius Užkuraitis	
Macedonia	MKRTV	MTV 1	Toni Drenkovski and Monika Todorovska	
Malta	PBS	TVM	Eileen Montesin	
Moldova	TRM	Moldova 1	Rusalina Rusu	
Netherlands	AVRO	Nederland 3	Sipke Jan Bousema	
Russia	VGTRK	Russia-1	Olga Shelest	
Serbia	RTS	RTS2, RTS Sat	Duška Vučinić-Lučić	
Sweden	SVT	SVT24	Edward af Sillén and Malin Olsson	
Ukraine	Suspilne	Pershyi	Timur Miroshnychenko	

Broadcasters and commentators in non-participating countries
Country	Broadcaster(s)	Channel	Commentator(s)	Ref.
Australia	SBS	SBS One	No commentary	
Azerbaijan	İTV		Unknown	
Bosnia and Herzegovina	BHRT	BHT1 (Delayed)	Unknown	
New Zealand	Unknown			

== See also ==
- Eurovision Song Contest 2010
- Eurovision Young Musicians 2010
