= Armenia in the Junior Eurovision Song Contest 2010 =

- Junior Eurovision Song Contest 2010
- Country: Armenia
- Selection process: National Final
- Selection date: Quarter-finals: 2 September 2010; 3 September 2010; Semi-final: 4 September 2010; Final: 5 September 2010

Competing entry
- Song: "Mama"
- Artist: Vladimir Arzumanyan

Placement
- Final result: 1st, 120 points

Participation chronology

Armenia selected their Junior Eurovision Song Contest 2010 entry by a national final. The winner was Vladimir Arzumanyan with "Mama", which represented Armenia in the Junior Eurovision Song Contest 2010 on 20 November 2010. The song was produced by Canadian-Armenian music producer DerHova, who also composed and produced Sirusho's Qele, Qele.

== Before Junior Eurovision ==
=== National final ===
A submission period for artists was held until 5 August 2010. 31 entries were received, and 25 entries were chosen for the national final.

==== Quarter-final 1 ====
The first quarter-final was held on 2 September 2010, hosted by Anahit Sargsyan and Artak Vardanyan. Twelve songs competed and the top eight advanced to the semi-final based on the votes from an "expert" jury.

Quarter-final 1 – 2 September 2010
Draw	Artist	Song	Place
1	Inessa Sahakyan	"Ari indz het"	—
2	Vahagn Grigoryan	"Vrum-vrum"	4
3	Zangak	"Evratesil"	—
4	Ninela	"Chalo shunik"	8
5	Ara Balayan	"Hrashqneri ashxarhamas"	—
6	Razmik Aghajanyan	"Vor lini"	1
7	Masis Minasyan	"Ergeq indz het"	2
8	Zinaida Meliqyan & Karina	"Erazanq"	—
9	Heghine Hayrapetyan	"Im poqrik enkere"	7
10	Dalita	"Jraharsi erge"	3
11	Aliqner	"Qami"	5
12	Hayk Melqonyan	"Im erkir Hayastan"	6

==== Quarter-final 2 ====
The second quarter-final was held on 3 September 2010, hosted by Anahit Sargsyan and Artak Vardanyan. Thirteen songs competed and the top eight advanced to the semi-final based on the votes from an "expert" jury.

Quarter-final 2 – 3 September 2010
Draw	Artist	Song	Place
1	Vladimir Arzumanyan	"Mama"	1
2	Ekeq Ergenq	"Hamakargich"	—
3	Meri Grigoryan	"Bemn im teghn e"	5
4	Anzhelika Barseghyan	"Voghjuyn"	—
5	Anahit Sahakyan	"Molorake dzaynakcum e mez"	—
6	Erna Maruqyan	"Heqiatayin qaghaq"	6
7	Nona Avagyan	"Poqreri ton"	7
8	Mane Barseghyan	"Qez het im erg"	4
9	Lidushik & Meri Grigoryan	"Hay arev"	2
10	Vergine Bekchyan	"Charachchin"	—
11	Mariam Karapetyan	"Khaghaghutyan koch"	—
12	Do-Re-Mi	"Pop Star"	2
13	Anush Melqonyan	"Aghjikneri molorake"	8

==== Semi-final ====
The semi-final was held on 4 September 2010, hosted by Anahit Sargsyan and Artak Vardanyan. Sixteen songs competed and the top ten advanced to the final based on the votes from an "expert" jury.

Semi-final – 4 September 2010
Draw	Artist	Song	Place
1	Erna Maruqyan	"Heqiatayin qaghaq"	—
2	Ninela	"Chalo shunik"	—
3	Lidushik & Meri Grigoryan	"Hay arev"	3
4	Meri Grigoryan	"Bemn im teghn e"	9
5	Dalita	"Jraharsi erge"	7
6	Hayk Melqonyan	"Im erkir Hayastan"	—
7	Aliqner	"Qami"	8
8	Mane Barseghyan	"Qez het im erg"	—
9	Masis Minasyan	"Ergeq indz het"	5
10	Vahagn Grigoryan	"Vrum-vrum"	6
11	Razmik Aghajanyan	"Vor lini"	2
12	Nona Avagyan	"Poqreri ton"	—
13	Vladimir Arzumanyan	"Mama"	1
14	Do-Re-Mi	"Pop Star"	4
15	Anush Melqonyan	"Aghjikneri molorake"	10
~~16~~	~~Heghine Hayrapetyan~~	~~"Im poqrik enkere"~~	—

==== Final ====
The final was held on 5 September 2010, hosted by Anahit Sargsyan and Artak Vardanyan. Ten songs competed and the winner was chosen by a 50/50 combination of televoting and the votes from an "expert" jury.

Final – 5 September 2010
Draw	Artist	Song	Jury	Televote	Total	Place
1	Meri Grigoryan	"Bemn im teghn e"	3	1	4	10
2	Razmik Aghajanyan	"Vor lini"	8	8	16	4
3	Lidushik & Meri Grigoryan	"Hay arev"	5	12	17	2
4	Masis Minasyan	"Ergeq indz het"	7	10	17	3
5	Anush Melqonyan	"Aghjikneri molorake"	2	4	6	8
6	Dalita	"Jraharsi erge"	6	2	8	7
7	Vladimir Arzumanyan	"Mama"	12	6	18	1
8	Do-Re-Mi	"Pop Star"	10	5	15	5
9	Aliqner	"Qami"	1	3	4	9
10	Vahagn Grigoryan	"Vrum-vrum"	4	7	11	6

== At Junior Eurovision ==
=== Voting ===
Points awarded to Armenia
Score	Country
12 points (Note: All countries received one set of 12 points to ensure no country finished with nul points.)	Belgium; Russia; Sweden; Ukraine
10 points	Macedonia; Moldova
8 points	Belarus
7 points	Lithuania
6 points	Malta; Serbia
5 points	Latvia; Netherlands
4 points	
3 points	Georgia
2 points	
1 point	

Points awarded by Armenia
Score	Country
12 points	Russia
10 points	Belarus
8 points	Georgia
7 points	Moldova
6 points	Malta
5 points	Netherlands
4 points	Lithuania
3 points	Serbia
2 points	Sweden
1 point	Ukraine
