= Paolo Cucco =

Italian TV writer and producer

Paolo Cucco (born 1973) is an Italian TV writer and producer who was born in Bergamo, (Italy). He is the creator of the final game of Raiuno’s trivia show "Il Gladiatore" (a Ballandi Entertainment production). In this game, one contestant challenged fifty people in the audience to win a prize by answering fifty questions. He created a game show with three contestants and thirteen questions for RSI (Radio Televisione Svizzera Italiana) called Spaccatredici. In this game, the contestant can ask for help via telephone three times. The show was broadcast for three years with great success and, thanks to the brilliant host Matteo Pelli, the network was relaunched. He is also editor consultant for RSI.

He wrote the adaptation of "El Legado" (Telefè Argentina) for the production company Magnolia (televisione) in Italy. This adaptation was called L'Eredità and was presented Italian host "Amadeus".

In 2004, he wrote the new edition of Il Gioco dei 9 (Hollywood Squares) which was hosted by Enrico Papi.

He was one of the producer of "L'Isola dei Famosi" 3 (Celebrity Survivor), Musicfarm 2 and 3, and Amici di Maria De Filippi 6. He is working with Italian director Roberto Cenci and a group of producers, to create "Dal Lago di Garda Stasera mi butto" for Italian television station Raiuno, 2008 and 2009 format Ti lascio una canzone (Leavin' you a song). In 2008 was one of the producer of "Volami nel cuore", a variety show of Raiuno. From 2010 is working for a talent show for Canale 5, called "Io canto" hosted by Gerry Scotti. He is producer and writer of the original format "LA GRANDE MAGIA - THE ILLUSIONIST", a talent show transmitted on Canale 5 from January 2013. In 2012 has produced and created the original game show format called "Il rompiscatole" for RSI hosted by Matteo Pelli and in 2013/14 edition by the mentalist and host Federico Soldati a 43% share TV show. He adapted for Italy the formats "Guess My Age" and "Name That Tune" hosted by Enrico Papi. In 2022, he wrote the games for the format "100% Italia." He adapted the format "The Floor" for Raidue.
