= Jas Rolyn =

Maltese singer and songwriter

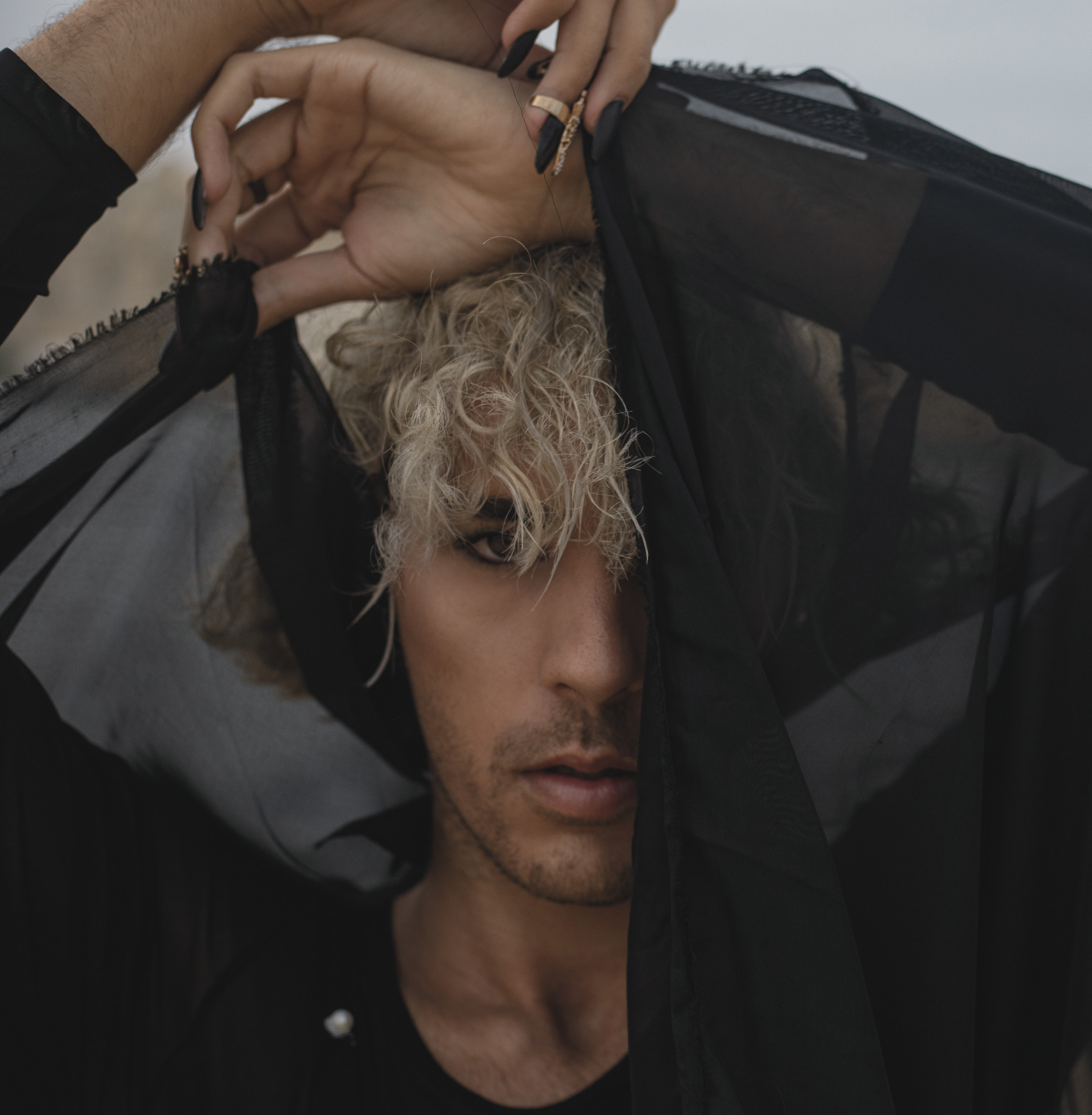

Background information
- Born: 14 October 1998 (age 27); Pieta, Malta
- Origin: Marsa, Malta
- Genres: R&B, pop, trap
- Occupations: Singer-songwriter, content creator
- Instruments: Vocals, piano
- Years active: 2005–present
- Website: www.jasrolyn.com

Jas Rolyn is a Maltese singer and songwriter. While highlighting his androgynous style, he has been performing locally and in Italy since his early teenage years.

== Early life ==
Rolyn (who is previously known as Jasmar Cassar) was born on 14 October 1998 in Pieta, Malta. Rolyn was raised by his mother.

He skipped most of his secondary school years but later in life completed post-secondary at GEM16+.

== Career ==
Jas competed in Malta's Junior Eurovision Song Contest 2008 for the first time with his Maltese song "Id-Dinja Tieghi". He came back to Malta's Junior Eurovision in 2010, when he competed in Junior Eurovision Song Contest 2010. He performed a ballad-pop track song called "My Star" where he classified in the ninth place.

In 2013, Rolyn competed abroad in the Italian festival Sanremo, where he placed second. In the same year, he competed in the Maltese festival Kanzunetta Indipendenza with the song "Muzika" (written by Minik and Rita Pace) with a classic-pop-disco song, where he emphasized on his falsetto vocals.

In 2014 he competed and won the Singer/Songwriter in the category in the Italian festival Il-Cantagiro with his own song "Ti Amo, I Love You".

In 2015, Jas Rolyn teamed up with four other local singers, and competed as the group L-Ilħna with the original gospel song "Qalbien" in the Maltese Festival Għanja Gmiel Is-Seba' Noti (organised by Erseb Productions). The group won 1st place, Best Presentation and the Overall Trophy.

Rolyn released his first official single "Just Be" – which he composed – on 2 September 2015. The track was written by Matt 'Muxu' Mercieca, mixed and mastered by Cyprian Cassar (former member of Tenishia). Just Be was released on YouTube accompanied by a video clip directed and produced by Jas Rolyn.

On 10 June 2016, Rolyn released his second single "When Love Comes Around", a pop love song which he composed - accompanied by a music video - which he also directed and produced. In this single, Rolyn shows his bright personality by dancing and cheering with his schoolmates.

Later on in July, together with his sister Shyli Rose and the duo K13, Cassar performed live with the orchestra and competed in the Semi-Final of L-Għanja tal-Poplu, with their hip-hop track "Tama" (hope) which was co-written by Jas Rolyn.

On 14 October 2016, Rolyn released his 3rd single "On The Run". Rolyn's single spent 6 weeks in the MVTV's Top 20, reaching its highest spot #11 on 5 November.

Jas Rolyn was featured on the track Summer Nights which was produced by the Turkish producer MobBeatz. The track was first released in digital stores on 10 July 2017. A lyric video also followed the release on 16 August.

In 2018, Rolyn released his 4th single Hadd Ma Jaf which was penned and composed by Rolyn himself. Hadd Ma Jaf was released on 11 June 2018.

On 4 February 2019, Jas released a video in memory of his best friend, who died one year before. Later on, on 3 March, the Just Be singer released an emotional short film featuring One Last Time.

2019 also marks the year of Jas Rolyn's debut album release. On 14 April 2019, Rolyn released his debut record Journey To Freedom alongside the music video of Chained (ft. Shyli Rose).

In 2021, Jas Rolyn re-branded and stopped performing under his birth name (Jasmar Cassar). He later on released his first single since 2019. Bittersweet was released on May 5, 2021.

== Discography ==
ALBUMS
Title	Artist(s)	Genre	Release date
Journey To Freedom	Jas Rolyn	Pop	14 April 2019

SINGLES
Title	Artist(s)	Release date	Writer(s)	Producer(s)	Album
Just Be	Jas Rolyn	2 September 2015	Jas Rolyn, Muxu	Cyprian Cassar	Journey To Freedom
When Love Comes Around	Jas Rolyn	10 June 2016	Jas Rolyn, Muxu	Cyprian Cassar	Journey To Freedom
On The Run	Jas Rolyn	14 October 2016	Jas Rolyn, Muxu	Cyprian Cassar	Journey To Freedom
Summer Nights	MobBeatz Ft. Jas Rolyn	11 July 2017	MobBeatz	MobBeatz	—
Hadd Ma Jaf	Jas Rolyn	11 June 2018	Jas Rolyn	Cyprian Cassar	Journey To Freedom
I Love You So	Jas Rolyn	4 February 2019	Jas Rolyn	Jas Rolyn	Journey To Freedom
Chained	Jas Rolyn Ft. Shyli Rose	14 April 2019	Jas Rolyn, Sacha Cassar, Shyli Rose	Jas Rolyn	Journey To Freedom
Bittersweet	Jas Rolyn Ft. Trapboi VIII	5 May 2021	Jas Rolyn, Trapboi VIII	YoungAsko	—
