= Malta in the Junior Eurovision Song Contest 2010 =

- Junior Eurovision Song Contest 2010
- Country: Malta
- Selection process: Junior Eurosong 2010
- Selection date: 4 September 2010

Competing entry
- Song: "Knock Knock!...Boom! Boom!"
- Artist: Nicole Azzopardi

Placement
- Final result: 13th, 35 points

Participation chronology

Malta selected their Junior Eurovision entry for 2010 through Junior Eurosong, a national final consisting of 20 songs. The winner was Nicole Azzopardi, with the song "Knock Knock!...Boom! Boom!"

Azzopardi competed for Malta at the Junior Eurovision Song Contest 2010, held on 20 November in Minsk, Belarus, finishing 13th out of 14 entries.

== Before Junior Eurovision ==
=== Junior Eurosong 2010 ===
The final took place on 4 September 2010. Twenty entries competed and the votes of a six-member jury panel (6/7) and the results of public televoting (1/7) determined the winner.

The six members of the jury that evaluated the entries during the final consisted of:

- Fr. Karm Debattista
- Joe Gatt
- Jacqueline Delicata
- Francesca Aquilina
- Marouska Muscat
- Joseph Refalo

Draw	Artist	Song	Place
1	Melissa Fausel-Attard	"Sailor Girl"	13
2	Jasmar Cassar	"My Star"	9
3	Althea Georgiovan Troisi De Menville	"Crazy Seasons"	16
4	Michela Galea	"Play For Me"	17
5	Elaine Haber	"Maestro"	6
6	Sarah Bonnici	"Kitty Kitty Cat"	7
7	Ylenia Vella	"Shout It Out"	3
8	Domenique Azzopardi	"Jigsaw Puzzle"	12
9	Jade Marie Vella	"Hooked On Samba"	11
10	Mikaela Agius	"Wonderland of Dreams"	15
11	Antoine Farrugia & Kayleigh Cassar	"It’s Time"	5
12	Maxine Pace	"Lady Lady Ga Ga"	8
13	Maria Debono	"One Flag"	18
14	Nicole Azzopardi	"Knock Knock!....Boom! Boom!"	1
15	Jodie Farrugia	"Fantazija"	4
16	Maria Christina Desira & Justine Delmar	"Love To Share"	2
17	Kimberly Micallef	"Indian Girl"	14
18	Courtney Farrugia	"So Sweet"	20
19	M Five	"Happy Day"	10
20	Nicole Marie Vella	"Let the Colours Shine"	19

== At Junior Eurovision ==
=== Voting ===
Points awarded to Malta
Score	Country
12 points (Note: All countries received one set of 12 points to ensure no country finished with nul points.)	
10 points	
8 points	
7 points	
6 points	Armenia
5 points	Belarus
4 points	Macedonia; Moldova
3 points	Serbia
2 points	
1 point	Netherlands

Points awarded by Malta
Score	Country
12 points	Russia
10 points	Moldova
8 points	Serbia
7 points	Georgia
6 points	Armenia
5 points	Latvia
4 points	Belgium
3 points	Belarus
2 points	Ukraine
1 point	Sweden
