= Serbia in the Junior Eurovision Song Contest =

- Junior Eurovision Song Contest
- Participating broadcaster: Radio Television of Serbia (RTS)

Participation summary
- Appearances: 14
- First appearance: 2006
- Last appearance: 2022
- Highest placement: 3rd: 2007, 2010
- Participation history: 2006; 2007; 2008; 2009; 2010; 2011 – 2013; 2014; 2015; 2016; 2017; 2018; 2019; 2020; 2021; 2022; 2023 – 2025
- For the most recent participation see Serbia in the Junior Eurovision Song Contest 2022

Serbia has been represented at the Junior Eurovision Song Contest since 2006. The Serbian participating broadcaster in the contest is Radio Television of Serbia (RTS). The broadcaster used the national selection format titled Izbor za Dečju pesmu Evrovizije (Serbian Cyrillic: Избор за Дечју песму Евровизије) for its participation at the contests between 2006 and 2010.

In 2007, the country was represented by Nevena Božović, who went on to represent Serbia in the Eurovision Song Contest 2013 as part of the girl group Moje 3. Serbia's best result came in 2007 and 2010 when it finished in third place at both contests. The country was absent from the contest between 2011 and 2013, and again since 2023. Serbia returned to the competition in 2014 represented by Emilija Đonin, who was selected internally by the national broadcaster RTS, a selection mechanism that it continued to use in 2015 when it internally selected the song "Lenina pesma" (Serbian: Ленина песма), performed by Lena Stamenković.

It is one of three countries, along with Belarus and Kazakhstan, to have participated in the Junior Eurovision Song Contest before debuting in the adult one.

== History ==
Prior to the Montenegrin independence referendum in 2006 which culminated into the dissolution of Serbia and Montenegro, both nations use to compete at the Junior Eurovision Song Contest and Eurovision Song Contest as Serbia and Montenegro. Serbia were the first of the two nations to compete at a Junior Contest, making its debut at the Junior Eurovision Song Contest 2006. While it was at the Junior Eurovision Song Contest 2014 when Montenegro would make its debut as an independent nation. Neustrašivi učitelji stranih jezika went on to being Serbia's first participant in 2006 as an independent nation with the song "Učimo strane jezike" (Serbian Cyrillic: Учимо стране језике).

Serbia continued to participate at the Junior Eurovision Song Contest 2007, in which it had selected Nevena Božović to represent Serbia with the song "Piši mi" (Serbian Cyrillic: Пиши ми). Božović also became the first Junior Eurovision participant to take part in the senior Eurovision Song Contest as part of the group Moje 3, performing the song "Ljubav je svuda" (Serbian Cyrillic: Љубав је свуда), which achieved forty-six points and failing to qualify to the grand final of the Eurovision Song Contest 2013 after finishing in 11th place. However, she managed to qualify in the grand final of the Eurovision Song Contest 2019 with the song "Kruna" (Serbian Cyrillic: Круна) and finished in 18th place with 89 points.

The nation continued to participate at every Junior Contest until 2010, before announcing on 5 June 2011 that Serbia would not participate in the 2011 contest. On 25 July 2014, Serbia announced its return to the 2014 contest, after a three-year absence. Serbia selected its 2014 entry through an internal selection for the first time in its history. On 1 October 2014 it was revealed that Emilija Đonin would represent Serbia in the contest with the song "Svet u mojim očima".

On 4 May 2015, it was announced on a Eurovision news website that Serbia's national broadcaster, RTS, had not started any planning in regards to their participation at the 2015 contest, and that such decision would be taken after the Eurovision Song Contest 2015. On 20 August 2015, Serbia confirmed its participation. RTS announced on 21 September 2015, that they had internally selected Lena Stamenković with the song "Lenina pesma" (Serbian Cyrillic: Ленина песма) to represent them at the Junior Eurovision Song Contest 2015, which took place at the Arena Armeec, in the Bulgarian capital Sofia, on 21 November 2015. On 14 September 2016, Serbia confirmed its participation in the Junior Eurovision Song Contest 2016 in Valletta, Malta, with the country going on to participate in all subsequent editions until 2022.

On 1 August 2023, RTS editor-in-chief Olivera Kovačević announced that Serbia will withdraw from the Junior Eurovision Song Contest 2023 in Nice, France for financial reasons. Furthermore, Serbia announced its non-participation in the 2024 contest as well.

== Participation overview ==
Table key
3	Third place
◁	Last place

Year	Artist	Song	Language	Place	Points
2006	Neustrašivi učitelji stranih jezika	"Učimo strane jezike" (Учимо стране језике)	Serbian, English (Note: Also contains phrases in French, German, Italian, Spanish, Russian and Japanese)	5	81
2007	Nevena Božović	"Piši mi" (Пиши ми)	Serbian	3	120
2008	Maja Mazić	"Uvek kad u nebo pogledam" (Увек кад у небо погледам)	Serbian	12	37
2009	Ništa lično	"Onaj pravi" (Онај прави)	Serbian	10	34
2010	Sonja Škorić	"Čarobna noć" (Чаробна ноћ)	Serbian	3	113
2014	Emilija Đonin	"Svet u mojim očima" (Свет у мојим очима)	Serbian	10	61
2015	Lena Stamenković	"Lenina pesma" (Ленина песма)	Serbian	7	79
2016	Dunja Jeličić	"U la la la" (У ла ла ла)	Serbian	17 ◁	14
2017	Irina Brodić and Jana Paunović	"Ceo svet je naš" (Цео свет је наш)	Serbian	10	92
2018	Bojana Radovanović	"Svet" (Свет)	Serbian	19	30
2019	Darija Vračević	"Podigni glas (Raise Your Voice)" (Подигни глас)	Serbian, English	10	109
2020	Petar Aničić	"Heartbeat"	Serbian, English	11	85
2021	Jovana and Dunja	"Oči deteta (Children's Eyes)" (Очи детета)	Serbian	13	86
2022	Katarina Savić	"Svet bez granica" (Свет без граница)	Serbian	13	92

== Commentators and spokespersons ==
The table below list the details of each commentator and spokesperson since 2006.

Year	Commentator	Spokesperson	Ref.
2006	Duška Vučinić-Lučić	Milica Stanišić	
2007	Duška Vučinić-Lučić	Anđelija Erić	
2008	Duška Vučinić-Lučić	Anđelija Erić	
2009	Duška Vučinić-Lučić	Nevena Božović	
2010	Duška Vučinić-Lučić	Maja Mazić	
2011–2013	No broadcast	Did not participate	
2014	Silvana Grujić	Tamara Vasović	
2015	Silvana Grujić	Dunja Jeličić	
2016	Silvana Grujić	Tomislav Radojević	
2017	Olga Kapor and Tamara Petković	Mina Grujić	
2018	Tamara Petković	Lana Karić	
2019	Tijana Lukić	Bojana Radovanović	
2020	Tijana Lukić	Darija Vračević	
2021	Tijana Lukić	Katie	
2022	Kristina Radenković	Petar Aničić	
2023–2026	No broadcast	Did not participate	

== Gallery ==
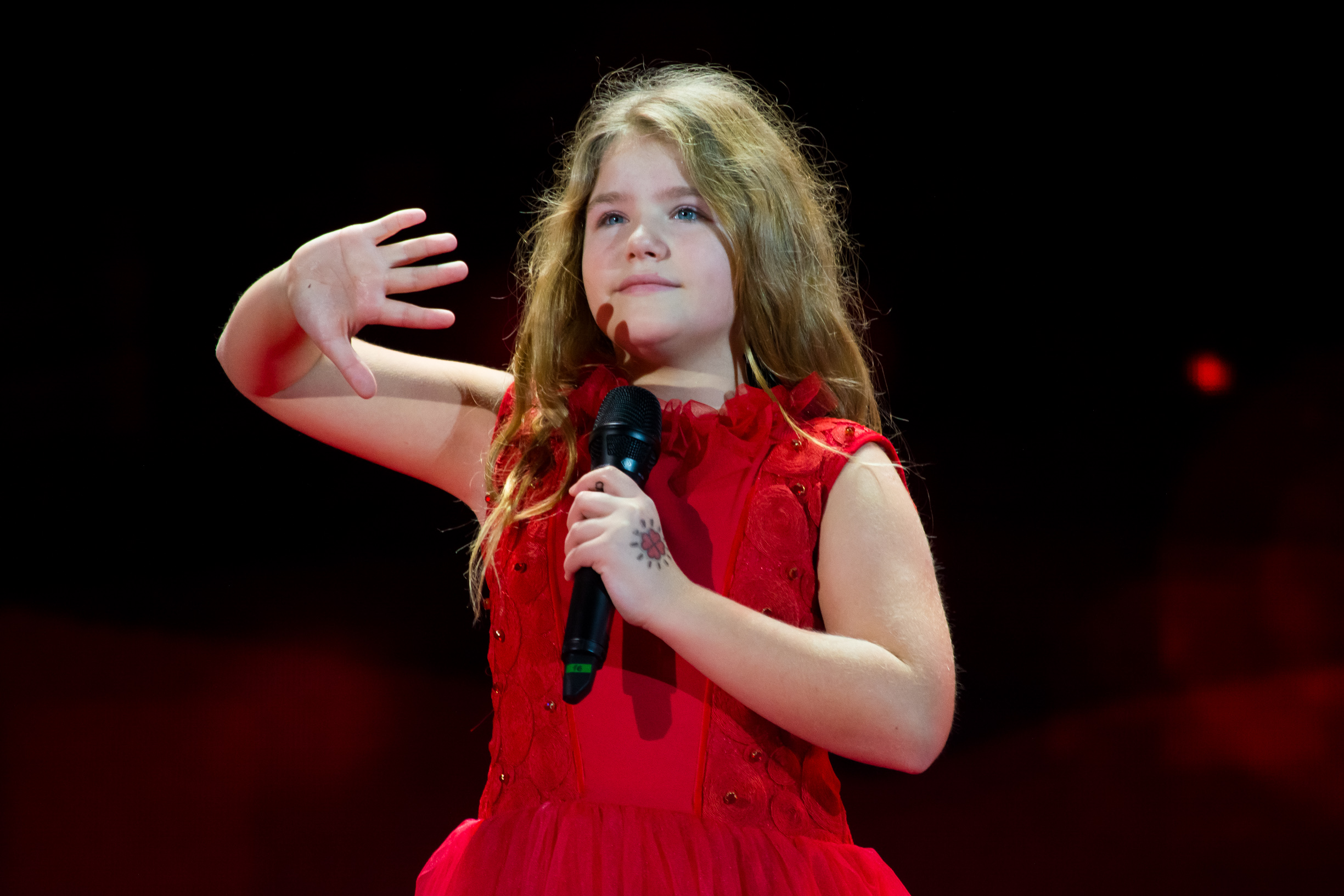
Lena Stamenković in Sofia (2015)

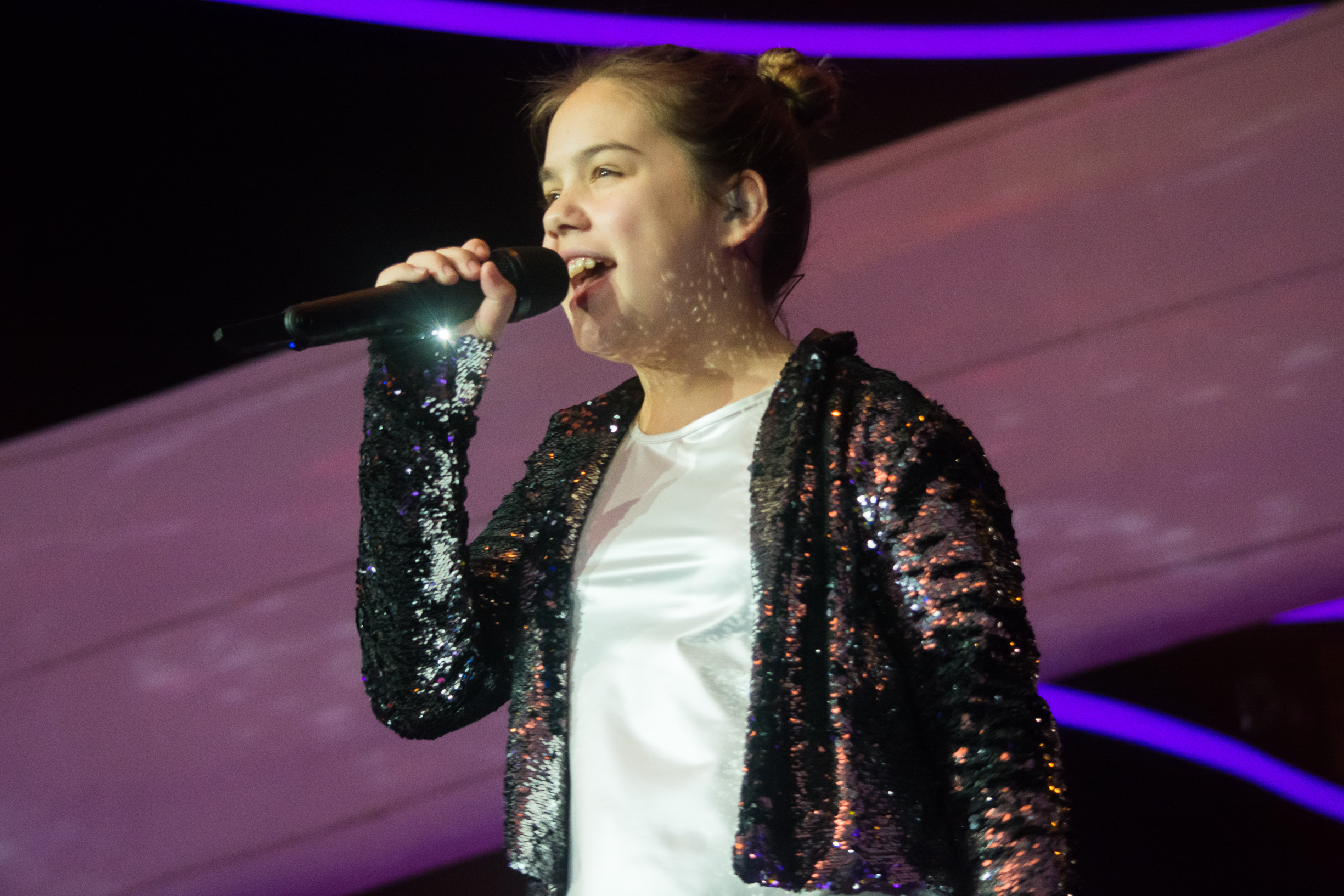
Dunja Jeličić in Valletta (2016)

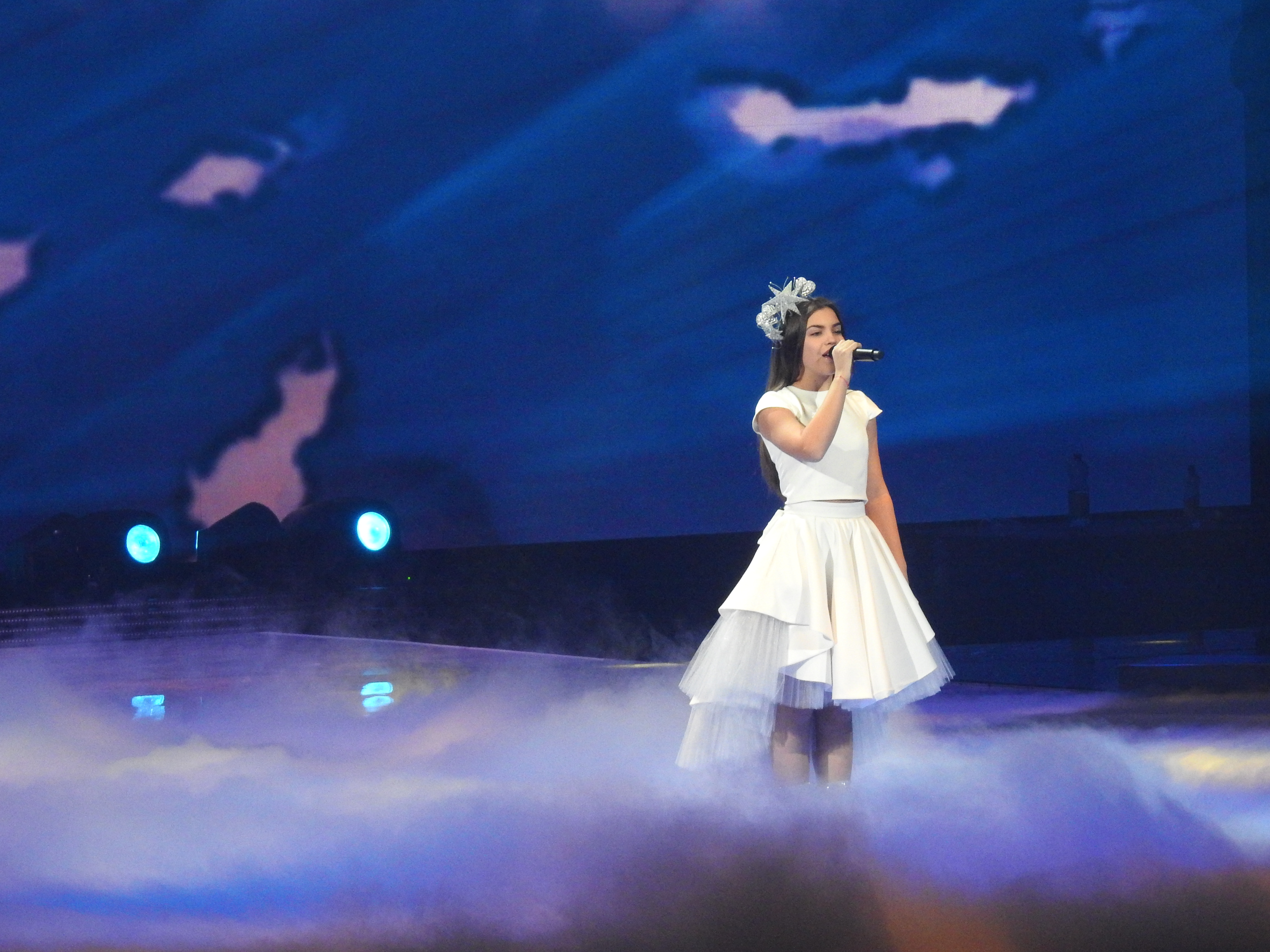
Bojana Radovanović in Minsk (2018)

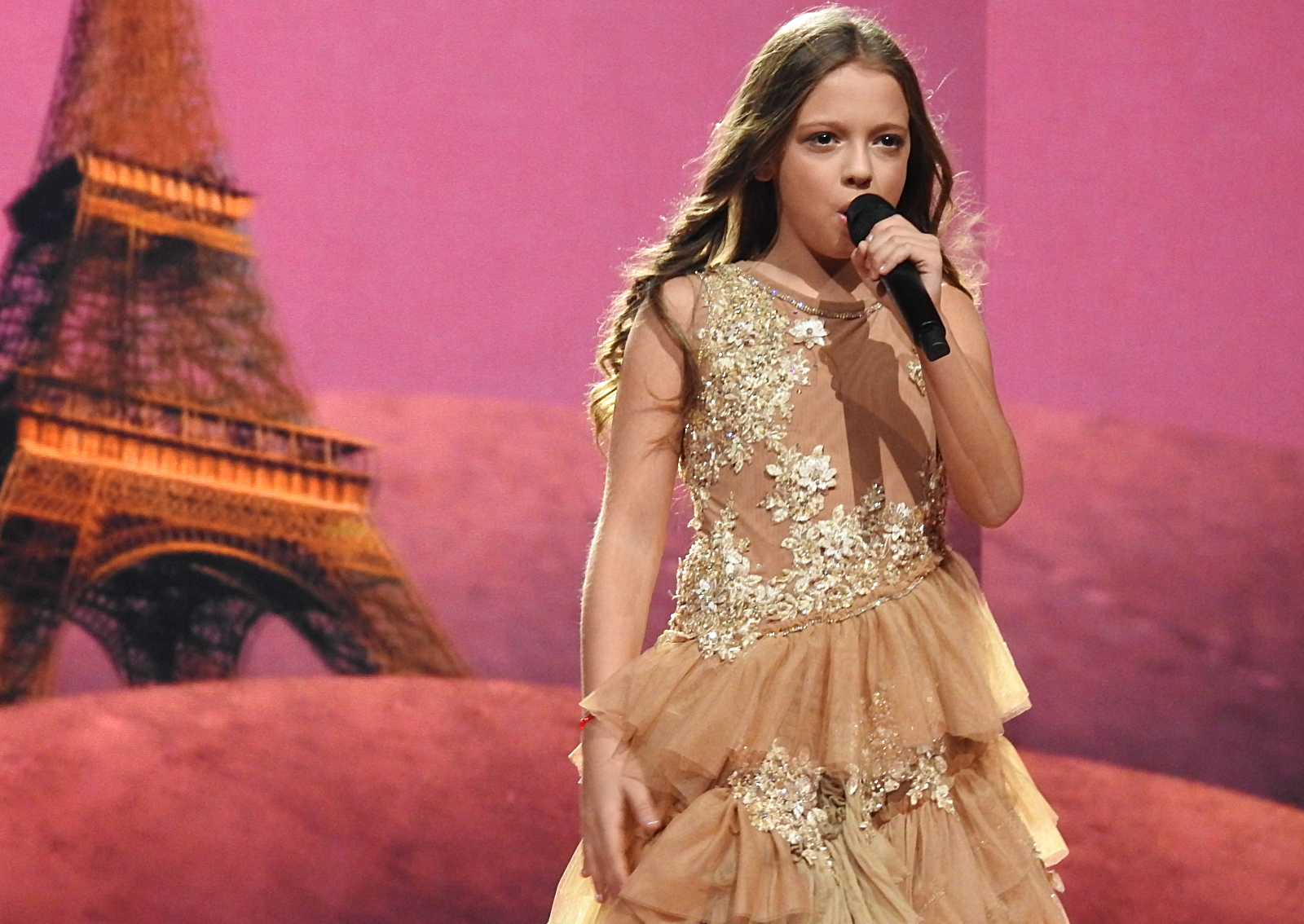
Darija Vračević in Gliwice (2019)

== See also ==
- Serbia in the Eurovision Song Contest – Senior version of the Eurovision Song Contest.
