= Vladimir Arzumanyan =

Armenian singer (born 1998)

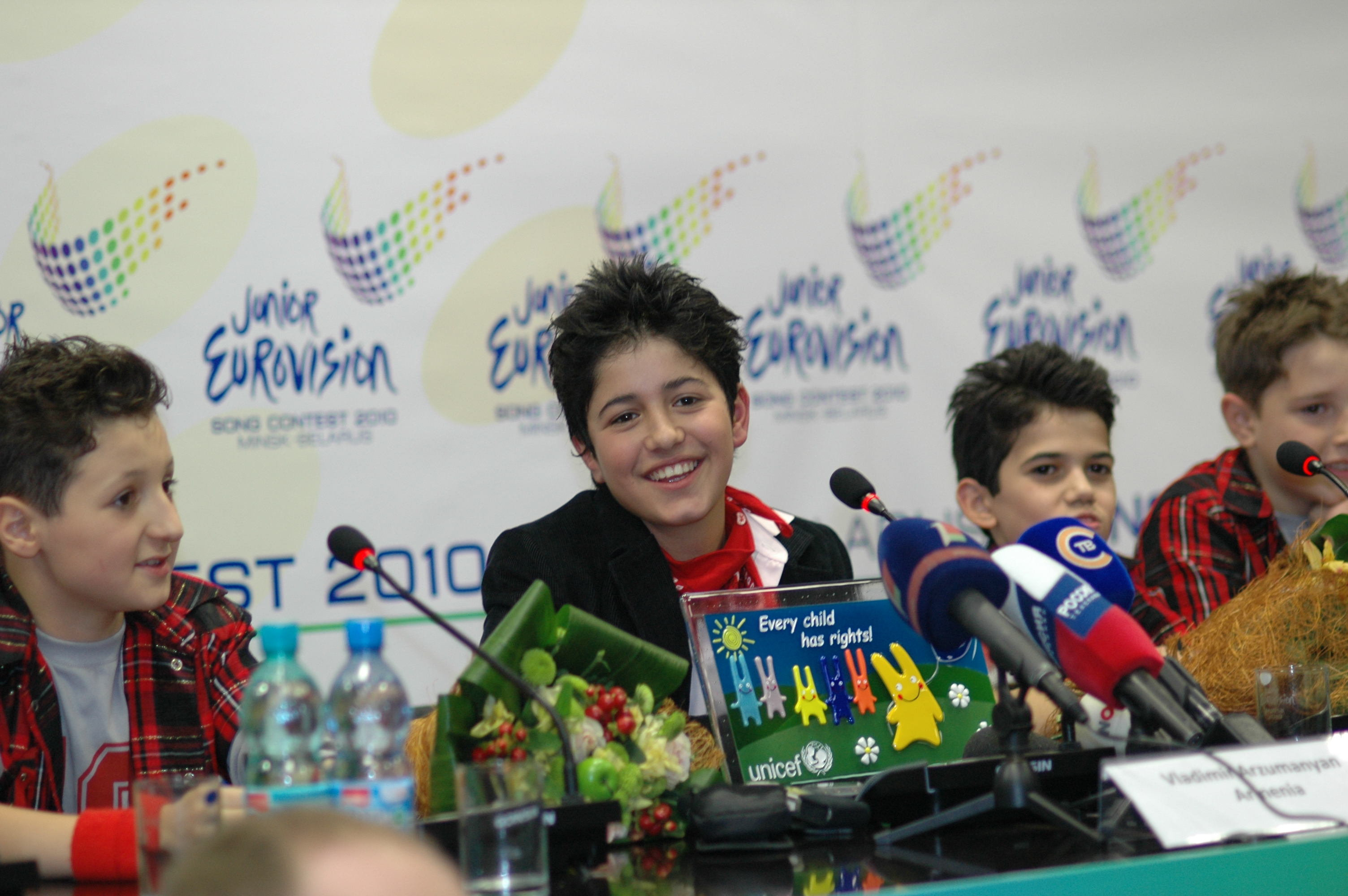
- Arzumanyan (center) in 2010

Background information
- Born: Vladimir Arzumanyan; 26 May 1998 (age 27); Stepanakert, Republic of Artsakh
- Instrument: Vocals
- Years active: 2001-present (stage); 2007-present (dancer); 2008-present (singer)

Vladimir Arzumanyan (Armenian: Վլադիմիր Արզումանյան; born 26 May 1998 in Stepanakert, Republic of Artsakh) is an Armenian singer. He represented Armenia in the Junior Eurovision Song Contest 2010 with the entry Mama (Մամա). In the final Vladimir won, becoming the first Armenian singer to have won in a Eurovision event. The song was produced by Canadian-Armenian music producer DerHova. Ten years later in 2020, he competed in the 2020 edition of Depi Evratesil, the Armenian national final for the Eurovision Song Contest.

Awards and achievements
Preceded by Luara Hayrapetyan with "Barcelona"	Armenia in the Junior Eurovision Song Contest; 2010	Succeeded by Dalita with "Welcome to Armenia"
Preceded by (Netherlands) Ralf Mackenbach with "Click Clack"	Winner of the Junior Eurovision Song Contest; 2010	Succeeded by (Georgia (country)) Candy with "Candy Music"
