= Cantagiro =

Italian summer song festival

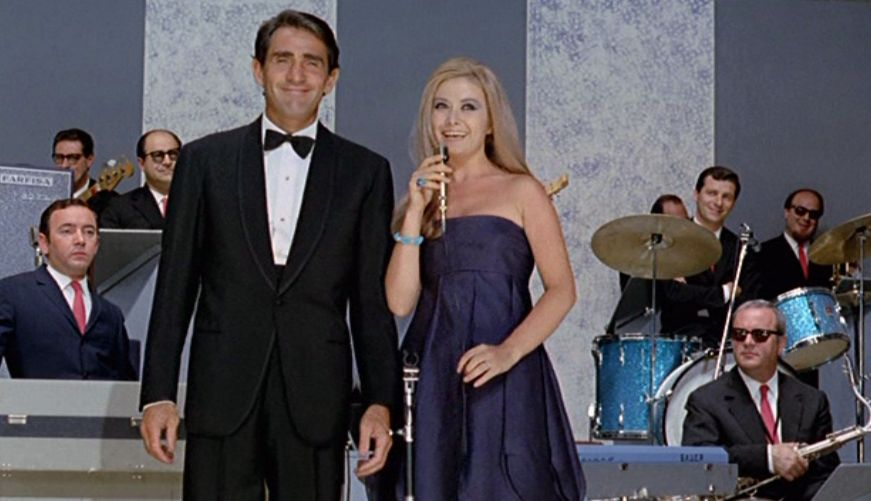
Walter Chiari and Paola Quattrini, presenters of the 1967 Cantagiro

Cantagiro was an Italian summer song contest held from 1962 to 1972 and 1990 to 1993. It featured three categories, A for famous artists, B for newcomers and C for groups. The creator of the competition was Ezio Radaelli. The name of the festival was a reference to the bicycle race Giro d'Italia, and, as the Giro, Cantagiro was organized as a stage race consisting of eleven or twelve daily stages, each set in a different city. A peculiar characteristic of the festival was that, while traveling between one stage and the other, singers were required to travel in an open car, to be at the disposal of the crowd of fans, otherwise risking fines or disqualification from the competition; accordingly the travel usually resolved into a huge crowd, with fans waiting their idols in every corner of the path.

The festival was the main subject of two musicarello films, Urlo contro melodia nel Cantagiro 1963 (1964) and La più bella coppia del mondo (1967).

== Winners ==
=== Cantagiro ===
Year	Group A	Group B	Group C
1962	Adriano Celentano - "Stai lontana da me"	Donatella Moretti - "L'abbraccio"
1963	Peppino Di Capri - "Non ti credo"	Michele - "Se mi vuoi lasciare"
1964	Gianni Morandi - "In ginocchio da te"	Paolo Mosca - "La voglia dell'estate"
1965	Rita Pavone - "Lui"	Mariolino Barberis - "Il duca della luna"
1966	Gianni Morandi - "Notte di ferragosto"	Mariolino Barberis - "Spiaggia d'argento"	Equipe 84 - "Io ho in mente te"
1967	Rita Pavone - "Questo nostro amore"	Massimo Ranieri - "Pietà per chi ti ama"	The Motowns - "Prendi la chitarra e vai"
1968	Caterina Caselli - "Il volto della vita"	Showmen - "Un'ora sola ti vorrei"
1969	Massimo Ranieri - "Rose rosse"	Rossano - "Ti voglio tanto bene"
1970	N/A	Paolo Mengoli - "Mi piaci da morire"
1971
1972	N/A	FM2 - "Chérie chérie"	Gens - "Per chi"

=== Nuovo Cantagiro ===
Year	Winner
1990	Paola Turci - "Frontiera"
1991	Francesca Alotta - "Chiamata urgente"
1992	Aleandro Baldi - "Il sole"
1993	Bracco Di Graci - "Guardia o ladro"

Il Cantagiro - Edizione De Carlo

Year	Artist	Song	Category
2005	Nts+	Adamo	N/A
2006	N/A	N/A	N/A
2007	Jackson Just	Cerca l'amore	N/A
2008	Yavanna	Che spettacolo!!!	Inediti
2008	Katya Miceli	Je t'aime	Cover
2009	Nausicaa	Un altro giorno	Inediti
2009	Michelle Perera	And I Am Telling You I'm Not Going	Cover
2009	Gianluca Buresta	Vivere due volte	Musica per film
2010	Domenica Varnassa	Caruggiu du Bertu	Inediti
2010	Giulia D.	Summertime	Cover
2010	Art Studio	Il cielo intorno a me	Original Band
2010	Serena Stanzani	Dire sempre o dire mai..	Videoclip
2011	Jospel	Una stella nascerá	Inediti
2012	Valentina Sarappa	Bosso	Inediti
2013	Dace Monaco	Pensami	Inediti
2014	Giuliana Tecce	La porta	Il Cantagiro
2014	Monica Soma	It really suits me	Il Cantagiro nel mondo
2014	Jasmar Cassar	Ti amo, I love you	Cantautore
2014	Emanuela Senes	Brivido blue	Interpreti
2014	Near	Diverso	Original Band
2014	Versi Sonori	Mai	Rapper
2014	Francesca Vitale	Ma quale amore	Lirico Pop
2014	Francesco Simone Batia	L'estate	Premio della critica
2014	Lorenzo De Santis	Poesia	Premio Radio Italia Anni 60
2014	Sara Pischedda	Io guerriero	Premio 2duerighe
