= Russia in the Junior Eurovision Song Contest 2010 =

- Junior Eurovision Song Contest 2010
- Country: Russia
- Selection process: National Final; 50% Jury; 50% Televoting
- Selection date: 30 May 2010

Competing entry
- Song: "Boy and Girl"
- Artist: Sasha Lazin & Liza Drozd

Placement
- Final result: 2nd, 119 points

Participation chronology

Russia was represented at the Junior Eurovision Song Contest 2010 in Minsk, Belarus. The Russian entry was selected through a national final, organised by Russian broadcaster All-Russia State Television and Radio Company (VGTRK). The final was held on 30 May 2010. Sasha Lazin & Liza Drozd and their song "Boy and Girl" won the national final, getting 11.00% of votes.

== Before Junior Eurovision ==
=== National Final ===
On 27 February 2010, VGTRK announced that a national final would be held to select Russia' entry for the Junior Eurovision Song Contest 2010. A submission period for interested artists was opened and lasted until 20 April 2010. A professional jury selected eighteen artists and songs from the applicants to proceed to the televised national final.

The selected artists and songs competed at the national final which took place on 30 May 2010 at the State Kremlin Palace in Moscow, hosted by Oksana Fedorova and Oskar Kuchera. In addition to the performances from the competitors, the show featured guest performances by Tolmachevy Twins, Aleksandra Golovchenko, Katya Ryabova and Yulia Savicheva. The members of the jury were Larisa Rubalskaya, Yury Entin, Valeriya, Gennady Gokhstein and Grigory Gladkov.

Final – 30 May 2010
Draw	Artist	Song	Percentage	Place
1	Sasha Lazin & Liza Drozd	"Boy and Girl"	11.0%	1
2	Maria Zaikina	"Mama vsegda govorila"	9.4%	2
3	Maria Chuchina and Anna Klimkina	"Ochkarik"	5.8%	6
4	Darya Tkachuk	"Po barabanu"	4.3%	12
5	Kseniya Kochetkova	"Veter-priyatel"	1.7%	20
6	Elena Onofrey	"Severnaya noch"	5.1%	9
7	Anastasiya Suchkova	"Jazz"	3.3%	15
8	Yaroslav Gubarev	"Narisuy svoy mir"	4.7%	10
9	Anastasiya Kolesnikova	"Davay poslushaem tishinu"	7.3%	4
10	Band "Eti deti"	"V shkolu"	4.1%	13
11	Duet "DaKi"	"Prostiye patsani"	5.6%	7
12	Zulfat Gabdulin	"Shkola zakrita"	5.2%	8
13	Regina Aitova	"Hey hey glyadi veseley"	2.6%	17
14	Show-group "Delfin"	"Kanikuly"	6.7%	5
15	Olga Hayrullina	"V serdtse muzika"	3.6%	14
16	Regina Shayhutdinova	"Zemnoy privet"	4.5%	11
17	Dmitry Narsiya	"Leto"	2.8%	16
18	Quartet "Polyanka"	"Gorod"	2.4%	18
19	Darya Lukash	"Day mne ruku"	1.9%	19
20	Ekaterina Kvitiya	"Tot kto sozdal etot mir"	8.1%	3

== At Junior Eurovision ==
During the allocation draw on 14 October 2010, Russia was drawn to 7th, following Sweden and preceding Latvia. Russia placed 2nd, scoring 119 points.

Sasha Lazin & Liza Drozd were joined on stage by four backing dancers, two boys and two girls: Grigory Sergeev, Viktoria Slavina, Ekaterina Kozlova and Ivan Smidovich.

In Russia, show were broadcast on Russia-1 with commentary by Olga Shelest. The Russian spokesperson revealing the result of the Russian vote was Philipp Mazurov.

=== Voting ===
Points awarded to Russia
Score	Country
12 points (Note: All countries received one set of 12 points to ensure no country finished with nul points.)	Armenia; Belarus; Malta
10 points	Lithuania; Sweden
8 points	Latvia; Netherlands; Serbia; Ukraine
7 points	Georgia; Moldova
6 points	
5 points	
4 points	Belgium
3 points	
2 points	
1 point	Macedonia

Points awarded by Russia
Score	Country
12 points	Armenia
10 points	Belarus
8 points	Georgia
7 points	Serbia
6 points	Lithuania
5 points	Moldova
4 points	Ukraine
3 points	Macedonia
2 points	Sweden
1 point	Belgium
