= Los Moonlights =

Uruguayan rock band

- Origin: Montevideo, Uruguay
- Genres: Rock en español
- Years active: Late 1960s–1977; 2015–present
- Labels: Clave; De La Planta
- Members: Sergio Iriarte; Osvaldo Iriarte; Carlitos González Iriarte; Sergio González Iriarte; Juanjo González Iriarte; Ricky Añón
- Past members: Gastón "Dino" Ciarlo; Beto Risso; Yamandú Pérez; César Jover; Quico Ciccone

Los Moonlights is a rock band from Montevideo, Uruguay. Their debut album, Moonlights, was their greatest commercial success. Formed in the 1960s, Los Moonlights disbanded in 1977. They reunited in 2015.

== History ==
Formed at the end the 1960s and fronted by the Iriarte brothers, Los Moonlights began by playing live covers. With the arrival of longtime members Gastón "Dino" Ciarlo and Yamandu Pérez, they began writing original material.

After recording a few singles for the Clave label, Los Moonlights signed with De La Planta. They recorded their debut album, which contains songs such as "Vamos dulce muchacha" and "Milonga de pelo largo". They mainly played shows in small local establishments.

With the 1973 Uruguayan coup d'état, the military dictatorship made it difficult for many rock bands to survive. Los Moonlights kept playing live as long as possible.

In 1976, they released their second album, Moonlight Hoy. However, the album was a commercial failure and the band dissolved in 1977.

In 2015, Los Moonlights reunited and launched a national tour to promote their new album, titled Otro día en la ciudad.

== Band members ==
Current members

- Sergio Iriarte – guitar, vocals
- Osvaldo Iriarte – bass, vocals
- Carlitos González Iriarte
- Sergio González Iriarte
- JuanjoGonzález Iriarte
- Ricky Añón

Past members

- Gastón "Dino" Ciarlo – rhythm guitar, vocals
- Cásar Jover – guitar
- Yamandú Pérez – drums
- Quico Ciccone – drums

== Discography ==
- Moonlights (1972)
- Moonlight Hoy (1976)
- Otro día en la ciudad (2015?/2016?)
