= Leila Ismailava =

Belarusian journalist

Leila Ismailova
- Лейла́ Рызва́наўна Ісмаілава
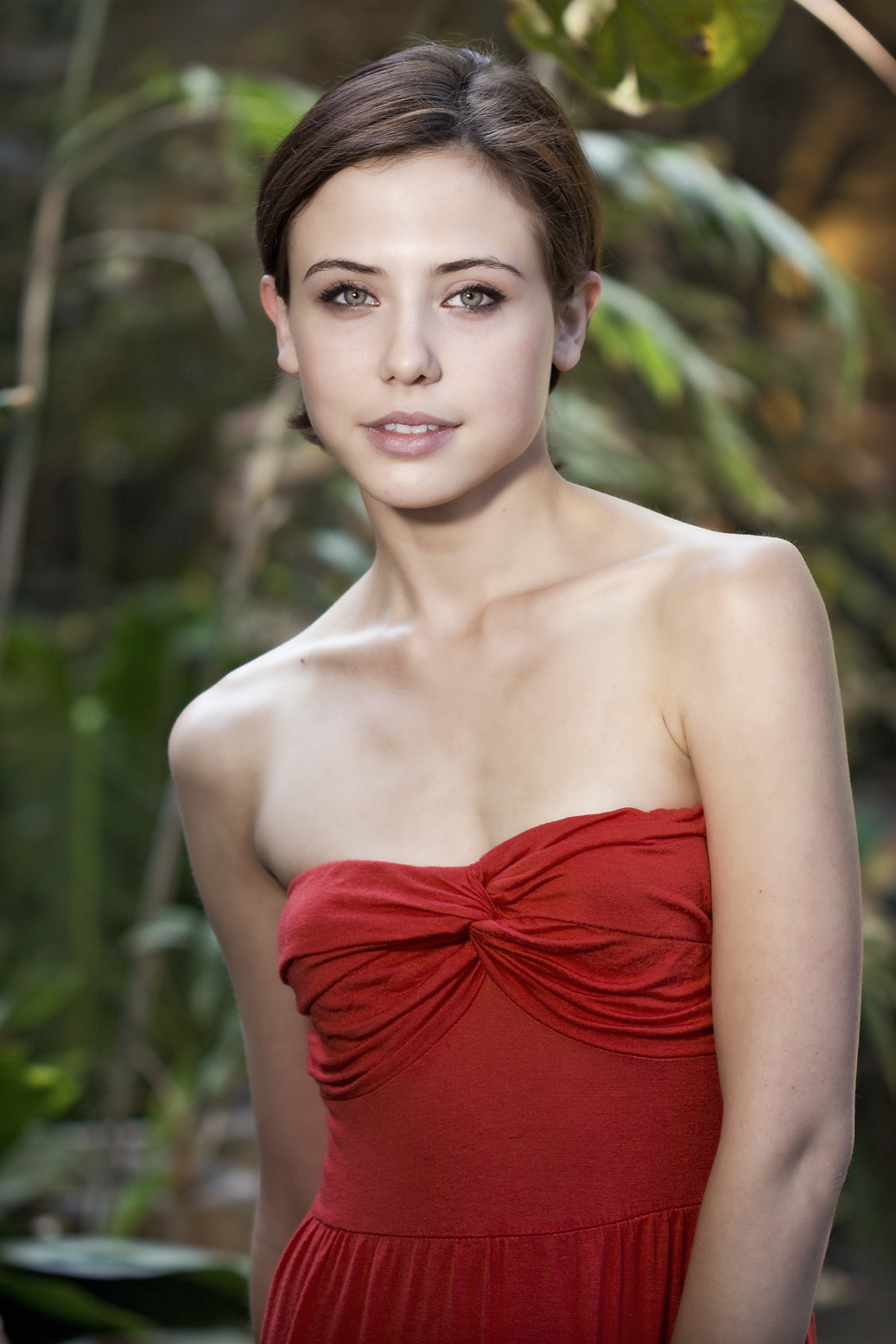
- Born: Leila Ryzvanauna Ismailova; 28 July 1991 (age 35); Minsk, Byelorussian SSR, Soviet Union
- Education: Belarusian State University
- Occupations: Journalist, model
- Years active: 2010–present
- Known for: Leading music TV programs
- Notable work: Junior Eurovision Song Contest 2010 (presenter)
- Television: Belarus-1
- Title: Presenter
- Term: 2006–2016
- Awards: Belarusian National Television Reward 2011: The Best Presenter of the Musical and Entertaining Shows
- Website: leila.tv

Leila Ryzvanauna Ismailova (Belarusian: Лейла́ Рызва́наўна Ісмаілава, Azerbaijani: Leyla Rizvan qızı İsmayılova; born 28 July 1991) is a Belarusian journalist, TV presenter, and model of Azerbaijani ancestry. In particular, she was the host of the Junior Eurovision Song Contest 2010, which was held in Minsk (together with Dzianis Kurian). Leila was the spokesman of the Belarusian voting in the Eurovision Song Contest 2011, and hosted the national selection in Belarus for Eurovision 2012.

In 2006 Leila graduated from the Lyceum of the Belarusian State University (history form), then she graduated from the Institute of Journalism of the Belarusian State University (audiovisual journalism, diploma with honour, the best alumna 2011).
