= Belgium in the Junior Eurovision Song Contest 2010 =

- Junior Eurovision Song Contest 2010
- Participating broadcaster: Vlaamse Radio- en Televisieomroeporganisatie (VRT)
- Country: Belgium
- Selection process: Junior Eurosong 2010
- Selection date: 1 October 2010

Competing entry
- Song: "Get Up!"
- Artist: Jill & Lauren
- Songwriters: Lauren De Ruyck; Peter Gillis; Jill Van Vooren; Alain Vande Putte; Miguel Wiels

Placement
- Final result: 7th, 61 point

Participation chronology

Belgium was represented at the Junior Eurovision Song Contest 2010 with the song "Get Up!", written by Lauren De Ruyck, Peter Gillis, Jill Van Vooren, Alain Vande Putte, and Miguel Wiels, and performed by Van Vooren and De Ruyck as Jill & Lauren. The Belgian participating broadcaster, Vlaamse Radio- en Televisieomroeporganisatie (VRT), selected its entry for the contest through a national televised competition titled Junior Eurosong 2010.

== Before Eurovision ==
=== Junior Eurosong 2010 ===
Junior Eurosong 2010 was the 8-song national competition organised by Belgian broadcaster Vlaamse Radio- en Televisieomroeporganisatie (VRT) to select its entry for the Junior Eurovision Song Contest 2010.

Before the final, four semi-finals were held with two songs each. A five-member jury panel consisting of Walter Grootaers, Jelle Van Dael, Stan Van Samang, Ralf Mackenbach (who represented the Netherlands in 2009) alongside one guest juror in each semi-final selected the winning entry of each semi-final to qualify for the final. In the final, the winner was selected via a 50/50 combination of jury voting and public televoting.

==== Semi-final 1 ====
The first semi-final took place on 27 September 2010. Two of the competing entries performed, and the five-member jury panel selected the winning entry to qualify for the final. The guest juror was Laura Omloop (who represented Belgium in 2009).

Semi-final 1 – 27 September 2010
R/O	Artist	Song	Votes	Place
1	DnA	"Power aan de kids"	4	1
2	Ine	"Kusje van mij"	1	2

==== Semi-final 2 ====
The second semi-final took place on 28 September 2010. Two of the competing entries performed, and the five-member jury panel selected the winning entry to qualify for the final. The guest juror was Eva Storme (who represented Belgium in 2007).

Semi-final 2 – 28 September 2010
R/O	Artist	Song	Votes	Place
1	Emma	"Jamanee"	2	2
2	Ferre	"Met mijn ogen toe"	3	1

==== Semifinal 3 ====
The third semi-final took place on 29 September 2010. Two of the competing entries performed, and a five-member jury panel selected the winning entry to qualify for the final. The guest juror was Laura Omloop (who represented Belgium in 2009).

Semi-final 3 – 29 September 2010
R/O	Artist	Song	Votes	Place
1	Emile	"Diep in mijn lijf"	1	2
2	Jill & Lauren	"Get Up!"	4	1

==== Semifinal 4 ====
The fourth semi-final took place on 30 September 2010. Two of the competing entries performed, and a five-member jury panel selected the winning entry to qualify for the final. The guest juror was Thor Salden (who represented Belgium in 2006).

Semi-final 4 – 30 September 2010
R/O	Artist	Song	Votes	Place
1	Luis	"In mijn dromen"	1	2
2	Ymke	"Vive la fete"	4	1

==== Final ====
The final took place on 1 October 2010. The winner was selected via a 50/50 combination of jury voting and public televoting. The jury panel that voted in the final consisting of Walter Grootaers, Jelle Van Dael, Stan Van Samang, Ralf Mackenbach, Laura Omloop, Eva Storme and Thor Salden.

Final – 1 October 2010
R/O	Artist	Song
1	Ymke	"Vive la fete"
2	Ferre	"Met mijn ogen toe"
3	Jill & Lauren	"Get Up!"
4	DnA	"Power aan de kids"

== At Junior Eurovision ==
=== Voting ===
Points awarded to Belgium
Score	Country
12 points (Note: All countries received one set of 12 points to ensure no country finished with nul points.)	Netherlands
10 points	
8 points	Macedonia
7 points	
6 points	Sweden
5 points	Lithuania; Serbia
4 points	Malta
3 points	Belarus; Moldova
2 points	Georgia
1 point	Russia

Points awarded by Belgium
Score	Country
12 points	Armenia
10 points	Netherlands
8 points	Sweden
7 points	Serbia
6 points	Moldova
5 points	Lithuania
4 points	Russia
3 points	Georgia
2 points	Macedonia
1 point	Latvia
