= Lithuania in the Junior Eurovision Song Contest 2010 =

- Junior Eurovision Song Contest 2010
- Country: Lithuania
- Selection process: Vaikų Eurovizijos nacionalinė atranka
- Selection date: Semi Final: 12 September 2010; 19 September 2010; Final: 26 September 2010

Competing entry
- Song: "Oki doki"
- Artist: Bartas

Placement
- Final result: 6th, 67 points

Participation chronology

Lithuanian broadcaster LRT announced their participation for Junior Eurovision Song Contest 2010 in August 2010. The National Final, "Vaikų Eurovizija" chose Bartas, the 14‑year-old singer to represent Lithuania in the Junior Eurovision Song Contest 2010.

== Before Junior Eurovision ==
=== Vaikų Eurovizijos nacionalinė atranka ===
The national selection show Vaikų Eurovizijos nacionalinė atranka consisted of two semi-finals held on 12 and 19 September 2010 and a final held on 26 September 2010.

The results of the semi-finals were determined by a 50/50 combination of votes from a jury panel and public televoting. In the final, the winner was chosen in two rounds of voting - the first to select the top three by the 50/50 combination of jury voting and public televoting, and the second to select the winner by the jury.

==== Semi-final 1 ====
The first semi-final was held on 12 September 2010. 10 songs competed and 7 qualified to the next round instead of the initially planned 5 due to a three-way tie for fifth place.

Semi-final 1 – 12 September 2010
Draw	Artist	Song	Jury		Public		Total	Place
Draw	Artist	Song	Votes	Points	Televote	Points	Total	Place
1	Karolina Žibkutė & Kamilė Anančenko	"Kas nutiko?"	18	3	351	5	8	8
2	Silvestras Beltė	"Pi-Pa-Po"	23	5	514	10	15	3
3	Pyplės	"Pavasaris"	32	6	374	6	12	5
4	Aida Mazytė	"Mes tik vaikai"	9	2	93	1	3	10
5	Bartas	"Oki Doki"	65	12	458	8	20	1
6	Deka	"Jei galėčiau"	36	7	563	12	19	2
7	Dominykas Kovaliovas	"Saldi daina"	60	10	219	2	12	7
8	Gabrielė Rybko	"Mano kasos"	20	4	225	3	7	9
9	Silvija Semionovaitė, Gabrielė Matonytė & Agnė Lukaševičiūtė	"Muzika"	32	6	446	7	13	4
10	Domas Vaivada	"Naktinis meistras"	53	8	332	4	12	6

==== Semi-final 2 ====
The second semi-final was held on 19 September 2010. 10 songs competed and 5 participants qualified, since there was no tiebreak.

Semi-final 2 – 19 September 2010
Draw	Artist	Song	Jury		Public		Total	Place
Draw	Artist	Song	Votes	Points	Televote	Points	Total	Place
1	Linksmasis DO	"Šypsos angelai"	54	7	251	3	10	6
2	Ieva Binevičiūtė	"Svajonė"	16	2	614	7	9	7
3	Bernardas Garbačiauskas	"Tai mano muzika"	27	4	381	5	9	8
4	Milita Daikerytė	"Tarp tavęs ir manęs"	63	10	1058	12	22	1
5	Nedas Šiuipys	"Pirmas bučinys"	26	3	194	1	4	10
6	Dalius Garnys	"Žemės balsas"	34	6	236	2	8	9
7	Deimantė Vaičiūtė	"Esu reikalinga"	31	5	449	6	11	5
8	UPS	"Čiuk - Čiuku"	69	12	316	3	15	3
9	Daumantas Bagdonavičius	"Gal"	27	4	720	10	14	4
10	Guoda Marija Petrauskaitė	"Į kelionę"	59	8	698	8	16	2

==== Final ====
The final was held on 26 September 2010 at the LRT TV Studios in Vilnius, where 12 participants competed instead of the initially planned 10, as this was the first time that a qualify-rule was broken due to the first semi-final having seven finalists. The winner was chosen in two rounds of voting. In the first round the top 3 were chosen by televoting (50%) and a nine-member "expert" jury (50%), while in the second round the winner was chosen by the "expert" jury.

Final – 26 September 2010
Draw	Artist	Song	Jury	Public		Total	Place
Draw	Artist	Song	Jury	Televote	Points	Total	Place
1	Deimantė Vaičiūtė	"Esu reikalinga"	2	314	1	3	10
2	Daumantas Bagdonavičius	"Gal"	1	1234	7	8	7
3	UPS	"Čiuk - Čiuku"	12	537	3	15	3
4	Milita Daikerytė	"Tarp tavęs ir manęs"	7	1881	10	17	2
5	Domas Vaivada	"Naktinis meistras"	8	792	5	13	4
6	Bartas	"Oki Doki"	10	2139	12	22	1
7	Deka	"Jei galėčiau"	6	863	6	12	6
8	Dominykas Kovaliovas	"Saldi daina"	5	531	2	7	8
9	Pyplės	"Pavasaris"	1	331	1	2	12
10	Guoda Marija Petrauskaitė	"Į kelionę"	4	1630	8	12	5
11	Silvija Semionovaitė, Gabrielė Matonytė & Agnė Lukaševičiūtė	"Muzika"	1	405	1	2	11
12	Silvestras Beltė	"Pi-Pa-Po"	3	559	4	7	8

Superfinal – 26 September 2010
Draw	Artist	Song	Place
1	UPS	"Čiuk - Čiuku"	2
2	Milita Daikerytė	"Tarp tavęs ir manęs"	3
3	Bartas	"Oki Doki"	1

== At Junior Eurovision ==
=== Voting ===
Points awarded to Lithuania
Score	Country
12 points (Note: All countries received one set of 12 points to ensure no country finished with nul points.)	
10 points	Georgia
8 points	
7 points	
6 points	Belarus; Latvia; Russia
5 points	Belgium
4 points	Armenia; Serbia; Sweden; Ukraine
3 points	
2 points	Macedonia; Moldova; Netherlands
1 point	

Points awarded by Lithuania
Score	Country
12 points	Georgia
10 points	Russia
8 points	Latvia
7 points	Armenia
6 points	Serbia
5 points	Belgium
4 points	Belarus
3 points	Sweden
2 points	Netherlands
1 point	Moldova
