= Se mi vuoi lasciare =

Single by Michele

from the album Michele
- B-side: "Cosa vuoi da me"
- Released: 1963
- Length: 4:30
- Label: RCA
- Songwriter(s): Rosario Leva, Gian Piero Reverberi

Michele singles chronology
"Ma se tu vorrai" (1962)	"Se mi vuoi lasciare" (1963)	"Ridi" (1964)

Audio
- "Se mi vuoi lasciare" on YouTube

"Se mi vuoi lasciare" (transl. 'If you want to leave me') is a 1963 Italian song composed by Gian Piero Reverberi (music) and Rosario Leva (lyrics) and performed by Michele. It is included in his debut album Michele.

== Overview ==
The song won the emerging artists' competition at the 1963 Cantagiro and topped the singles chart, marking Michele's breakthrough and becoming his signature song, with the refrain "Se mi vuoi lasciare dimmi almeno perchè" ('If you want to leave me at least tell me why') becoming a common saying among teenagers of the time. The single sold over 700,000 copies.

The song has been praised for its structure, characterized by "the charming chiaroscuro of Michele's voice and by the alternation between masculine tones and striking falsettos, underscored by a sharp piccolo".

Artists who covered the song include Petula Clark, Dick Rivers, José Guardiola, Erik Montry, and Jo Fedeli.

== Track listing ==
No.	Title	Writer(s)	Length
1.	"Se mi vuoi lasciare"	Leva, Reverberi	2:42
2.	"Cosa vuoi da me"	Leva, Reverberi	2:14

== Charts ==
Chart (1963-4)	Peak position
Argentina (Billboard)	6
Chile (Billboard)	1
Italy (Musica e dischi)	1
