= Macedonia in the Junior Eurovision Song Contest 2010 =

- Junior Eurovision Song Contest 2010
- Country: Macedonia
- Selection process: Dečja pesna Eurovizije
- Selection date: 25 September 2010

Competing entry
- Song: "Eooo, Eooo"
- Artist: Anja Veterova

Placement
- Final result: 12th, 38 points

Participation chronology

Macedonia selected their Junior Eurovision entry for 2010 through Detska pesna za Eurovizija, a national selection consisting of 5 songs. The winner was Anja Veterova, with the song "Eooo, Eooo".

Anja represented Macedonia at the Junior Eurovision Song Contest 2010, in Minsk, Belarus.

== Before Junior Eurovision ==
=== Dečja pesna Eurovizije ===
The final took place on 25 September 2010, hosted by Monica Todorovska and Tony Drenkovski. Five songs competed and the winner was decided by a combination of votes from a jury panel (50%) and televoting (50%).

Final – 25 September 2010
| Draw | Artist | Song | Jury | Televote | | Total | Place |
| Draw | Artist | Song | Jury | Votes | Points | Total | Place |
|---|---|---|---|---|---|---|---|
| 1 | Dino Hridzik | "Ar en bi do tri" (Ар ен би до три) | 5 | 86 | 6 | 11 | 5 |
| 2 | Martina Avramovska | "Zapejte" (Запејте) | 8 | 233 | 8 | 16 | 2 |
| 3 | Nikola Iliev | "Za tvorite oči" (За творите очи) | 7 | 87 | 7 | 14 | 3 |
| 4 | Amajlija Stojanovska | "Igraj, skokaj, tancuvaj" (Играј, скокај, танцувај) | 6 | 79 | 5 | 11 | 5 |
| 5 | Anja Veterova | "Magična pesna (Eo Eo)" (Магична песна) | 10 | 332 | 10 | 20 | 1 |

== At Junior Eurovision ==
=== Voting ===
Points awarded to Macedonia
| Score | Country |
|---|---|
| 12 points (Note: All countries received one set of 12 points to ensure no country finished with nul points.) | Serbia |
| 10 points | |
| 8 points | |
| 7 points | |
| 6 points | |
| 5 points | Sweden |
| 4 points | |
| 3 points | Russia |
| 2 points | Belgium; Ukraine |
| 1 point | Latvia; Moldova |

Points awarded by Macedonia
| Score | Country |
|---|---|
| 12 points | Serbia |
| 10 points | Armenia |
| 8 points | Belgium |
| 7 points | Belarus |
| 6 points | Georgia |
| 5 points | Ukraine |
| 4 points | Malta |
| 3 points | Sweden |
| 2 points | Lithuania |
| 1 point | Russia |
