= Sweden in the Junior Eurovision Song Contest 2010 =

- Junior Eurovision Song Contest 2010
- Country: Sweden
- Selection process: Internal selection
- Announcement date: Artist: 1 October 2010; Song: 5 October 2010

Competing entry
- Song: "Allt jag vill ha"
- Artist: Josefine Ridell

Placement
- Final result: 11th, 48 points

Participation chronology

Sweden was represented at the Junior Eurovision Song Contest in 2010, with Swedish broadcaster Sveriges Television (SVT) having returned to organise the Swedish entry for the first time since 2005, after TV4 had withdrawn prior to the contest. An internal selection was used to select the 7th Swedish entry in the Junior Eurovision Song Contest, with Josefine Ridell being selected to sing "Allt jag vill ha" at the contest in Minsk, Belarus.

== Before Junior Eurovision ==
=== SVT returns ===
In July 2010 it was confirmed that SVT, the original Swedish organiser for the Junior Eurovision Song Contest from 2003 to 2005, would make a return to the contest after leaving the contest in 2005, along with Norwegian broadcaster NRK and Danish broadcaster DR to form the MGP Nordic contest. From 2006 to 2009 the Swedish presence in the contest was continued by commercial broadcaster TV4. In 2010 TV4 announced their withdrawal from Junior Eurovision, allowing SVT to re-enter after MGP Nordic took a year out in 2010.

The EBU's coordinator of the contest, Svante Stockselius, has labelled SVT's return to the contest a big achievement in terms of negotiations with possible participants and expressed hope that other Scandinavian broadcasters may also return to the show.

=== Artist and song selection ===
From 2003 and 2005 SVT had used Lilla Melodifestivalen to select their entries, and had continued to use the contest to select the Swedish entries for MGP Nordic. However in March 2010 SVT announced that all Junior projects, including Lilla Melodifestivalen and MGP Nordic, would be scrapped for 2010. In August 2010 SVT announced that they would select their entry for Junior Eurovision internally, and would have a talent search to select the artist to represent Sweden in Belarus.

On 1 October SVT revealed their entry for Minsk: 13-year-old Josefine Ridell was selected to represent Sweden with the song "Allt jag vill ha" (Everything I want), written by Josefine, four-time Eurovision songwriter Thomas G:son, 2009 Azeri contestant Arash, Robert Uhlmann and Johan Bejerholm. Warner Music Sweden officially released the song on 5 October.

== At Junior Eurovision ==
=== Voting ===
Points awarded to Sweden
Score	Country
12 points (Note: All countries received one set of 12 points to ensure no country finished with nul points.)	
10 points	
8 points	Belgium
7 points	
6 points	
5 points	
4 points	Belarus; Latvia; Netherlands
3 points	Lithuania; Macedonia; Ukraine
2 points	Armenia; Russia; Serbia
1 point	Malta

Points awarded by Sweden
Score	Country
12 points	Armenia
10 points	Russia
8 points	Serbia
7 points	Georgia
6 points	Belgium
5 points	Macedonia
4 points	Lithuania
3 points	Netherlands
2 points	Moldova
1 point	Latvia
