= Sonja Škorić =

- Born: 26 February 1996 (age 30); Pančevo, Serbia
- Genres: Pop, classical crossover, acoustic, easy listening
- Instruments: Vocals, piano, guitar, violin, harmonica
- Years active: 2002–present

Sonja Škorić (Serbian: Соња Шкорић; born 26 February 1996 in Pančevo, Serbia) is a singer-songwriter who won the Serbian national selection for the Junior Eurovision Song Contest 2010.

On 26 September 2010 she won the Serbian national selection for the Junior Eurovision Song Contest 2010 in Minsk with the song "Čarobna noć".

Sonja has been singing since the age of five. In 2002 she won the Raspevano proleće contest; in between 2003 and 2005 she won the same contest in a streak. In April 2010 she was Serbia's entry at the San Remo junior contest in Italy.

Awards and achievements
Preceded by Ništa lično with "Onaj pravi"	Serbia in the Junior Eurovision Song Contest; 2010	Succeeded by Emilija Đonin with "Svet u mojim očima"
