= Georgia in the Junior Eurovision Song Contest 2010 =

- Junior Eurovision Song Contest 2010
- Country: Georgia
- Selection process: National Final
- Selection date: 12 September 2010

Competing entry
- Song: "Mari Dari"
- Artist: Mariam Kakhelishvili

Placement
- Final result: 4th, 109 points

Participation chronology

Georgia was represented at the Junior Eurovision Song Contest 2010 which took place on 20 November 2010, in Minsk, Belarus. Georgian Public Broadcaster (GPB) was responsible for organising their entry for the contest. Mariam Kakhelishvili was selected to represent Georgia with the song "Mari Dari". Georgia placed fourth with 109 points.

== Background ==
Prior to the 2010 Contest, Georgia had participated in the Junior Eurovision Song Contest three times since its debut in 2007. They have never missed an edition of the contest, and have won at the 2008 contest.

== Before Junior Eurovision ==
=== National final ===
Georgia selected their Junior Eurovision entry for 2010 through a national final consisting of 11 songs. The winner was Mariam Kakhelishvili, with the song, "Mari Dari".

Final – 12 September 2010
Draw	Artist	Song
1	Hereli Gogonebi	"Mogesalmebit"
2	Ana Davitaia	"Garet Mzea"
3	Ana-Bana	"Herio"
4	Dato Zeikidze	"Sizmari"
5	Girls’ Trio	"Tsvima"
6	Harmony	"Zgvis Periebi"
7	Mermisi	"Sakhaliso"
8	Kato Salukvadze	"Old-time Rock&Roll"
9	Melano Pisadze	"Ushenoba"
10	Mariam Kakhelishvili	"Mari Dari"
11	Antsebi	"Esa, Mesa"

== Artist and song information ==
=== Mariam Kakhelishvili ===
Mariam Kakhelishvili
- Born: 9 October 1995 (age 30)
- Origin: Tbilisi, Georgia
- Genres: Pop, dance-pop, electro
- Occupations: Singer-songwriter, dancer, fashion model
- Instruments: Vocals, guitar
- Years active: 2000–present

The winning contestant, Mariam Kakhelishvili, is a singer from Georgia managed by composer Giga Kukhiadnidze and Bzikebi Studio.

=== Mari Dari ===
(Georgia (country)) "Mari Dari"

Junior Eurovision Song Contest 2010 entry
- Country: Georgia
- Artist: Mariam Kakhelishvili
- Composers: Giga Kukhianidze, Mariam Kakhelishvili
- Lyricist: Giga Kukhianidze

Finals performance
- Final result: 4th
- Final points: 109

Entry chronology
- ◄ "Lurji prinveli" (2009)
- "Candy Music" (2011) ►

"Mari Dari" is a song by Georgian singer Mariam Kakhelishvili. It represented Georgia during the Junior Eurovision Song Contest 2010. It is composed by Giga Kukhianidze with lyrics from both Kukhianidze and Kakhelishvili. Although it consists of mostly meaningless words, it contains a few words in Georgian, including dari, meaning sunshine.

== At Junior Eurovision ==
During the running order draw which took place on 14 October 2010, Georgia was drawn to perform tenth on 20 November 2010, following Belgium and preceding Malta.

=== Final ===
During the final, Mariam Kakhelishvili performed amongst four background dancers, who wore white outfits and pink gloves and wigs. Mariam Kakhelishvili placed fourth at the Junior Eurovision Song Contest 2010, receiving 109 points for her song "Mari Dari".

=== Voting ===
Points awarded to Georgia
Score	Country
12 points (Note: All countries received one set of 12 points to ensure no country finished with nul points.)	Lithuania
10 points	Serbia; Ukraine
8 points	Armenia; Russia
7 points	Belarus; Latvia; Malta; Netherlands; Sweden
6 points	Macedonia
5 points	Moldova
4 points	
3 points	Belgium
2 points	
1 point	

Points awarded by Georgia
Score	Country
12 points	Belarus
10 points	Lithuania
8 points	Netherlands
7 points	Russia
6 points	Moldova
5 points	Latvia
4 points	Ukraine
3 points	Armenia
2 points	Belgium
1 point	Serbia
