= Denis Kurian =

Belarusian television presenter and journalist

- Belarusian: Дзяніс Кур'ян
- Born: Dzianis Kurian; July 24, 1984 (age 42); Minsk, BSSR
- Other name: Denis Kourian
- Occupations: Journalist, presenter
- Notable work: Junior Eurovision Song Contest 2010 (presenter)
- Television: Belarus-1
- Title: Presenter
- Spouse: Julia Kurian

Denis Kurian (Belarusian: Дзяніс Кур'ян; born in Minsk) is a Belarusian journalist and television presenter. He commentated for Belarus at the Junior Eurovision Song Contestfrom 2003 to 2009. He then hosted the Junior Eurovision Song Contest 2010, which was held in Minsk (together with Leila Ismailava).
