= Little Tony =

Little Tony may refer to:

- Little Tony (film), Dutch comedy film
- Little Tony (singer) (1941–2013), Italian-born pop singer and actor
- Tony Leung Chiu-wai (AKA Little Tony, born 1962), Hong Kong film and TV actor
