= Michele (singer) =

Italian singer

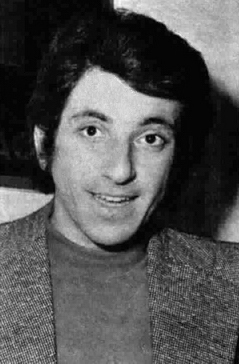
- Michele in 1972 (Radiocorriere)

Background information
- Born: Gianfranco Michele Maisano; 22 June 1944 (age 82); Vigevano, Kingdom of Italy
- Occupation: Singer
- Years active: 1958–1970s

Gianfranco Michele Maisano (born 22 June 1944), known mononymously as Michele, is an Italian singer and occasional actor.

== Background ==
Born in Vigevano, as a child Maisano moved to Genoa, where he attended the Nautical Institute. He recorded his first single at age 14. Abandoned the name Michele Maisano, he obtained his first success as Michele in 1963 with the song "Se mi vuoi lasciare", which won the musical contest Cantagiro and ranked first in the Italian hit parade.

In the sixties Michele then achieved some further successes including some cover versions to songs by Elvis Presley. After a less successful period, in 1971, he got one another main success with the song "Susan dei Marinai", with an uncredited contribution to the lyrics by Fabrizio De André. In 1970 Michele entered the competition at the Sanremo Music Festival with the song "L'addio", followed two years later by another participation with the song "Forestiero". During his career Michele was also a music producer and an occasional actor.

== Discography ==
=== Selected singles ===
Year	Title	Position
1958	Sono dannato	-
1963	Se mi vuoi lasciare	1
1963	Ridi	3
1964	Ti ringrazio perchè	3
1965	Dopo i giorni dell'amore	8
1965	Ti senti sola stasera	15
1966	Quando sei con me	14
1966	E' stato facile dirti addio	9
1967	Dite a Laura che l'amo	17
1968	Che male c'è	20
1970	Ho camminato	17
1971	Susan dei marinai	10
1972	Un uomo senza una stella	-
1977	Amico Elvis	-

=== Studio albums ===
- 1963 Michele
- 1966 Se sei sola
- 1970 Ritratto di un cantante
- 1971 Vivendo cantando
- 1973 Cantautori
