= Moldova in the Junior Eurovision Song Contest 2010 =

- Junior Eurovision Song Contest 2010
- Country: Moldova
- Selection process: Eurovisionul copiilor
- Selection date: 25 September 2010

Competing entry
- Song: "Ali Baba"
- Artist: Ștefan Roșcovan

Placement
- Final result: 8th, 54 points

Participation chronology

Moldova debuted in the Junior Eurovision 2010, with their entry selected through Eurovisionul copiilor, a national selection consisting of 12 songs, organised by the Moldovan broadcaster TeleRadio-Moldova (TRM), on 25 September 2010. Ștefan Roșcovan was the winner of the selection, with the song "Ali Baba".

== Before Junior Eurovision ==
=== Eurovisionul copiilor ===
18 entries were submitted to TRM, which 12 were chosen to compete in the national final.

The final was filmed on 19 and 20 September 2010 and aired on 25 September 2010. Twelve songs competed and the winner was selected based on the combination of a public televote and the votes of an expert jury.

| Draw | Artist | Song | Jury | | Televote | | Total | Place |
|---|---|---|---|---|---|---|---|---|
| 1 | Daniela Corcodel | "Zborul" | 10 | 0 | 6.74% | 5 | 5 | 10 |
| 2 | Natalia Turcan | "Zbor" | 15 | 1 | 1.55% | 0 | 1 | 12 |
| 3 | Valeria Pașa | "Visul Meu" | 37 | 6 | 5.80% | 4 | 10 | 4 |
| 4 | Ecaterina Cojocaru | "Doar mamă" | 28 | 3 | 7.76% | 6 | 9 | 5 |
| 5 | Diana Sturza | "Sa ne distram" | 47 | 8 | 3.18% | 1 | 9 | 7 |
| 6 | Star-Ty | "Network" | 26 | 2 | 15.69% | 8 | 10 | 3 |
| 7 | Mihaela Tatarciuc | "Pianistul" | 43 | 7 | 3.97% | 2 | 9 | 6 |
| 8 | Cornelia Vozian | "Daca ar fi" | 30 | 4 | 1.66% | 0 | 4 | 11 |
| 9 | Paula Paraschiv | "Ce-ar fi lumea" | 36 | 5 | 4.64% | 3 | 8 | 8 |
| 10 | Adriana Popovici | "Summer Day, Summer Night" | 12 | 0 | 9.68% | 7 | 7 | 9 |
| 11 | LolliPops | "Un noroc și-un dor" | 52 | 10 | 17.66% | 10 | 20 | 2 |
| 12 | Ștefan Roșcovan | "Ali Baba" | 54 | 12 | 21.59% | 12 | 24 | 1 |

== At Junior Eurovision ==
At the contest, Moldova finished in 8th place out of 14 countries, receiving 54 points.

=== Voting ===
Points awarded to Moldova
| Score | Country |
|---|---|
| 12 points (Note: All countries received one set of 12 points to ensure no country finished with nul points.) | |
| 10 points | Malta |
| 8 points | |
| 7 points | Armenia |
| 6 points | Belgium; Georgia |
| 5 points | Russia |
| 4 points | |
| 3 points | |
| 2 points | Belarus; Latvia; Sweden |
| 1 point | Lithuania; Serbia |

Points awarded by Moldova
| Score | Country |
|---|---|
| 12 points | Serbia |
| 10 points | Armenia |
| 8 points | Latvia |
| 7 points | Russia |
| 6 points | Belarus |
| 5 points | Georgia |
| 4 points | Malta |
| 3 points | Belgium |
| 2 points | Lithuania |
| 1 point | Macedonia |
