= Lidushik =

- Also known as: Lidushik
- Born: Lida Arakelyan; 11 July 1999 (age 26); Yerevan, Armenia
- Origin: Armenia
- Genres: Pop, pop-folk
- Occupation: Singer
- Instruments: Vocals, piano and pipe
- Years active: 2003-present
- Labels: Independent
- Website: lidushik.am

Lida Arakelyan (Armenian: Լիդա Առաքելյան; born 11 July 1999), better known by her stage name Lidushik (Armenian: Լիդուշիկ), is an Armenian singer, best known for songs such as "Poqreri Ashkharh" (2008), "Yerg em Horinel" (2009), "Mankutyun" (2010), and "Pare" (2011).

== Life and work ==
Lida Arakelyan was born on 11 July 1999 in Yerevan, the capital city of Armenia. Lidushik started singing at the age of 3, and has been a part of the children's pop/pop-folk ensemble "Arevik" from 2004 to late-2010. She adopted the stage name of Lidushik in early 2005, and is one of the youngest people in Armenia to ever gain popularity. In 2011, Lidushik took part in the fourth annual contest for child singers, New Wave Junior (Armenian: Մանկական Նոր Ալիք), and got the special prize from the television channel RaiUno which let her to take part in the popular Italian TV show "Ti lascio una canzone."

In 2013 she had her first solo concert in Gyumri, which was followed by a second solo concert in Glendale, California, third in Yerevan, fourth solo concert at the end of the year in Pasadena, California, and fifth in Vanadzor in 2014. Also, she took part in New Wave Junior again as a guest, performing with Tamara Gverdsiteli, Dominick Jocker and Nikolay Baskov.

== Discography ==
=== Albums ===
- Kids' World (2012)
- Im Poqrik Hayastan (2015)

=== Singles ===
Year	Title	English translation	Album
2007	"Tzuki yerge"	Dwarf's song	Non-album single(s)
2007	"Mrjyunnere"	Ants	Kids' World
2008	"Poqueri Ashkharh"	Kids' world	Kids' World
2009	"Yerg em Horinel"	I made up a song	Kids' World
2010	"Im Yerevan"	My Yerevan	Kids' World
2010	"Yev arev, yev andrev"	Sometimes sun, and rain	Kids' World
2010	"Mankutyun"	Childhood	Kids' World
2011	"Pare"	The dance	Kids' World
2012	Hayuhi em	I'm an Armenian Girl	Kids' World
2012	"Mama" (ft. Nune Yesayan)	Mother	Non-album single(s)
2012	"Shnorhavor"	Congratulations	Im Poqrik Hayastan
2013	"Tik-Tak"	Tick-Tock	Im Poqrik Hayastan
2013	"Qo Nman" (ft. Diana Kalashova)	Just like you	Im Poqrik Hayastan
2013	"Barin e Hakhtum"	Kindness Wins	Im Poqrik Hayastan
2013	"Tsunde Qo"	Your Birthday	Im Poqrik Hayastan
2014	"La La La"	---	Im Poqrik Hayastan
2014	"Im Poqrik Hayastan"	My little Armenia	Im Poqrik Hayastan
2015	"Hayastani Nor Patani"	New youth of Armenia	Im Poqrik Hayastan
2017	"Srtum Arajin Ser"	In the first love	Non-album single(s)
2018	"Havata"	Faith	Non-album single(s)
2019	"Yes u du"	Me and you	Non-album single(s)
2021	"Liqy Ser"	Full of love	Non-album single(s)

=== Music videos ===
- Poqreri Ashkharh (2008)
- Yerg em Horinel (2010)
- Pare (2011)
- Mama (feat. Nune Yesayan) (2012)
- Tik-Tak (2013)
- Qo Nman (feat. Diana Kalashova) (2013)
- La La La (2014)
- Im Poqrik Hayastan (2014)
- Hayastani Nor Patani (2015)
- Srtum Arajin Ser (2017)
- Yes u du (2019)
- Liqy Ser (2021)
- Yerkar Mna (2023)
- Du Indz Hamar Es(2023)
