= Netherlands in the Junior Eurovision Song Contest 2010 =

2010 Junior Eurovision participation

- Junior Eurovision Song Contest 2010
- Country: Netherlands
- Selection process: Junior Songfestival 2010; 33% Jury; 33% Kids Jury; 33% Televoting
- Selection date: Semi Final: 18 September 2010; 25 September 2010; Final: 2 October 2010

Competing entry
- Song: "My Family"
- Artist: Anna & Senna

Placement
- Final result: 9th with 51 points

Participation chronology

Netherlands selected their Junior Eurovision entry for 2010 through Junior Songfestival, a national selection consisting of 8 songs. The winners were Anna & Senna, with the song "My Family".

In Minsk, the song placed 9th, in a field of 14 songs, with 51 points.

== Before Junior Eurovision ==
=== Junior Songfestival 2010 ===
The songs were split into two semi finals. From each semi final two sentries qualified for the final based on the decision of adult and children juries as well as televoting. The fifth entry in the final was chosen by online voting (web wildcard).

==== Semi-final 1 ====
Semi-final 1 – 18 September 2010]]
Draw	Artist	Song	Kids Jury	Expert Jury	Televote	Total	Place
1	Phoebe en Stijn	"De wereld is van ons allemaal"	8	8	8	24	4
2	Rosa	"Vrij als een vogel"	9	9	9	27	3
3	Caylee	"Welkom in mijn leven"	10	10	12	32	2
4	Donny	"Showbizz"	12	12	10	34	1

==== Semi-final 2 ====
Semi-final 2 – 25 September 2010
Draw	Artist	Song	Kids Jury	Expert Jury	Televote	Total	Place
1	Anna & Senna	"My Family"	10	10	12	32	2
2	Darcey	"Energie"	9	8	8	25	4
3	Pip, Merel & Quinty	"You Tell Me"	8	9	9	26	3
4	Mano	"Ga niet meer weg"	12	12	10	34	1

==== Final ====
Final – 2 October 2010
Draw	Artist	Song	Kids Jury	Expert Jury	Televote	Total	Place
1	Donny	"Showbizz"	9	10	8	27	4
2	Caylee	"Welkom in mijn leven"	10	9	9	28	3
3	Pip, Merel & Quinty	"You Tell Me"	7	7	7	21	5
4	Mano	"Ga niet meer weg"	8	12	10	30	2
5	Anna & Senna	"My Family"	12	8	12	32	1

== At Junior Eurovision ==
=== Voting ===
Points awarded to the Netherlands
Score	Country
12 points (Note: All countries received one set of 12 points to ensure no country finished with nul points.)	
10 points	Belgium
8 points	Georgia
7 points	Serbia
6 points	
5 points	Armenia
4 points	
3 points	Latvia; Sweden
2 points	Lithuania
1 point	Belarus; Ukraine

Points awarded by the Netherlands
Score	Country
12 points	Belgium
10 points	Serbia
8 points	Russia
7 points	Georgia
6 points	Latvia
5 points	Armenia
4 points	Sweden
3 points	Belarus
2 points	Lithuania
1 point	Malta
