= René y René =

Tex-Mex pop music duo

René y René was a Latin pop duo from Laredo, Texas. Composed of René Ornelas (born August 26, 1936) and René Herrera (October 2, 1935 – December 20, 2005), the group scored two hit singles in the U.S. in the 1960s. 1964's "Angelito" ("Little Angel") peaked at #43 on the U.S. Billboard Hot 100 chart, and 1969's "Lo Mucho que Te Quiero (The More I Love You)" hit #2 on the Adult Contemporary chart, #14 on the Hot 100 chart, and #15 in Canada.

René y René were among the first Chicano artists to appear on American Bandstand (August 8, 1964). They were inducted into the Tejano Music Hall of Fame in 1990 and the Tejano ROOTS Hall of Fame in 2001.

René Ornelas was still performing (under the name "René René") as of 2010.

== Selected discography ==
Singles:

- Angelito / Write Me Soon 1964
- Little Vagabond / Little Peanuts 1964
- Yo Te Lo Dije (I Could Have Told You) / Pretty Flower Fade Away 1964
- Please Don't Bother / Undecided 1964
- Chantilly Lace / I'm Not The Only One (No Soy El Unico) 1965
- Loving You Could Hurt Me So / Little Diamonds 1965
- Lo Mucho Que Te Quiero (The More I Love You) / Mornin' 1968
- Las Cosas / You Will Cry 1969
- Enchilada Jose / Lloraras 1969
- Love Is For The Two Of Us / Sally Tosis 1969
- My Amigo Jose / Good Ole Days 1970

== See also ==
- List of 1960s one-hit wonders in the United States
