= Angelito (René y René song) =

1964 song by René y René

"Angelito" is a 1964 song written by René Herrera and René Ornelas, known as René y René. The song was one of the duo's greatest successes, and peaked at #43 on the US Hot 100.

== Cover Versions ==
The song was quickly covered by several other artists, among them:

- Trini Lopez 1964-on his "The Latin Album".
- The Bowmen 1964
- Herb Alpert's Tijuana Brass 1964-on their South of the Border LP.
- Martin Denny 1964
- Pierre Lalonde 1967
