= Candy (disambiguation) =

Candy is a type of sweet confectionery, typically prepared by dissolving sugar in water or milk and boiling it to concentrate the sugar.

Candy may also refer to:

== Name ==
- Candy (name), a list of people and fictional characters with the given name, nickname, stage name or surname

== Film and TV ==
- Candy (1968 film), a film based on the Southern and Hoffenberg novel
- Candy (2006 film), a film based on the Davies novel
- Candy (web series), a 2021 Indian web series
- Candy (miniseries), a 2022 American television miniseries

== Literature ==
- Candy (manga), a 2007 Japanese yaoi manga
- Candy (Brooks novel), a 2005 novel by Kevin Brooks
- Candy (Southern and Hoffenberg novel), a 1958 novel by Terry Southern and Mason Hoffenberg
- Candy: A Novel of Love and Addiction, a 1998 novel by Luke Davies

== Music ==
=== Groups ===
- Candy (band), mid-1980s American power-pop band
- Candy (group), a musical group from Georgia
- Candy (Malaysian band), an all-female rock band
- The Candy Band, an American punk-rock group for children
- Candy (hardcore band), an American hardcore punk from Richmond, VA.

=== Albums ===
- Candy (Chet Baker album) (1985)
- Candy (Con Funk Shun album) (1979)
- Candy (Mandy Moore album) (2005)
- Candy (Lee Morgan album) (1958)
- Candy (EP), by NCT Dream (2022)
- Candy, an album by Con Funk Shun (1979)
- Candy, a compilation album by Jo Stafford (2001)

=== Songs ===
- "Candy" (1944 song), a song popularized by Johnny Mercer and Jo Stafford
- "Candy" (Ash song), 2001
- "Candy" (Baekhyun song), 2020
- "Candy" (Foxy Brown song), 2001
- "Candy" (Cameo song), 1986
- "Candy" (Doja Cat song), 2018
- "Candy" (H.O.T. song), 1996; covered by NCT Dream in 2022
- "Candy" / "Molly's Lips", a 1991 split single by the Fluid and Nirvana
- "Candy" (Ken Hirai song), 2009
- "Candy" (Iggy Pop song), 1990
- "Candy" (Koda Kumi song), 2006
- "Candy" (LL Cool J song), 1998
- "Candy" (Mandy Moore song), 1999
- "Candy" (Paolo Nutini song), 2009
- "Candy" (Aggro Santos song), 2010
- "Candy (Drippin' Like Water)", a song by Snoop Dogg, 2006
- "Candy" (Robbie Williams song), 2012
- "Candy" (Rosalía song), 2022
- "Candy" (XO song), 2025
- "Candy", a song by Bikini Kill from Revolution Girl Style Now!, 1991
- "Candy", a song by Crystal Kay from 4 Real, 2003
- "Candy", a song by Don Toliver from Heaven or Hell, 2020
- "Candy", a song by Enon from Hocus Pocus, 2003
- "Candy", a song by Gavin DeGraw from Sweeter, 2011
- "Candy", a song by Riyu Kosaka from Begin, 2004
- "Candy", a song by Luv Unlimited in DDRMAX Dance Dance Revolution 6thMix and 7thMIX
- "Candy", a song by the Men from Open Your Heart, 2012
- "Candy", a song by Morphine from Cure for Pain, 1993
- "Candy", a song by the Presidents of the United States of America from their self-titled album, 1995
- "Candy", a song by Will Smith from Big Willie Style, 1997
- "Candy", a song by Machine Gun Kelly from the album Hotel Diablo, 2019
- "Candy", a song by The Blasting Company from their single, Candy, 2020
- "Candy", a song by Rico Nasty from the album Nightmare Vacation, 2020
- "Candy", a song by Twice from the album Formula of Love: O+T=<3, 2021
- "Candy", a song by Ravyn Lenae from the album Bird's Eye, 2024
- "Candy", a song by Nessa Barrett from the album Tough Love, 2026

== Places ==
- Crete or Candy, an island
- Kingdom of Kandy or Candy, a kingdom in what is now Sri Lanka
- Candy or Candia, Crete, the former name of Heraklion

== Other uses ==
- Candy (company), an Italian manufacturer of domestic appliances
- Candy (unit), a traditional South Asian unit of mass
- 3015 Candy, a main-belt asteroid
- Tropical Storm Candy, a 1968 storm
- Candy, the localized name of the character Honey in the Fighting Vipers series.
- Candy, the internal code name for the Atari 400 computer

== See also ==
- Caddy (disambiguation)
- Cande (disambiguation)
- Candi (disambiguation)
- Candies (disambiguation)
- Candy bar (disambiguation)
- Candy & Candy, property developers
- Candy Girl (disambiguation)
- Candyman (disambiguation)
- Hard Candy (disambiguation)
- Kandi (disambiguation)
- Kandy (disambiguation)
