= Moldova in the Junior Eurovision Song Contest 2011 =

- Junior Eurovision Song Contest 2011
- Country: Moldova
- Selection process: National final
- Selection date: 6 October 2011

Competing entry
- Song: "No, No"
- Artist: Lerika

Placement
- Final result: 6th, 78 points

Participation chronology

Moldova was represented at the Junior Eurovision Song Contest 2011, with their entry selected through a non-televised national selection.

== Before Junior Eurovision ==
=== National final ===
14 entries were submitted to TRM, which 5 were chosen to compete in the national final.

On 6 October 2011, the five entries were performed in front of a jury, which consisted of Geta Burlacu, Aura, Vitalie Rotaru, Sandu Gorgos and Vladimir Beleaev. Lerika was eventually selected as the Moldovan representative for the 2011 contest.

Artist	Song	Place
Lerika	"No, No"	1
Diana Sturza	"Soarele"	2
Paula Paraschiv	"Ce vîrsta ciudata"	3
Cornelia Vazian	"Povestea mea"	4
Alina Sorochina	"Despre tara"	5

== At Junior Eurovision ==
=== Voting ===
Points awarded to Moldova
Score	Country
12 points (Note: All countries received one set of 12 points to ensure no country finished with nul points.)	
10 points	Bulgaria
8 points	Belarus
7 points	Ukraine
6 points	Armenia; Macedonia; Russia
5 points	Belgium
4 points	Georgia; Latvia; Netherlands; Sweden
3 points	
2 points	Lithuania
1 point	

Points awarded by Moldova
Score	Country
12 points	Belarus
10 points	Netherlands
8 points	Georgia
7 points	Armenia
6 points	Lithuania
5 points	Macedonia
4 points	Bulgaria
3 points	Sweden
2 points	Latvia
1 point	Ukraine
