= Candi =

Candi may refer to:

- Candi of Indonesia, a type of Indonesian temple
- Candi, Sidoarjo, a subdistrict of Sidoarjo, East Java, Indonesia
- Candi & The Backbeat, a Canadian dance band, initially known as just Candi
- Candi (webcomic)
- Candi, a character on Max & Ruby
- Chandi (Caṇḍī), Hindu mother goddess
- An abbreviation for City and Islington College
- Candi sugar

== People ==
- Candi Devine (born 1959), American professional wrestler
- Candi Kubeck (1961–1996), American airline pilot
- Candi Milo (born 1961), American voice actress and singer
- Candi Staton (born 1940), American soul and gospel singer
- Cesare Candi (1869–1947), Italian luthier
- Leonardo Candi (born 1997), Italian basketball player
- Oreste Candi (1865–1938), Italian luthier

== See also ==
- Chandi (disambiguation)
- Cande (disambiguation)
- Candi bentar, a classical Javanese and Balinese gateway entrance
- Candy (disambiguation)
- Kandi (disambiguation)
- Kandy (disambiguation)
