= Armenia in the Junior Eurovision Song Contest 2011 =

- Junior Eurovision Song Contest 2011
- Participating broadcaster: Public Television Company of Armenia (ARMTV)
- Country: Armenia
- Selection process: National final
- Selection date: 17 September 2011

Competing entry
- Song: "Welcome to Armenia"
- Artist: Dalita
- Songwriters: Dalita Avanesian

Placement
- Final result: 5th, 85 points

Participation chronology

Armenia was represented at the Junior Eurovision Song Contest 2011 with the song "Welcome To Armenia", written and performed by Dalita. The Armenian participating broadcaster, Public Television Company of Armenia (ARMTV), selected its entry for the contest through a televised national final, held on 17 September 2011. In addition, ARMTV was also the host broadcaster and staged the event at the Karen Demirchyan Sports and Concerts Complex in Yerevan.

== Before Junior Eurovision ==
=== National final ===
A submission period for artists was held from 21 June 2011 until 20 August 2011. The broadcaster received 135 submissions, and the twelve finalists were revealed on 10 September 2011, with the running order draw taking place on the same day at the Dolphinarium in Yerevan.

==== Final ====
The final took place on 17 September 2011. The winner was decided through a combination of SMS voting (50%), and an "expert" jury (50%).

Final – 17 September 2011
R/O	Artist	Song	Place
1	Razmik & Friends	"Yes sirum em kez"	3
2	Milena Vardanyan	"Stop"	—N/a
3	Maria Yenoqyan	"Nor erg"	—N/a
4	Petros Ghazaryan	"Im erazanq"	—N/a
5	Ninela Mkhitaryan	"Notaneri ashkharkum"	—N/a
6	Tatev Engibaryan	"Hayeren"	2
7	Do-Re-Mi	"Dance With Me"	—N/a
8	Nadezhda Sargsyan	"Tik-Tak"	—N/a
9	Allegro	"Bnutyan hrashkner"	—N/a
10	Meri Arzumanyan	"Pari ritmer"	—N/a
11	Monika Navasardyan	"Slatsik qami"	—N/a
12	Dalita	"Welcome To Armenia"	1
13	Anahit Hakobyan	"Balet"	—N/a
14	Sona Gyulkhasyan	"Togh"	—N/a
15	Milli	"Milli-On"	—N/a
16	Vahagn Grigoryan	"Mer bake"	—N/a

== At Eurovision ==
=== Voting ===
Points awarded to Armenia
Score	Country
12 points (Note: All countries received one set of 12 points to ensure no country finished with nul points.)	
10 points	Georgia; Ukraine
8 points	Russia; Sweden
7 points	Belgium; Macedonia; Moldova
6 points	
5 points	Belarus; Bulgaria; Netherlands
4 points	
3 points	
2 points	
1 point	Latvia

Points awarded by Armenia
Score	Country
12 points	Georgia
10 points	Russia
8 points	Belarus
7 points	Netherlands
6 points	Moldova
5 points	Ukraine
4 points	Sweden
3 points	Belgium
2 points	Lithuania
1 point	Bulgaria
