= Bulgaria in the Junior Eurovision Song Contest 2011 =

- Junior Eurovision Song Contest 2011
- Country: Bulgaria
- Selection process: Konkurs za detska pesen na Evroviziya 2011
- Selection date: Semi-final: 17 September 2011; Final: 2 October 2011

Competing entry
- Song: "Supergeroy"
- Artist: Ivan Ivanov
- Songwriters: Ivan Ivanov

Placement
- Final result: 8th, 60 points

Participation chronology

Bulgaria selected their Junior Eurovision Song Contest 2011 entry through the national selection "Konkurs za detska pesen na Evroviziya 2011". The winner was Ivan Ivanov with the song "Supergeroy". He represented Bulgaria in the contest where he placed 8th with 60 points.

== Before Junior Eurovision ==
=== Konkurs za detska pesen na Evroviziya 2011 ===
Konkurs za detska pesen na Evroviziya 2011 was the national final format developed by BNT in order to select Bulgaria's entry for the Junior Eurovision Song Contest 2011. Both shows took place at the BNT studios in Sofia, hosted by Joanna Dragneva and Krisko.

==== Competing entries ====
Artists and songwriters were able to submit their entries from 16 August 2011 to 12 September 2011. BNT received 21 entries, and a seven-member jury panel selected fifteen songs for the competition. The jury panel consisted of:

- Boris Karadimchev – composer, founder of the famous children's vocal group "Pim-Pam"
- Haigashod Agasyan – composer
- Maya Raykova – music editor from the Bulgarian National Radio
- Angel Zaberski – musician, conductor, composer
- Vyara Panteleeva – pop singer
- Nikolai Dogramadjiev – actor, singer and television presenter
- Teodora Popova – director

Results of the Audition Round – 14 September 2011
Draw	Artist	Song	Songwriter(s)
1	Slavena Hristova Rodinova	"Tijnejdzherski svjat"	Unknown
2	Slavena Hristova Rodinova & Aleksandar Aleksandrov Tanev	"Az moga"	Unknown
3	Adriana Antonova Antonova	"Dobro"	Unknown
4	Darija Todorova Boeva	"Shtarkelite doletjaha"	Kiril Manolov, Ivan Manolov
5	Tsveta Marinova, Petja Dimova & Nikolaj Markov	"Mechta"	Nikolaj Markov, Georgi Dzheljanov, Petja Dimova
6	Ivelin Trakijski	"Zavistta"	Ivelin Trakijski
7	Gergana Aleksandrova	"Prosto duma"	Unknown
8	Peeshtite Kengura	"Sto stari neshta"	Svetoslav Loboshki, Maja Dlagacheva
9	Rustam Gubkin-Matejski	"Moga"	Petar Pesev, Irena Matejska-Gubkina, Radoslava Dimova
10	New Voices	"Be My Friend"	Valeri Kostov, Kristiana Asenova, Nikolaj Georgiev, Desislava Staniova
11	Zornitsa, Blagovesta Ivanova, Emilijan Georgiev & Lora Nestorova	"Az iskam"	Galina Ivanova
12	Adriana Mihajlova	"A-B-V v zooparka"	Unknown
13	Dega & Mariam Mavrova	"Chuden san"	Miriam Mavrova, Vasil Deliev
14	Formation "Yanbabiyantsi"	"Rok mechta"	Samanta Kalcheva, Lilija Simeonova
15	Daniela Ilieva	"S magija"	Daniela Ilieva, Daniela Stankova, Georgi Krasimirov-Gerasim
16	Ivan Ivanov	"Supergeroy"	Ivan Ivanov
17	Shareno Gardanche	"Da dostignem verha"	Janitsa Stamenova, Sonja Milanova, Raja Hristova, Svetla Stamenova
18	Chudnite Kalinki	"Da poletja"	Chudnite kalinki, Elena Georgieva
19	Charovni Usmivki	"Parti pesen"	Tsvetelina Gadzhelova, Eliana Kapitanska
20	Charovni Usmivki	"Vazhvala na bulgarskata narodna pesen"	Unknown
21	Morski Pesechinki	"Sinja pesen"	Ruslan Karagiozov, Vanio Valchev

==== Semi-final ====
The semi-final took place on 17 September 2011. Fifteen songs competed and the top ten entries as determined by the jury panel advanced to the final.

Semi-final – 17 September 2011
Draw	Artist	Song	Result
1	Darija Todorova Boeva	"Shtarkelite doletjaha"	Eliminated
2	Tsveta Marinova, Petja Dimova & Nikolaj Markov	"Mechta"	Eliminated
3	Ivelin Trakijski	"Zavistta"	Advanced
4	Peeshtite Kengura	"Sto stari neshta"	Advanced
5	Rustam Gubkin-Matejski	"Moga"	Advanced
6	New Voices	"Be My Friend"	Advanced
7	Zornitsa, Blagovesta Ivanova, Emilijan Georgiev & Lora Nestorova	"Az iskam"	Eliminated
8	Dega & Mariam Mavrova	"Chuden san"	Advanced
9	Formation "Yanbabiyantsi"	"Rok mechta"	Eliminated
10	Daniela Ilieva	"S magija"	Advanced
11	Ivan Ivanov	"Supergeroy"	Advanced
12	Shareno Gardanche	"Da dostignem verha"	Advanced
13	Chudnite Kalinki	"Da poletja"	Eliminated
14	Charovni Usmivki	"Parti pesen"	Advanced
15	Morski Pesechinki	"Sinja pesen"	Advanced

==== Final ====
The final took place on 2 October 2011. Ten songs consisting of the ten semi-final winners competed and the winner was determined by a 50/50 combination of points awarded by SMS voting and the jury panel.

Final – 2 October 2011
Draw	Artist	Song	Jury	Televote	Total	Place
1	Peeshtite Kengura	"Sto stari neshta"	12	7	19	2
2	Daniela Ilieva	"S magija"	–	–	–	–
3	Shareno Gardanche	"Da dostignem verha"	–	–	–	–
4	Rustam Gubkin-Matejski	"Moga"	–	–	–	–
5	New Voices	"Be My Friend"	–	–	–	–
6	Charovni Usmivki	"Parti pesen"	–	8	–	–
7	Ivelin Trakijski	"Zavistta"	8	–	–	–
8	Dega & Mariam Mavrova	"Chuden san"	5	12	17	3
9	Ivan Ivanov	"Supergeroy"	10	10	20	1
10	Morski Pesechinki	"Sinja pesen"	–	–	–	–

== At Junior Eurovision ==
=== Voting ===
The voting during the final consisted of 50 percent public televoting and 50 percent from a jury deliberation. The jury consisted of five music industry professionals who were citizens of the country they represent. This jury was asked to judge each contestant based on: vocal capacity; the stage performance; the song's composition and originality; and the overall impression by the act. In addition, no member of a national jury could be related in any way to any of the competing acts in such a way that they cannot vote impartially and independently.

Below is a breakdown of points awarded to Bulgaria and awarded by Bulgaria in the final.

Points awarded to Bulgaria
Score	Country
12 points (Note: All countries received one set of 12 points to ensure no country finished with nul points.)	Macedonia
10 points	
8 points	
7 points	
6 points	Belarus; Georgia
5 points	Sweden
4 points	Belgium; Moldova
3 points	Netherlands; Ukraine
2 points	Latvia; Russia
1 point	Armenia

Points awarded by Bulgaria
Score	Country
12 points	Russia
10 points	Moldova
8 points	Netherlands
7 points	Belgium
6 points	Georgia
5 points	Armenia
4 points	Belarus
3 points	Sweden
2 points	Macedonia
1 point	Ukraine
