= Netherlands in the Junior Eurovision Song Contest 2011 =

2011 Junior Eurovision participation

- Junior Eurovision Song Contest 2011
- Country: Netherlands
- Selection process: Junior Songfestival 2011; 33% Jury; 33% Kids Jury; 33% Televoting
- Selection date: Semi Final: 17 September 2011; 24 September 2011; Final: 1 October 2011

Competing entry
- Song: "Teenager"
- Artist: Rachel Traets

Placement
- Final result: 2nd, 103 points

Participation chronology

Netherlands selected their Junior Eurovision entry for 2011 through Junior Songfestival, a national selection consisting of 8 songs. The winner was Rachel with the song "Teenager".

== Before Junior Eurovision ==
=== Junior Songfestival 2011 ===
The songs were split into two semi finals. From each semi final two sentries will qualify for the final based on the decision of adult and children juries as well as televoting. The fifth entry in the final will be chosen by online voting (web wildcard).

==== Semi Final 1 ====
Semi-final 1 – 17 September 2011
Draw	Artist	Song	Kids Jury	Expert Jury	Televote	Total	Place
1	Sera	"Never give up"	9	8	8	25	4
2	Yassir	"Beautiful"	10	10	9	29	2
3	Polle	"Music in my heart"	8	9	10	27	3
4	Rachel	"Ik ben een Teenager"	12	12	12	36	1

==== Semi Final 2 ====
Semi-final 2 – 24 September 2011
Draw	Artist	Song	Kids Jury	Expert Jury	Televote	Total	Place
1	Lidewei	"Dit is wat ik wil"	10	9	10	29	2
2	JuNMe	"Magie"	8	8	8	24	4
3	Joël	"Ik denk aan jou"	12	12	12	36	1
4	Noah	"Twitterqueen"	9	10	9	28	3

==== Final ====
Final – 1 October 2011
Draw	Artist	Song	Kids Jury	Expert Jury	Televote	Total	Place
1	Yassir	"Beautiful"	9	9	10	28	2
2	Sera	"Never give up"	10	7	7	24	5
3	Joël	"Ik denk aan jou"	7	8	9	24	4
4	Rachel	"Ik ben een teenager"	12	12	12	36	1
5	Lidewei	"Dit is wat ik wil"	8	10	8	26	3

== At Junior Eurovision ==
=== Voting ===
Points awarded to the Netherlands
Score	Country
12 points (Note: All countries received one set of 12 points to ensure no country finished with nul points.)	Belgium; Latvia
10 points	Belarus; Moldova; Sweden
8 points	Bulgaria
7 points	Armenia; Russia
6 points	Lithuania
5 points	Ukraine
4 points	
3 points	
2 points	Georgia; Macedonia
1 point	

Points awarded by the Netherlands
Score	Country
12 points	Belgium
10 points	Georgia
8 points	Belarus
7 points	Russia
6 points	Sweden
5 points	Armenia
4 points	Moldova
3 points	Bulgaria
2 points	Ukraine
1 point	Macedonia
