= Hard Candy =

Hard Candy may refer to:

- Hard candy, a type of candy made to dissolve slowly in the mouth
- Hard Candy (cosmetics), an American cosmetics company

== Music ==
- Hard Candy (Counting Crows album) or the title song, 2002
- Hard Candy (Madonna album), 2008
- Hard Candy (Ned Doheny album), 1976
- "Hard Candy", a song by Blue October from Sway, 2013

== Other media ==
- Hard Candy (film), a 2005 film directed by David Slade
- Hard Candy: A Book of Stories, a 1954 collection by Tennessee Williams
- Hard Candy, a 1989 novel in the Burke series by Andrew Vachss

== See also ==
- Candies (disambiguation)
- Candy (disambiguation)
- Rock candy, also known as sugar candy (in British English), or rock sugar
