= Candyman =

Candyman often refers to a person who creates confectionery.

Candyman or Candy Man may also refer to:

== Film, television and comics ==
- Candyman (character), villain of:
  - Candyman (film series), a horror film franchise, consisting of four films:
    - Candyman (1992 film)
    - Candyman: Farewell to the Flesh (1995 film)
    - Candyman: Day of the Dead (1999 film)
    - Candyman (2021 film)
- Candyman (2010 film), a documentary about David Klein, originator of Jelly Belly jelly beans
- The Candy Man (film), a 1969 crime thriller film

== Music ==
=== Albums ===
- Candyman (album), by Steve Lukather
- The Candy Man, by Mississippi John Hurt

=== Songs ===
- "Candyman" (Christina Aguilera song)
- "Candyman" (Grateful Dead song)
- "Candyman" (Ratcat song)
- "Candyman" (Siouxsie & the Banshees song)
- "The Candy Man", from the 1971 film Willy Wonka & the Chocolate Factory, notably covered by Sammy Davis Jr.
- "Candy Man" (Roy Orbison song)
- "Candyman", by Primus
- "Candy Man", by Brown Eyed Girls
- "Candy Man", by Suzi Quatro from Main Attraction
- "Candyman", by Cornershop from When I Was Born for the 7th Time
- "Candyman", by Da Boy Tommy; an Ultratop 50 number-one hit of 2000 in Belgium
- "Candyman", by Kahimi Karie from Kahimi Karie
- "Candy Man", by the Mary Jane Girls from Mary Jane Girls
- "Candyman", by Pitbull from The Boatlift
- "Candy Man", by Reverend Gary Davis; covered by Hot Tuna on First Pull Up, Then Pull Down
- "Candy Man", by Donovan from Fairytale
- "Candyman", by Spacehog from Resident Alien
- "Candyman", by Vertical Horizon from Running on Ice
- "Candy Man Blues", by Mississippi John Hurt
- "The Candy Man", a 1988 song by American rock band Uncle Sam
- "Lollipop (Candyman)", by Aqua

=== Performers ===
- Candyman (rapper), an American rap artist
- Candyman (singer), a Cuban reggaeton singer

== People ==
=== Nickname ===
- Zeca Baleiro, Brazilian singer and guitarist José Ribamar Coelho Santos (born 1966), nicknamed "Baleiro" ("Candyman")
- Kyle Busch (1985–2026), American racing driver
- John Candelaria (born 1953), American baseball pitcher
- Tom Candiotti (born 1957), American baseball pitcher
- Dean Corll (1939–1973), American serial killer, rapist and pederast
- Sam Hyde (born 1985), American comedian
- Candy Maldonado (born 1960), American baseball player
- Ronald Clark O'Bryan (1944–1984), American murderer of his own son using poisoned candy
- Lamar Odom (born 1979), American basketball player

=== Other ===
- a ring name of Brad Armstrong (wrestler), American professional wrestler
- Candyman, a pseudonym for one of The Humble Guys, a cracking group for the IBM PC

== Fictional characters ==
- Candyman (character), the antagonist of the Candyman franchise
- Officer Conrad "Candyman" Jones, a recurring police officer from the television series Third Watch
- Greg Candyman, a character from the Cars film series
- Candyman, a character in Season 3 of the television series Fringe
- Candyman, in the comics series The Tick, a member of the supervillain team The Phalanx of Gloom
- Candy Man, the version of Popeye (an amalgamation of him and two other characters) in the 1961 film Sanctuary

== See also ==
- The Kandyman, a robot from the Doctor Who serial The Happiness Patrol
- The Candymen, an American band
- Candy (disambiguation)
