= Kandis =

Kandis may refer to:

- Kandis (Kingdom), an ancient kingdom in Sumatra, Indonesia
- Rock candy, confectionery mineral composed of large sugar crystals
- Kandis (band), Danish dance band
- Garcinia forbesii, a plant with the common name kandis

== See also ==
- Kandi (disambiguation)
- Kändisdjungeln, the first season of the Swedish version of I'm a Celebrity...Get Me Out of Here!
- Kandis Kola, a village in Panjak-e Rastaq Rural District, Kojur District, Nowshahr County, Mazandaran Province, Iran
