= Kandi =

Kandi may refer to:

== Places ==
=== Benin ===
- Kandi, Benin, a town, arrondissement, and commune, and three arrondissements under its jurisdiction:
  - Kandi I
  - Kandi II
  - Kandi III

=== India ===
- Kandi, Garhwa, a village in Jharkhand
- Kandi, Murshidabad, a town in West Bengal
  - Kandi subdivision
  - Kandi (community development block)
  - Kandi Assembly constituency
- Kandi, Sangareddy, a mandal in Telangana

=== Iran ===
- Kandi, Ardabil, a village
- Baghestan-e Kandehi, or Kandi, a village in Fars Province

== People and fictional characters ==
- Kandi Burruss (born 1976), American rhythm and blues singer/songwriter
- Kandi Wyatt (born 1991), Canadian boxer
- Daniel Kandi (born 1983), Danish trance producer and DJ
- Ibrahim Wisan (born 1977), Maldivian cinematographer, actor and director nicknamed Kandi
- Kandi Harper, a character in the American sitcom Two and a Half Men

== Other uses ==
- Kandi Technologies, a Chinese manufacturer of electric cars
- Kandi bracelet, often worn at American raves
- "Kandi", a song by Arash from Donya

== See also ==
- Candi (disambiguation)
- Candy (disambiguation)
- Kandy (disambiguation)
- Kandis (disambiguation)
