= Moldova in the Junior Eurovision Song Contest =

- Junior Eurovision Song Contest
- Participating broadcaster: Teleradio-Moldova (TRM)

Participation summary
- Appearances: 4
- First appearance: 2010
- Last appearance: 2013
- Highest placement: 6th: 2011
- Participation history: 2010; 2011; 2012; 2013; 2014 – 2025
- For the most recent participation see Moldova in the Junior Eurovision Song Contest 2013

Moldova has been represented at the Junior Eurovision Song Contest since 2010. The Moldovan participating broadcaster in the contest is Teleradio-Moldova (TRM). On 30 June 2010, TRM announced its debut in the Junior Eurovision Song Contest. They were the first country making its debut since Armenia, Bulgaria, Georgia and Lithuania debuted in 2007. Since 2010 Moldova took part four times in the contest, including 2013.

== History ==
On 28 July 2010, the EBU announced that Moldova would make its debut at the Junior Eurovision contest, in Minsk, Belarus. The participating broadcaster being TRM. Later, TRM would host a national final for the 2010 contest named, "Eurovisionul copiilor." The final of Eurovisionul copiilor took place on 25 September 2010, and shortly after, Ștefan Roșcovan won the show with the song "Ali Baba." He would later place 8th with 54 points in Minsk.

Moldova continued its participation into the 2011 contest, in Yerevan, Armenia. TRM held another National final on 6 October 2011. After the National Final, Lerika won the selection with the song, "No, No." she would later place 6th in Yerevan, giving, as of 2026, Moldovas best result in the Junior Contest.

For 2012, TRM held another National final on 4 October 2012. After the Final took place, Denis Midone won the selection with the song "Toate vor fi" He would later place 10th with 52 points in Amsterdam, Netherlands.

In 2013, TRM held "Selecția Națională 2013" on 20 October 2013. Rafael Bobeica won with the song "Cum să fim." Bobeica would later place 11th with 41 points in Kyiv, Ukraine, giving, as of 2026, Moldova its worst result.

After the 2013 contest, Moldova withdrew. With TRM giving no response for the withdrawal. As of 2026, Moldova has been inactive since and TRM has never released a statement regarding Junior Eurovision participation since. This means that Moldova's withdrawal has stayed a mystery and not much is known to the public.

On 12 November 2026, TRM announced that it is considering returning to Junior Eurovision in 2027, however it is unknown when a decision will be made.

== Participation overview ==
Year	Artist	Song	Language	Place	Points
2010	Ștefan Roșcovan	"Ali Baba"	Romanian, English	8	54
2011	Lerika	"No, No"	Romanian, English	6	78
2012	Denis Midone	"Toate vor fi"	Romanian, English	10	52
2013	Rafael Bobeica	"Cum să fim"	Romanian, English	11	41

=== Photogallery ===
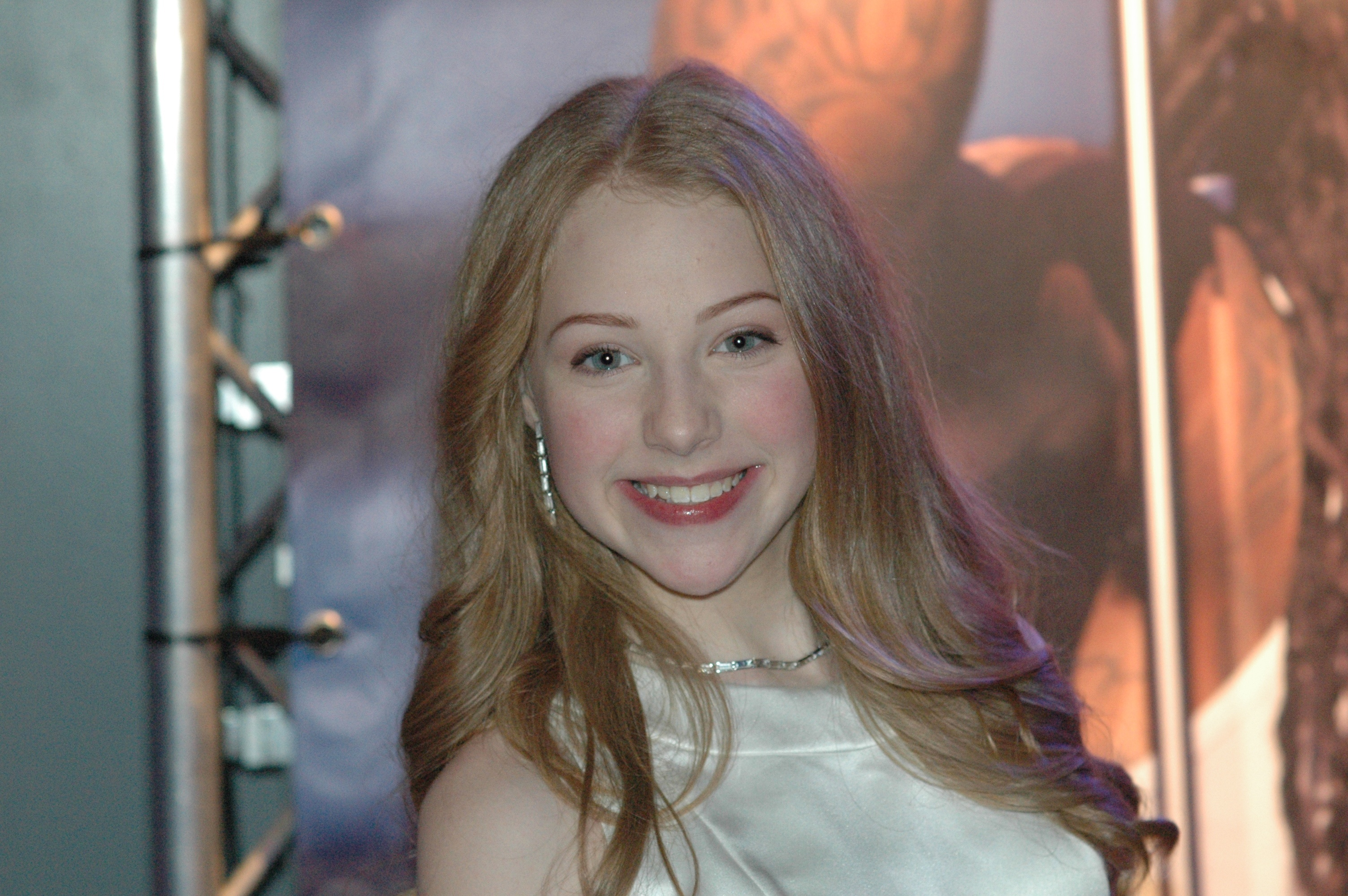
Lerika (2011 participant)

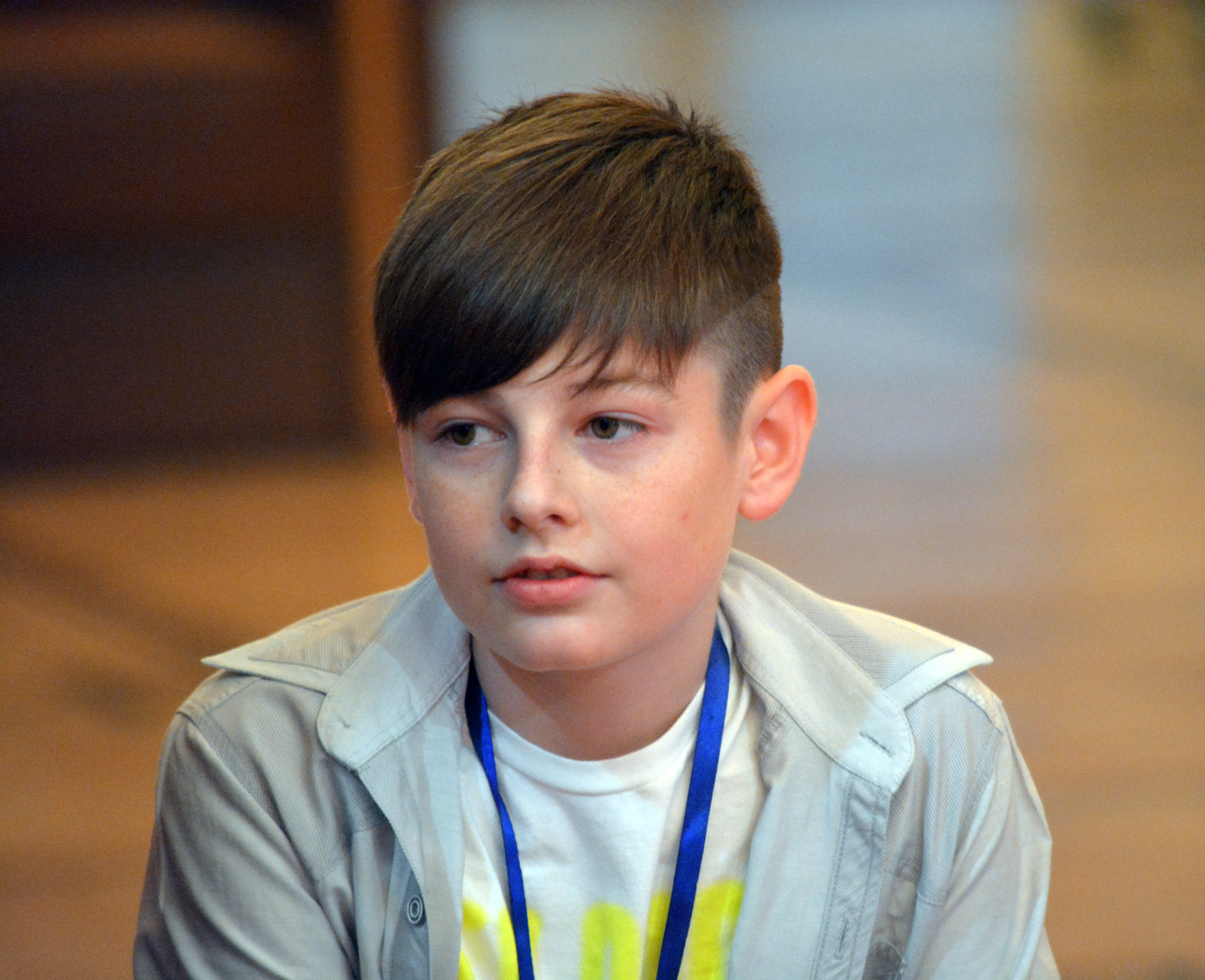
Denis Midone (2012 participant)

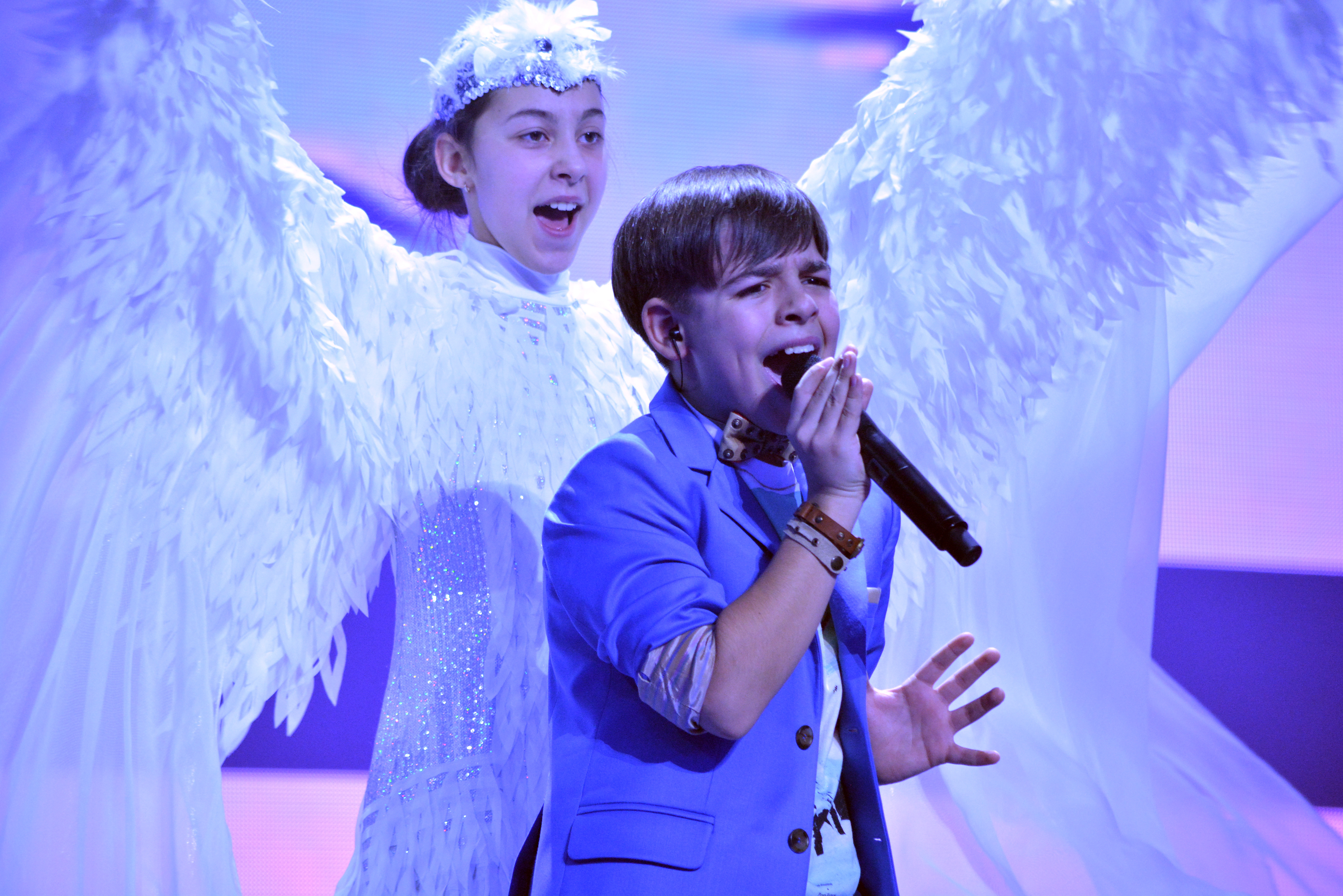
Rafael Bobeica at Junior Eurovision Song Contest 2013, Kyiv

== Commentators and spokespersons ==
Year(s)	Commentator	Spokesperson
2010	Rusalina Rusu	Paula Paraschiv
2011	Rusalina Rusu	Ștefănel Roșcovan
2012	Rusalina Rusu	Felcia Genunchi
2013	Rusalina Rusu	Denis Midone
2014–2026	No broadcast	Did not participate

== See also ==
- Moldova in the Eurovision Song Contest
