= Kande =

Kande may refer to:

- Kande (film), a 2018 Indian Punjabi-language film
- Kandé, a town in Togo
- Kande (Nepal), a village in Nepal
- Kande language, a language of Gabon
- Electric blue kande, a fish of family Cichlidae
- Garmine Kande (born 1999), Congolese basketballer
- Moïse Kandé (born 1978), Senegalese-Mauritanian footballer

== See also ==
- Kandeh
- Cande (disambiguation)
