= Belarus in the Junior Eurovision Song Contest 2011 =

- Junior Eurovision Song Contest 2011
- Country: Belarus
- Selection process: Song for Europe
- Selection date: 23 September 2011

Competing entry
- Song: "Angely dobra"
- Artist: Lidiya Zablotskaya

Placement
- Final result: 3rd, 99 points

Participation chronology

Belarus was represented at the Junior Eurovision Song Contest 2011. The Belarusian entry for the 2011 contest was selected through the national final Song for Europe, organised by the Belarusian broadcaster National State Television and Radio Company of the Republic of Belarus.

== Before Junior Eurovision ==
=== Song for Europe ===
The 10 acts that will participate in the national final were announced on 25 August 2011. The national final took place on 23 September 2011 in Minsk, broadcast live from BTRC. Ten acts competed, where the winner was determined by a 50/50 combination of the votes of a jury made up of music professionals and regional televoting.

Final – 23 September 2011
Draw	Artist	Song	Jury	Televote		Total	Place
Draw	Artist	Song	Jury	Votes	Points	Total	Place
8	Daria Atroshenko	"A-a!!!"	5	37	3	8	7
3	Alexandra Drozdova	"Pesnya Krasnoy shapochki"	7	45	5	12	5
9	Anna Zaitseva	"Moim druz'yami"	3	51	7	10	6
7	Valery Ziborov & Yana Fedorova	"Pesnya dlya dvoih"	4	41	4	8	8
2	Lidiya Zablotskaya	"Angely dobra"	12	63	10	22	1
10	Egor Zheshko	"Solnechnaya ostrov"	10	50	6	16	2
6	Alexei Kuzmin	"Bud' soboj"	2	67	12	14	4
4	Maria Novik	"Solnechnaya pesenka"	8	51	8	16	3
5	Veronica Sokolovskaya	"Karnaval"	1	27	2	3	10
1	Diana Tsekhovich	"Ya risyu"	6	24	1	7	9

Detailed Regional Televoting Results
Draw	Song	Bonus	Brest	Vitebsk	Gomel	Grodno	Mogilev	Minsk	Total
8	"A-a!!!"	12	5	5	1	7	1	6	37
3	"Pesnya Krasnoy shapochki"	12	6	6	6	6	6	3	45
9	"Moim druz'yami"	12	4	8	4	3	10	10	51
7	"Pesnya dlya dvoih"	12	3	12	5	4	4	1	41
2	"Angely dobra"	12	7	4	8	12	12	8	63
10	"Solnechnaya ostrov"	12	10	1	7	10	5	5	50
6	"Bud' soboj"	12	12	10	10	8	8	7	67
4	"Solnechnaya pesenka"	12	8	7	12	5	7	12	51
5	"Karnaval"	12	2	3	2	1	3	4	27
1	"Ya risyu"	12	1	2	3	2	2	2	24

== Artist and song information ==
=== Lidiya Zablotskaya ===
Lidiya Zablotskaya (Russian: Лидия Заблоцкая, Romanized: Lidiya Zablotskaya; Belarusian: Лідзія Заблоцкая, Romanized: Lidzija Zablockaja) is a Belarusian singer. She represented Belarus in the Junior Eurovision Song Contest 2011 in Armenia with the song Angely dobra.

Lidiya participated at the national selection to Junior Eurovision Song Contest 2010 but finished fourth. In the Junior Eurovision Song Contest 2011, she got third place at finals with 99 points.

As of 2022 she now works as a cultural reporter for Belarus-1.

== At Junior Eurovision ==
=== Voting ===
Points awarded to Belarus
Score	Country
12 points (Note: All countries received one set of 12 points to ensure no country finished with nul points.)	Moldova; Russia; Ukraine
10 points	
8 points	Armenia; Georgia; Lithuania; Netherlands
7 points	Latvia
6 points	
5 points	
4 points	Bulgaria
3 points	Macedonia; Sweden
2 points	Belgium
1 point	

Points awarded by Belarus
Score	Country
12 points	Georgia
10 points	Netherlands
8 points	Moldova
7 points	Russia
6 points	Bulgaria
5 points	Armenia
4 points	Lithuania
3 points	Macedonia
2 points	Ukraine
1 point	Belgium
