= Belgium in the Junior Eurovision Song Contest 2011 =

National selection of songs for Junior Eurosong

- Junior Eurovision Song Contest 2011
- Participating broadcaster: Vlaamse Radio- en Televisieomroeporganisatie (VRT)
- Country: Belgium
- Selection process: Junior Eurosong 2011
- Selection date: 30 September 2011

Competing entry
- Song: "Een kusje meer"
- Artist: Femke
- Songwriters: Peter Gillis; Vincent Goeminne; Femke Verschueren

Placement
- Final result: 7th, 64 points

Participation chronology

Belgium was represented at the Junior Eurovision Song Contest 2011 with the song "Een kusje meer", written by Peter Gillis, Vincent Goeminne, and Femke Verschueren, and performed by Femke. The Belgian participating broadcaster, Vlaamse Radio- en Televisieomroeporganisatie (VRT), selected its entry for the contest through a national televised competition titled Junior Eurosong 2011.

== Before Junior Eurovision ==
=== Junior Eurosong 2011 ===
Junior Eurosong 2011 was the 8-song national competition organised by Belgian broadcaster Vlaamse Radio- en Televisieomroeporganisatie (VRT) to select its entry for the Junior Eurovision Song Contest 2011.

Before the final, four semi-finals were held with two songs each. A three-member jury panel consisting of Miguel Wiels, Tom Dice and Eva Daelemans selected the winning entry of each semi-final to qualify for the final. In the final, the winner was selected via a 50/50 combination of jury voting and public televoting.

==== Semi-final 1 ====
The first semi-final took place on 26 September 2011. Two of the competing entries performed, and a three-member jury panel selected the winning entry to qualify for the final.

Semi-final 1 – 26 September 2011
| R/O | Artist | Artist | Result |
|---|---|---|---|
| 1 | Evelyn | "Music and Me" | —N/a |
| 2 | Alexandra | "Big Bang" | Qualified |

==== Semi-final 2 ====
The second semi-final took place on 27 September 2011. Two of the competing entries performed, and a three-member jury panel selected the winning entry to qualify for the final.

Semi-final 2 – 27 September 2011
| R/O | Artist | Song | Result |
|---|---|---|---|
| 1 | Femke | "Een kusje meer" | Qualified |
| 2 | Seppe | "Hey hallo jij!" | —N/a |

==== Semifinal 3 ====
The third semi-final took place on 28 September 2011. Two of the competing entries performed, and a three-member jury panel selected the winning entry to qualify for the final.

Semi-final 3 – 28 September 2011
| R/O | Artist | Song | Result |
|---|---|---|---|
| 1 | Naomi | "Niemand krijgt ons klein" | Qualified |
| 2 | Ciska | "Disco Jojo" | —N/a |

==== Semifinal 4 ====
The fourth semi-final took place on 29 September 2011. Two of the competing entries performed, and a three-member jury panel selected the winning entry to qualify for the final.

Semi-final 4 – 29 September 2011
| R/O | Artist | Song | Result |
|---|---|---|---|
| 1 | Vince | "Freedom“ | Qualified |
| 2 | Flor | "Ze is nog niet van mij” | —N/a |

==== Final ====
The final took place on 30 September 2011. The winner was selected via a 50/50 combination of jury voting and public televoting.

Final – 30 September 2011
| R/O | Artist | Song | Place |
|---|---|---|---|
| 1 | Vince | "Freedom" | 3 |
| 2 | Naomi | "Niemand krijgt ons klein" | 2 |
| 3 | Alexandra | "Big Bang" | 4 |
| 4 | Femke | "Een Kusje Meer" | 1 |

== At Junior Eurovision ==
=== Voting ===
Points awarded to Belgium
| Score | Country |
|---|---|
| 12 points (Note: All countries received one set of 12 points to ensure no country finished with nul points.) | Netherlands |
| 10 points | |
| 8 points | |
| 7 points | Bulgaria; Sweden |
| 6 points | |
| 5 points | Georgia; Latvia |
| 4 points | Macedonia |
| 3 points | Armenia; Lithuania; Russia |
| 2 points | Ukraine |
| 1 point | Belarus |

Points awarded by Belgium
| Score | Country |
|---|---|
| 12 points | Netherlands |
| 10 points | Russia |
| 8 points | Sweden |
| 7 points | Armenia |
| 6 points | Georgia |
| 5 points | Moldova |
| 4 points | Bulgaria |
| 3 points | Ukraine |
| 2 points | Belarus |
| 1 point | Latvia |
