= Lithuania in the Junior Eurovision Song Contest 2011 =

- Junior Eurovision Song Contest 2011
- Country: Lithuania
- Selection process: Vaikų Eurovizijos nacionalinė atranka
- Selection date: 18 September 2011

Competing entry
- Song: "Debesys"
- Artist: Paulina Skrabytė

Placement
- Final result: 10th, 53 points

Participation chronology

Lithuanian broadcaster LRT announced their participation for Junior Eurovision Song Contest 2011 in September 2011. The National Final, "Vaiku Eurovizija" chose Paulina Skrabytė to represent Lithuania in the Junior Eurovision Song Contest 2011.

== Before Junior Eurovision ==
=== Vaikų Eurovizijos nacionalinė atranka ===
The final was held on 18 September 2011 at the LRT TV Studios in Vilnius, where 11 participants competed. The winner was chosen in two rounds of voting. In the first round the top 3 were chosen by televoting (50%) & a seven-member "expert" jury (50%), while in the second round the winner was chosen by the "expert" jury.

The jury that voted in the final included Jonas Vilimas, Asta Einikytė, Eglė Nepaitė, Donatas Montvydas, Artūras Novikas, Edmundas Seilius and Kristina Zmailaitė.

Final – 18 September 2011
| Draw | Artist | Song | Jury | Public | | Total | Place |
| Draw | Artist | Song | Jury | Televote | Points | Total | Place |
|---|---|---|---|---|---|---|---|
| 1 | Štai | "Geros dienos" | 8 | 137 | 1 | 9 | 7 |
| 2 | Dominykas Kovaliovas | "Kodėl?" | 3 | 97 | 0 | 3 | 10 |
| 3 | Agnė Lukaševičiūtė | "Balti sparnai" | 2 | 1421 | 10 | 12 | 4 |
| 4 | Gabrielė Rybko | "Beždžioniukai" | 5 | 140 | 2 | 7 | 8 |
| 5 | Dorotėja Kravčenkaitė | "Aš skrisiu" | 0 | 201 | 3 | 3 | 10 |
| 6 | Daumantas Bagdonavičius | "Namai" | 4 | 1357 | 8 | 12 | 4 |
| 7 | Paulina Skrabytė | "Debesys" | 12 | 311 | 6 | 18 | 2 |
| 8 | Laura Kastanauskaitė | "Mano šokis" | 6 | 242 | 4 | 10 | 6 |
| 9 | Bernardas Garbačiauskas | "Namo" | 7 | 899 | 7 | 14 | 3 |
| 10 | Ieva Binevičiūtė | "Pasakyk" | 1 | 298 | 5 | 6 | 9 |
| 11 | Milita Daikerytė | "Degu ritmu" | 10 | 1688 | 12 | 22 | 1 |

Superfinal – 18 September 2011
| Draw | Artist | Song |
|---|---|---|
| 1 | Paulina Skrabytė | "Debesys" |
| 2 | Bernardas Garbačiauskas | "Namo" |
| 3 | Milita Daikerytė | "Degu ritmu" |

== At Junior Eurovision ==
=== Voting ===
Points awarded to Lithuania
| Score | Country |
|---|---|
| 12 points (Note: All countries received one set of 12 points to ensure no country finished with nul points.) | Georgia |
| 10 points | Macedonia |
| 8 points | |
| 7 points | |
| 6 points | Latvia; Moldova |
| 5 points | |
| 4 points | Belarus |
| 3 points | |
| 2 points | Armenia |
| 1 point | Sweden |

Points awarded by Lithuania
| Score | Country |
|---|---|
| 12 points | Georgia |
| 10 points | Russia |
| 8 points | Belarus |
| 7 points | Latvia |
| 6 points | Netherlands |
| 5 points | Sweden |
| 4 points | Macedonia |
| 3 points | Belgium |
| 2 points | Moldova |
| 1 point | Ukraine |
