= Russia in the Junior Eurovision Song Contest 2011 =

- Junior Eurovision Song Contest 2011
- Country: Russia
- Selection process: National Final
- Selection date: 29 May 2011

Competing entry
- Song: "Romeo and Juliet"
- Artist: Ekaterina Ryabova

Placement
- Final result: 4th, 99 points

Participation chronology

Russia selected their Junior Eurovision entry for 2011 through national final, consisting of 20 songs. The winner was Ekaterina Ryabova with song "Kak Romeo i Dzhulyetta". Ekaterina represented Russia at the seventh edition of the contest and won second place.

== Before Junior Eurovision ==
=== National final ===
The final which took place on 29 May 2011 at the "Akademichesky" concert hall in Moscow. The winner was determined by a 50/50 combination of jury voting and televoting.

Final – 29 May 2011
Draw	Artist	Song	Percentage	Place
1	Sabina Gizzatullina	"Klyaksa vaksa" (Клякса вакса)	9.00%	2
2	Treki	"Mechta" (Мечта)	6.33%	6
3	Anton Savkin	"V ritme tantsa" (В ритме танца)	5.74%	8
4	Arina Doronina	"My dostanemsya k zvezdam" (Мы достанемся к звездам)	2.92%	16
5	Ekaterina Ryabova	"Kak Romeo i Dzhulyetta" (Как Ромео и Джулетта)	10.32%	1
6	Anastasia Gned	"Solntse na resnitsah" (Солнце на ресницах)	8.75%	3
7	Vladlena Bogdanova	"Solnechny luch" (Солнечный луч)	7.52%	4
8	Alexei Vasiliev	"Botanik" (Ботаник)	2.12%	18
9	Darya Lukash	"Alisa v stranie chudets" (Алиса в стране чудес)	5.34%	9
10	Akademia Volshebnikov	"Kogda niet slov" (Когда нет слов)	3.04%	15
11	Anna Agafonova	"Ya – devochka leto" (Я – девочка лето)	1.08%	20
12	Syuzanna Mkhitaryan	"Angel" (Ангел)	4.79%	10
13	Adelya Farukshina	"Ya idu za solntsem" (Я иду за солнцем)	1.38%	19
14	Artyom Kuznetsov	"Mega zvyozdy" (Мега звёзды)	2.21%	17
15	Nikola Dimitriyev	"Lyod" (Лёд)	4.12%	12
16	Ellina Dunayevskaya	"Starye igrushki" (Старые игрушки)	6.05%	7
17	Anastasiya Gladkikh	"Solntse na resnitsakh" (Солнце на ресницах)	4.58%	11
18	Arkadiy Kozuv & Kanat Bizhanov	"Zriteli" (Зрители)	3.87%	13
19	Varvara Strizhak	"Labirint" (Лабиринт)	3.59%	14
20	Gleb Gershman & Yuliya Donguzova	"Davayte poshalim" (Давайте пошалим)	7.25%	5

== At Junior Eurovision ==
=== Voting ===
Points awarded to Russia
Score	Country
12 points (Note: All countries received one set of 12 points to ensure no country finished with nul points.)	Bulgaria; Sweden
10 points	Armenia; Belgium; Latvia; Lithuania
8 points	Ukraine
7 points	Belarus; Netherlands
6 points	
5 points	
4 points	
3 points	
2 points	
1 point	Georgia

Points awarded by Russia
Score	Country
12 points	Belarus
10 points	Georgia
8 points	Armenia
7 points	Netherlands
6 points	Moldova
5 points	Ukraine
4 points	Sweden
3 points	Belgium
2 points	Bulgaria
1 point	Macedonia
