= Traets =

Traets is a Dutch surname. Notable people with the surname include:

- Laura Traets (born 1998), Bulgarian rhythmic gymnast
- Rachel Traets (born 1998), Dutch singer
