= Candy bar (disambiguation) =

Candy bar refers to a variety of confectioneries that are shaped in a bar form

Candy bar may also refer to:

- Chocolate bar, a confection in bar form that contains chocolate
- CandyBar, a Mac OS X icon application
- Candy Barr, a mid-20th century striptease artist
- Dylan's Candy Bar, a candy store in New York City
- Candybar phone, a form factor (shape and layout) of a mobile phone
- Candy Bar (London), a lesbian bar in Soho that shut in 2014
- "CandyBar", a song by Cara Jones from Now
- "Candi Bar", a song by Keith Murray from He's Keith Murray

== See also ==
- Candy (disambiguation)
- Bar (disambiguation)
