= Kandy (disambiguation) =

Kandy is a city in the centre of Sri Lanka.

It may also refer to:

== Places ==
- Kingdom of Kandy, an independent monarchy on Sri Lanka between the 15th and 19th centuries
- Kandy District, a district of Sri Lanka
  - Kandy Electoral District
  - Kandy Electoral District (1947–1989)
  - Kandy Lake
- Roman Catholic Diocese of Kandy

== People ==
- Kandy Cordova (1936–2023), American politician
- Kandy Fong, fan video creator credited with creating the concept of mash-ups
- Kandy Ho, Puerto Rican drag queen
- Kandy Muse, Afro-Dominican American drag queen
- Kandy Nehova (born 1946), Namibian politician
- Kandy Tamer (fl. 1994–2000), Australian-born former rugby league player in Lebanon
- Kandy Wong (born 1987), Hong Kong singer and actor

== Other uses ==
- Kandy.io, a communications platform as a service (PaaS) created by GENBAND in 2014
- Kandy (horse) (foaled 1929–after 1943), French Thoroughbred racehorse and broodmare
- Candy (unit) or kandy, an Indian unit of mass

== See also ==
- Candi (disambiguation)
- Candy (disambiguation)
- Kandi (disambiguation)
- Kandys, a Persian garment
