= Cande =

Cande may refer to:

- Candé, a commune in western France
- Čande, a village in Bosnia and Herzegovina
- CANDE, a command-line shell
- Candé, a surname:
  - Baciro Candé, Guinea-Bissauan footballer
  - Braima Candé, Portuguese footballer
  - Mamadu Candé, Guinea-Bissauan footballer
- Candel Astra, also known as cande, an Uruguayan brand of candy

== See also ==
- Candé-sur-Beuvron, a commune in the Loir-et-Cher, central France
- Candes-Saint-Martin, a commune in the Indre-et-Loire, central France
- Château de Candé, a castle in the Indre-et-Loire
- Emmanuel Candès (born 1970), mathematician
- Kande (disambiguation)
- Candy (disambiguation)
- Candi (disambiguation)
