= Oreste Candi =

Italian luthier (1865 - 1938)

Oreste Candi (27 November 1865 – 4 September 1938) was an Italian luthier.

Candi was born in Minerbio near Bologna. He was the older brother of Cesare Candi, and was the first of the two brothers to apprentice under Raffaele Fiorini (in Bologna). He later moved to work in Genoa.

In 1886, he was already an employee of the Barberis brothers. Then, in the last decade of the 19th century, he dedicated himself to the construction of mandolins and guitars with his younger brother Cesare in their own violin making workshop in via dei Servi 54.

From the 1900s to 1930, Oreste had a workshop at Vico di Ponticello. He began making stringed instruments at a relatively late age; the construction of violins before 1915 was sporadic.

'The most interesting of his works were inspired by the Genova school of the 18th Century which he probably knew from originals and also copies left from Erminio Montefiori.'

It is worthwhile to note Oreste Candi's sole pupil, Lorenzo Bellafontana, whose production of bowed instruments includes both violins and guitars, showcasing a variety of styles. In the 1950s, he produced several ‘Cannon’ violins in the style of Prague, some featuring original labels. This indicates that the tradition of violin making in Genoa remained strong. A significant connection between the past and present is Paganini's ‘Cannon,’ which has been housed in the city's town hall for approximately 150 years. This violin serves as a foundational reference for many makers, including Cesare Candi, who maintained a respectful distance from it.

In 1936, two years before he died at Genova, Candi made his one and only double bass. The label reads "#122, Oreste Candi, fece in Genvoa, l'anno 1936. This is the one and only Candi Bass; http://www.kensmithbasses.com/doublebasses/Candi/Candi.html

== Biography ==
- Blot, Eric (1994). "Liguria III", Un secolo di liuteria italiana, 1860-1960 - A century of Italian violin making. Cremona: Turris. ISBN 88-7929-125-4.
- La Liuteria Italiana / Italian Violin Making in the 1800s and 1900s - Umberto Azzolina
- I Maestri Del Novicento - Carlo Vettori
- La Liuteria Lombarda del '900 - Roberto Codazzi, Cinzia Manfredini 2002
- Dictionary of 20th Century Italian Violin Makers - Marlin Brinser 1978
- Vannes, Rene [1951] (1985). Dictionnaire Universel del Luthiers (vol.3). Bruxelles: Les Amis de la musique. OCLC 53749830.
- William, Henley (1969). Universal Dictionary of Violin & Bow Makers. Brighton; England: Amati. ISBN 0-901424-00-5.
