= Georgia in the Junior Eurovision Song Contest 2011 =

- Junior Eurovision Song Contest 2011
- Country: Georgia
- Selection process: National final
- Selection date: 9 July 2011

Competing entry
- Song: "Candy Music"
- Artist: Candy

Placement
- Final result: 1st, 108 points

Participation chronology

Georgia was represented at the Junior Eurovision Song Contest 2011 which took place on 3 December 2011, in Yerevan, Armenia. Georgian Public Broadcaster (GPB) was responsible for organising their entry for the contest. Teen-pop group Candy was selected to represent Georgia with the song "Candy Music". Georgia won the contest with 108 points.

== Background ==
Prior to the 2011 Contest, Georgia had participated in the Junior Eurovision Song Contest four times since its debut in 2007. They have never missed an edition of the contest, and have won at the 2008 contest.

== Before Junior Eurovision ==
=== National final ===
Georgia selected their Junior Eurovision entry for 2011 through a national selection consisting of 9 songs, hosted by Sophio Toroshelidze. The winner was girl-group Candy, with a song "Candy Music". Candy won the jury vote and came second in the televote, with first place from the televote going to 3T. The jury consisted of: Gia Janturia, Giorgi Gachechiladze, Mamuka Megrelishvili, Maya Baratashvili, Nika Tskhertsvadze and Irina Sanikidze. The final was originally scheduled to take place on 1 June, but after the deadline for song submission was changed to 9 June, the final was pushed back to 9 July. After the release of the competing entries, some were accused of plagiarism.

Final – 9 July 2011
Draw	Artist	Song	Televote				Place
Draw	Artist	Song	SMS	Phone	Total	Rank	Place
1	Candy	"Candy Music"	228	1,237	1,465	2	1
2	Shotiko Shermadini	"Gzavnili"	52	479	531	6	—
3	Ekaterine Goglidze	"Chveni samqaro"	11	174	185	9	—
4	Kate Samkharadze	"Aghali dghe"	142	517	659	5	—
5	Kato da Lika	"Happy Day Today"	118	726	844	4	—
6	Nino Kakhadze	"Metsamuli vardi"	214	775	989	3	—
7	Nino Japharidze	"Ahqevi khmas"	89	284	373	7	—
8	Mary Tsilosani	"Chemi gza"	29	326	355	8	—
9	3T	"Daijere"	236	1,540	1,776	1	2

== Artist and song information ==
=== Candy ===
Candy
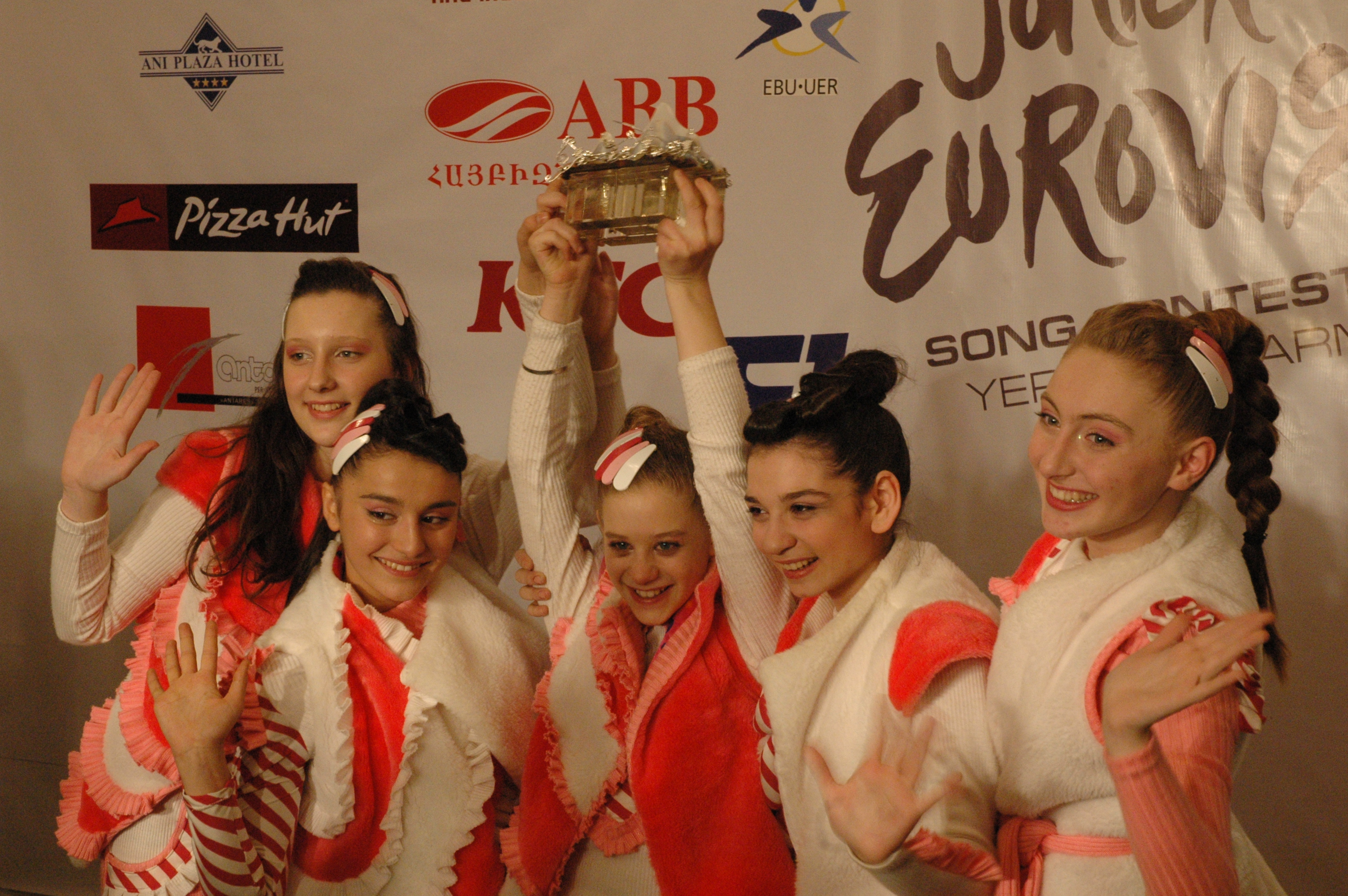
- Candy after winning Junior Eurovision 2011

Background information
- Origin: Tbilisi, Georgia
- Genres: Electropop, dance-pop, disco house
- Years active: 2011–2012; 2022; 2025
- Members: Irina Kovalenko; Ana Khanchalyan; Irina Khechanovi; Mariam Gvaladze; Gvantsa Saneblidze; Tako Gagnidze (2022); Sandra Gadelia (2025)

The winning contestants, Candy, were an all-girl teen-pop group from Tbilisi, consisting of Irina Kovalenko, Ana Khanchalyan, Irina Khechanovi, Mariam Gvaladze and Gvantsa Saneblidze, managed by Georgian composer Giga Kukhiadnidze and Bzikebi Studio.

The group went separate ways in 2012, a year after their win.

In 2022, they reunited to perform at the Junior Eurovision Song Contest 2022, for the 20th anniversary, winners show. (Featuring new member Tako Gagnidze)

Later, in 2023 Irina Khechanovi went on to represent Georgia in the Eurovision Song Contest 2023 with the song "Echo".

The group reunited reunited once again, to perform their new song "Code" during an interval act at the Junior Eurovision Song Contest 2025 held in their home country.

Awards and achievements
Preceded by Vladimir Arzumanyan	Winner of the Junior Eurovision Song Contest; 2011	Succeeded by Anastasiya Petryk
Preceded by Mariam Kakhelishvili	Georgia in the Junior Eurovision Song Contest; 2011	Succeeded by Funkids

=== Candy Music ===
"Candy Music" was a song recorded by Georgian teen girl group Candy, which won the Junior Eurovision Song Contest 2011 for Georgia, scoring 108 points.

== At Junior Eurovision ==
During the running order draw which took place on 11 October 2011, Georgia was drawn to perform twelfth on 3 December 2011, following Sweden and preceding Belgium.

=== Final ===
During the final, Candy performed in a V formation with Irina Khechanovi at the front. They wore bright pink outfits, resembling candy. Candy won the Junior Eurovision Song Contest 2011, receiving 108 points for their song "Candy Music". This is the fewest points a winning song has ever received.

=== Voting ===
Points awarded to Georgia
Score	Country
12 points (Note: All countries received one set of 12 points to ensure no country finished with nul points.)	Armenia; Belarus; Lithuania
10 points	Netherlands; Russia
8 points	Moldova
7 points	
6 points	Belgium; Bulgaria; Sweden; Ukraine
5 points	Macedonia
4 points	
3 points	Latvia
2 points	
1 point	

Points awarded by Georgia
Score	Country
12 points	Lithuania
10 points	Armenia
8 points	Belarus
7 points	Ukraine
6 points	Bulgaria
5 points	Belgium
4 points	Moldova
3 points	Macedonia
2 points	Netherlands
1 point	Russia
