= Junior Eurovision Song Contest 2011 =

International song competition for youth

- Reach for the Top!

Date and venue
- Final: 3 December 2011
- Venue: Karen Demirchyan Sports and Concerts Complex; Yerevan, Armenia

Organisation
- Organiser: European Broadcasting Union (EBU)
- Executive supervisor: Sietse Bakker

Production
- Host broadcaster: Public Television Company of Armenia (ARMTV)
- Director: Daniel Jelinek
- Executive producer: Levon Simonyan
- Presenters: Gohar Gasparyan; Avet Barseghyan

Participants
- Number of entries: 13
- Returning countries: Bulgaria
- Non-returning countries: Malta; Serbia
- Participation map: Competing countries Countries that participated in the past but not in 2011

Vote
- Voting system: Each country awards 1–8, 10, and 12 points to their 10 favourite songs.
- Winning song: Georgia "Candy Music"

The Junior Eurovision Song Contest 2011 was the ninth edition of the Junior Eurovision Song Contest, held on 3 December 2011 at the Karen Demirchyan Sports and Concerts Complex in Yerevan, Armenia, and presented by Gohar Gasparyan and Avet Barseghyan. It was organised by the European Broadcasting Union (EBU) and host broadcaster the Public Television Company of Armenia (ARMTV). It was the first time in the history of the Junior Eurovision Song Contest that the contest was hosted the previous year's winning broadcaster, and the first time the Contest was held in Asia, or outside Europe. Swedish company HD Resources assisted with the technical side of the production.

Broadcasters from thirteen countries participated in the contest, with Malta and Serbia withdrawing and Bulgaria returning.

The winner was Georgia with the song "Candy Music" by the group Candy. Netherlands and Belarus finished in second and third place, respectively. This was Georgia's second victory in the contest following a previous victory in 2008.

== Location ==
Locations of the known bidding countries. The eliminated countries are marked in red. The chosen host country is marked in blue.

During the preparations to the 2010 contest, speculation about the future of the contest began to circulate on internet forums. On 18 October, during a meeting held in Minsk, Belarus, the head of the Armenian delegation, Diana Mnatsakanyan, announced that the upcoming eighth edition of the contest could be the last. However, these rumours were formally denied on 19 November when the then-executive supervisor of the contest, Svante Stockselius, announced that the next edition was scheduled for 2011 and that "We expect this contest to go on for many more years, this is not the last contest". Later, it was reported that the EBU were holding discussions with four potential host broadcasters, although further details were not confirmed and would "cautiously consider" looking for a host broadcaster for the 2012 contest at the same time.

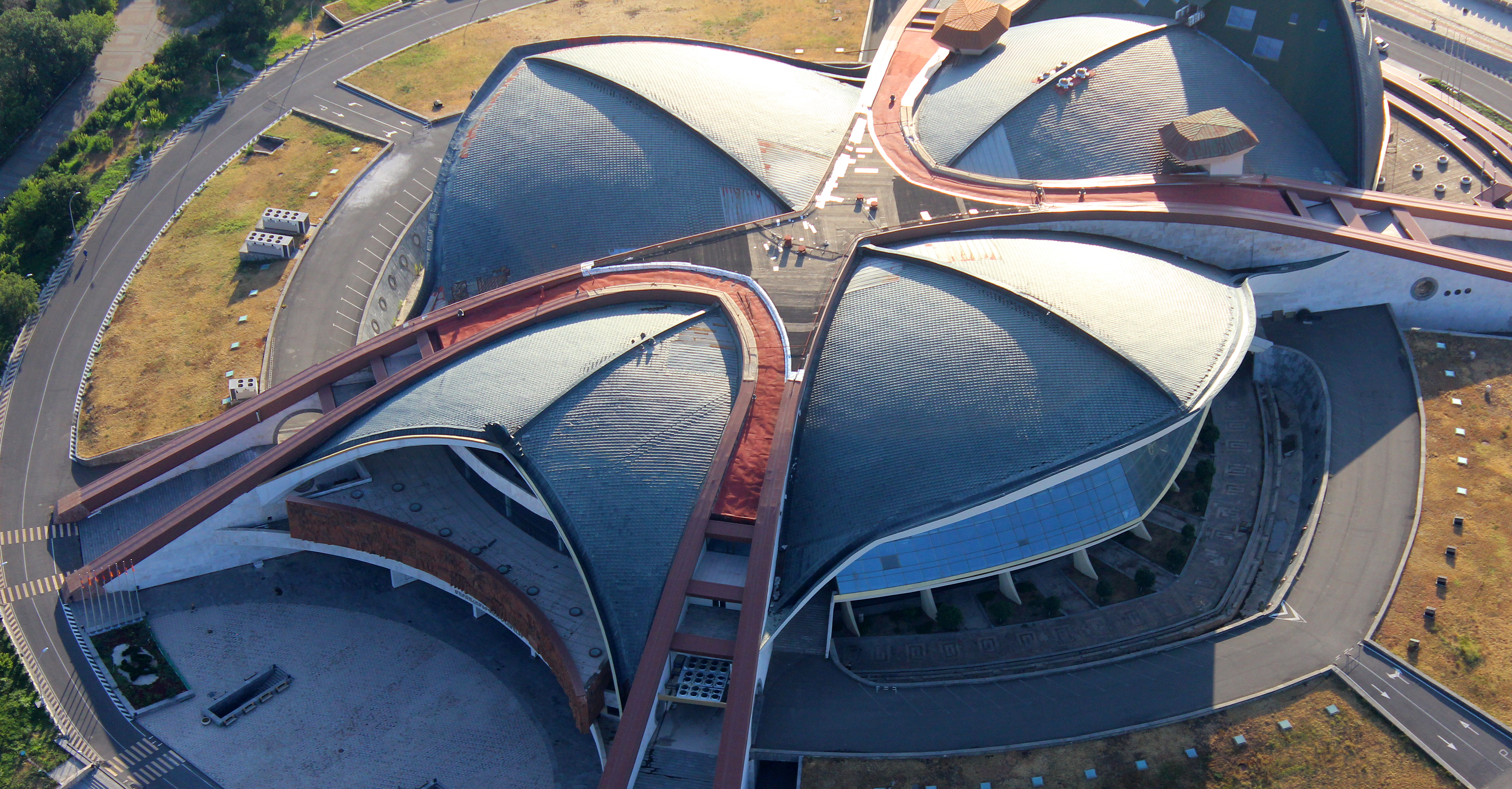
Karen Demirchyan Sports and Concerts Complex in Yerevan, was the host venue for the contest.

Originally, unlike in the adult contest, the winning country did not receive the automatic rights to host the next contest but were instead awarded following a bidding process with broadcasters from the participating countries. However, rumours suggested that given the lack of interest from other countries, the EBU could invite Armenia as the current winner to host the event. On 18 January 2011, Armenian national broadcaster ARMTV and the European Broadcasting Union (EBU) announced that the 2011 contest would take place in the recently renovated main arena of the Karen Demirchyan Sports and Concerts Complex, in Yerevan.

Together with AMPTV, we are eager to put together the coolest Junior Eurovision Song Contest that Europe has seen so far. The event is extremely popular in Armenia and their strong bid gave us the confidence they will be capable to put together a great show.

— Sietse Bakker, Executive Supervisor of the Junior Eurovision Song Contest

Denying rumours that Armenia was the only one interested in hosting, the chairman of the board of ARMTV, Aleksan Harutyunyan, revealed that Armenia was chosen among two shortlisted candidate countries out of the five which submitted bids. Swedish broadcaster Sveriges Television (SVT) had reportedly submitted a formal offer to host, proposing to hold the contest at the Globen Arena in Stockholm. The local television host and the leader of the project Gohar Gasparyan emphasized that "Although Armenia won Junior Eurovision 2010, Armenia’s victory in the selection was due only to our application and submitted proposals."

== Participants ==
Cover art of the official album

On 15 July, the EBU announced that 12 countries would compete in the upcoming contest. San Marino was to compete for the first time, with Latvia, Serbia and Malta withdrawing. EBU also had been negotiating with Italy but RAI was not able to confirm their participation due to time constraints.

On 15 August, Bulgaria joined the list, returning after a two-year absence from the contest. On 9 September, Latvia reversed its decision to withdraw from the contest and confirmed its participation. On 7 October, San Marino announced that they would not be present in Yerevan as they were not able to find a suitable participant in time for the contest, hoping to send an entry to the 2012 edition. Therefore, a total of 13 countries took part in Armenia.

Prior to the event, a digital compilation album featuring all the songs from the 2011 contest, along with karaoke versions, was put together by the European Broadcasting Union and released by Universal Music Group on 25 November 2011.

Participants of the Junior Eurovision Song Contest 2011
Country	Broadcaster	Artist	Song	Language	Songwriter(s)
Armenia	AMPTV	Dalita	"Welcome to Armenia"	Armenian, English	Dalita Avanesian
Belarus	BTRC	Lidiya Zablotskaya	"Angely dobra" (Ангелы добра)	Russian	Lidiya Zablotskaya
Belgium	VRT	Femke	"Een kusje meer"	Dutch	Peter Gillis; Vincent Goeminne; Femke Verschueren
Bulgaria	BNT	Ivan Ivanov	"Superhero"	Bulgarian	Ivan Ivanov
Georgia	GPB	Candy	"Candy Music"	Georgian (Note: Contains a repeated phrase in English)	Mariam Gvaladze; Ana Khanchalyan; Irina Khechanovi; Irina Kovalenko; George "Giga" Kukhiadnidze; Gvantsa Saneblidze
Latvia	LTV	Amanda Bašmakova	"Moondog"	Latvian	Amanda Bašmakova; Janis Lusens; Guntars Racs
Lithuania	LRT	Paulina Skrabytė	"Debesys"	Lithuanian	Mindaugas Lapinskis; Paulina Skrabytė
Macedonia	MRT	Dorijan Dlaka	"Žimi ovoj frak" (Жими овој фрак)	Macedonian	Dorijan Dlaka
Moldova	TRM	Lerika	"No, No"	Romanian, English	Eugen Doibani
Netherlands	AVRO	Rachel	"Teenager"	Dutch (Note: Contains some phrases in English)	Willem Laseroms; Maarten ten Hove; Rachel Traets; Joachim Vermeulen Windsant
Russia	VGTRK	Katya Ryabova	"Romeo and Juliet"	Russian	Ekaterina Ryabova
Sweden	SVT	Erik Rapp	"Faller"	Swedish	Mikael Gunneras; Johan Jamtberg; Erik Rapp
Ukraine	NTU	Kristall	"Yevropa" (Європа)	Ukrainian, English	Kristina Kochegarova

=== Returning artists ===
Even though the rules of Junior Eurovision at the time did not allow participation of returning artists, the EBU issued special permission for Ekaterina Ryabova, Russian participant in 2009, to compete again in 2011. According to Sietse Bakker, the contest's then-executive supervisor, the EBU would drop the rule from 2012 onward. Notably, Ryabova had also attempted to compete again the previous year, in 2010, but was disqualified following the then-existing rule.

== Format ==
=== Presenters ===
On 15 November 2011, it was revealed that Gohar Gasparyan and Avet Barseghyan would be the hosts of the show.

=== Logo and graphic design ===
In May 2011, ARMTV announced a competition for children to design the official logo of the contest, which was due to be presented on 1 June. However, in the end the logo was designed by professional teams from ARMTV, the EBU and Anton Baranov Studio from Belarus, who had also designed the logo of the previous year's contest. The logo was presented on 15 July 2011. It depicts equalizer bars in the shape of a mountain, hinting at a toy version of the famous Mount Ararat.

The graphics were made by Guðmundur Þór Kárason, from Iceland, who had previously worked on the Icelandic children's show LazyTown and was a photographer for the Eurovision Song Contest 2010. The postcards were produced and directed by him alongside Arthur Vardanyan.

The logo is vibrant, young and playful. The slogan "Reach For The Top" really reflects the ambition of the contestants, and hopefully inspires a young generation of Armenians to do the same.

— Sietse Bakker, Executive Supervisor of the Junior Eurovision Song Contest

=== Voting rule changes ===
Changes to the voting rules included allowing televoting after all songs had been performed, and not from the beginning of the show as in previous years – returning to the rules active in 2003–2005. Each country's spokesperson also announced all the points from 1 to 12 during their presentation, due to the lower number of participating countries, as done in 2003–2004.

== Contest overview ==
The event took place on 3 December 2011 at 21:30 AMT (19:30 CET). Thirteen countries participated, with the running order published on 11 October 2011. All the countries competing were eligible to vote with the jury and televote. Georgia won with 108 points, with the Netherlands and Belarus completing the top three. Ukraine, Macedonia and Latvia occupied the bottom three positions.

The show was opened with a traditional dance performance. The interval included Molly Sanden performing "Spread a Little Light", whilst Sirusho performed a remixed version of "Qélé, Qélé". The previous year's winner, Vladimir Arzumanyan, also took to the stage.

R/O	Country	Artist	Song	Points	Place (Note: Two songs tied for third-highest score with 99 points, and two other tied for lowest score with 31 points, but the official scoreboard ranks Belarus as third, Russia as fourth, Macedonia as twelfth and Latvia as thirteenth placer. This is consistent with the tie-breaking rule that the song that received points from the most countries ranks higher in the case of a tie.)
1	Russia	Katya Ryabova	"Romeo and Juliet"	99	4
2	Latvia	Amanda Bašmakova	"Moondog"	31	13
3	Moldova	Lerika	"No, No"	78	6
4	Armenia	Dalita	"Welcome to Armenia"	85	5
5	Bulgaria	Ivan Ivanov	"Superhero"	60	8
6	Lithuania	Paulina Skrabytė	"Debesys"	53	10
7	Ukraine	Kristall	"Yevropa"	42	11
8	Macedonia	Dorijan Dlaka	"Žimi ovoj frak"	31	12
9	Netherlands	Rachel	"Teenager"	103	2
10	Belarus	Lidiya Zablotskaya	"Angely dobra"	99	3
11	Sweden	Erik Rapp	"Faller"	57	9
12	Georgia	Candy	"Candy Music"	108	1
13	Belgium	Femke	"Een kusje meer"	64	7

=== Spokespersons ===
The order in which votes were cast during the 2011 contest along with the spokesperson who was responsible for announcing the votes for their respective country.

1. Russia – Valentin Sadiki
2. Latvia – Šarlote Lēnmane
3. Moldova – Ștefan Roșcovan
4. Armenia – Razmik Arghajanyan
5. Bulgaria – Samuil Sarandev-Sancho
6. Lithuania – Dominykas Žvirblis
7. Ukraine – Amanda Koenig
8. Macedonia – Anja Veterova
9. Netherlands – Anna Lagerweij
10. Belarus – Anna Kovalyova
11. Sweden – Ina-Jane von Herff
12. Georgia – Elene Makashvili
13. Belgium – Jill & Lauren

== Detailed voting results ==
Detailed voting results
		Total score	Russia	Latvia	Moldova	Armenia	Bulgaria	Lithuania	Ukraine	Macedonia	Netherlands	Belarus	Sweden	Georgia	Belgium
Contestants	Russia	99		10		10	12	10	8		7	7	12	1	10
Contestants	Latvia	31			2			7	1	8					1
Contestants	Moldova	78	6	4		6	10	2	7	6	4	8	4	4	5
Contestants	Armenia	85	8	1	7		5		10	7	5	5	8	10	7
Contestants	Bulgaria	60	2	2	4	1			3	12	3	6	5	6	4
Contestants	Lithuania	53		6	6	2				10		4	1	12	
Contestants	Ukraine	42	5		1	5	1	1		1	2	2	2	7	3
Contestants	Macedonia	31	1		5		2	4			1	3		3	
Contestants	Netherlands	103	7	12	10	7	8	6	5	2		10	10	2	12
Contestants	Belarus	99	12	7	12	8	4	8	12	3	8		3	8	2
Contestants	Sweden	57	4	8	3	4	3	5	4		6				8
Contestants	Georgia	108	10	3	8	12	6	12	6	5	10	12	6		6
Contestants	Belgium	64	3	5		3	7	3	2	4	12	1	7	5	

=== 12 points ===
Below is a summary of all 12 points received. All countries were given 12 points at the start of voting to ensure that no country finished with nul points; these 12 points were announced by a spokesperson from Australia.

N.	Contestant	Nation(s) giving 12 points
3	Georgia	Armenia, Belarus, Lithuania
3	Belarus	Moldova, Russia, Ukraine
2	Russia	Bulgaria, Sweden
2	Netherlands	Belgium, Latvia
1	Bulgaria	Macedonia
1	Belgium	Netherlands
1	Lithuania	Georgia

== Broadcasts ==
Each national broadcaster sent a commentator to the contest, in order to provide coverage of the contest in their own native language. Details of the commentators and the broadcasting station for which they represented are also included in the table below.

Broadcasters and commentators in participating countries
Country	Broadcaster(s)	Channel(s)	Commentator(s)	Ref.
Armenia	ARMTV	Armenia 1	Artak Vardanyan and Marianna Javakhyan	
Belarus	BTRC	Belarus 1	Denis Kurian	
Belgium	VRT	Eén	Kristien Maes and Tom De Cock	
Bulgaria	BNT	BNT 1	Elena Rosberg and Georgi Kushvaliev	
Georgia	GPB	1TV	Temo Kvirkvelia	
Latvia	LTV	LTV7	Markus Riva	
Lithuania	LRT	LRT TV	Darius Užkuraitis	
Macedonia	MRT	MRT 1	Elizabeta Cebova	
Moldova	TRM	Moldova 1, TV Moldova Internațional	Rusalina Rusu	
Netherlands	AVRO	Nederland 3	Marcel Kuijer	
Russia	VGRTK	Russia-1	Olga Shelest	
Sweden	SVT	SVT B	Edward af Sillen and Ylva Hällen	
Ukraine	NTU	Pershyi	Timur Miroshnychenko	

Broadcasters and commentators in non-participating countries
Country	Broadcaster(s)	Channel(s)	Commentator(s)	Ref.
Australia	SBS	SBS One (26 December 2011 and 9 April 2012)	Unknown	
Bosnia and Herzegovina	BHRT	BHT1 (delayed)	Unknown	

== See also ==
- Eurovision Song Contest 2011
