= Lithuania in the Junior Eurovision Song Contest =

- Junior Eurovision Song Contest
- Participating broadcaster: Lietuvos nacionalinis radijas ir televizija (LRT)

Participation summary
- Appearances: 4
- First appearance: 2007
- Last appearance: 2011
- Highest placement: 3rd: 2008
- Participation history: 2007; 2008; 2009; 2010; 2011; 2012 – 2026
- For the most recent participation see Lithuania in the Junior Eurovision Song Contest 2011

Lithuania has been represented at the Junior Eurovision Song Contest four times, first entering at the 2007 contest. The Lithuanian participating broadcaster in the contest is Lietuvos nacionalinis radijas ir televizija (LRT). The broadcaster briefly returned in 2010 and 2011 however again withdrew from competing after the contest held in Yerevan, and have yet to make their return to the contest.

== History ==
The national selection process occurred during the show Mažųjų žvaigždžių ringas, in which young singers aged 10–15 would take part with self-written songs. The 2007 Lithuanian entry was Lina Jurevičiūtė, a.k.a. Lina Joy, with the song "Kai miestas snaudžia", who finished 13th in the contest. The 2008 entry was Eglė Jurgaitytė with "Laiminga diena", which ended third for Lithuania at the 2008 Contest in Limassol.

=== First withdrawal and return ===
After two years of participating, LRT withdrew from the contest in 2009 due to financial reasons but they returned in 2010. That year LRT sent Bartas with the song "Oki Doki". It placed 6th out of 14 participants.

They also participated in 2011 and sent Paulina Skrabytė with the song "Debesys", which placed 10th.

=== Second withdrawal ===
In 2012, the country withdrew again due to expenses and has not returned to the contest since. On 19 November 2015, it was announced that the Baltic countries, including Lithuania, had expressed interest in taking part in the 2016 contest. The return however did not materialise. On 28 February 2018, the Lithuanian broadcaster LRT declared that they would not return to contest in the near future. LRT executive TV producer and Head of Delegation for the adult contest Audrius Giržadas stated that "this contest has become a clone of the main Eurovision Song Contest and has nothing to do with childhood, little girls go on stage with clipped hairs, glued eyelashes and bare belly, copying Beyoncé and Christina Aguilera – this is not an event that we would like to participate in." Giržadas confirmed that broadcaster would not be returning to the contest in 2021, citing low ratings during their time in the contest and the cost of participation. However, in November 2023, LRT stated on that the country would not be returning to the contest in 2024, but would broadcast both the 2023 and 2024 editions and assess their ratings for a potential return in 2025. LRT ultimately opted against participation in the 2025 contest.

== Participation overview ==
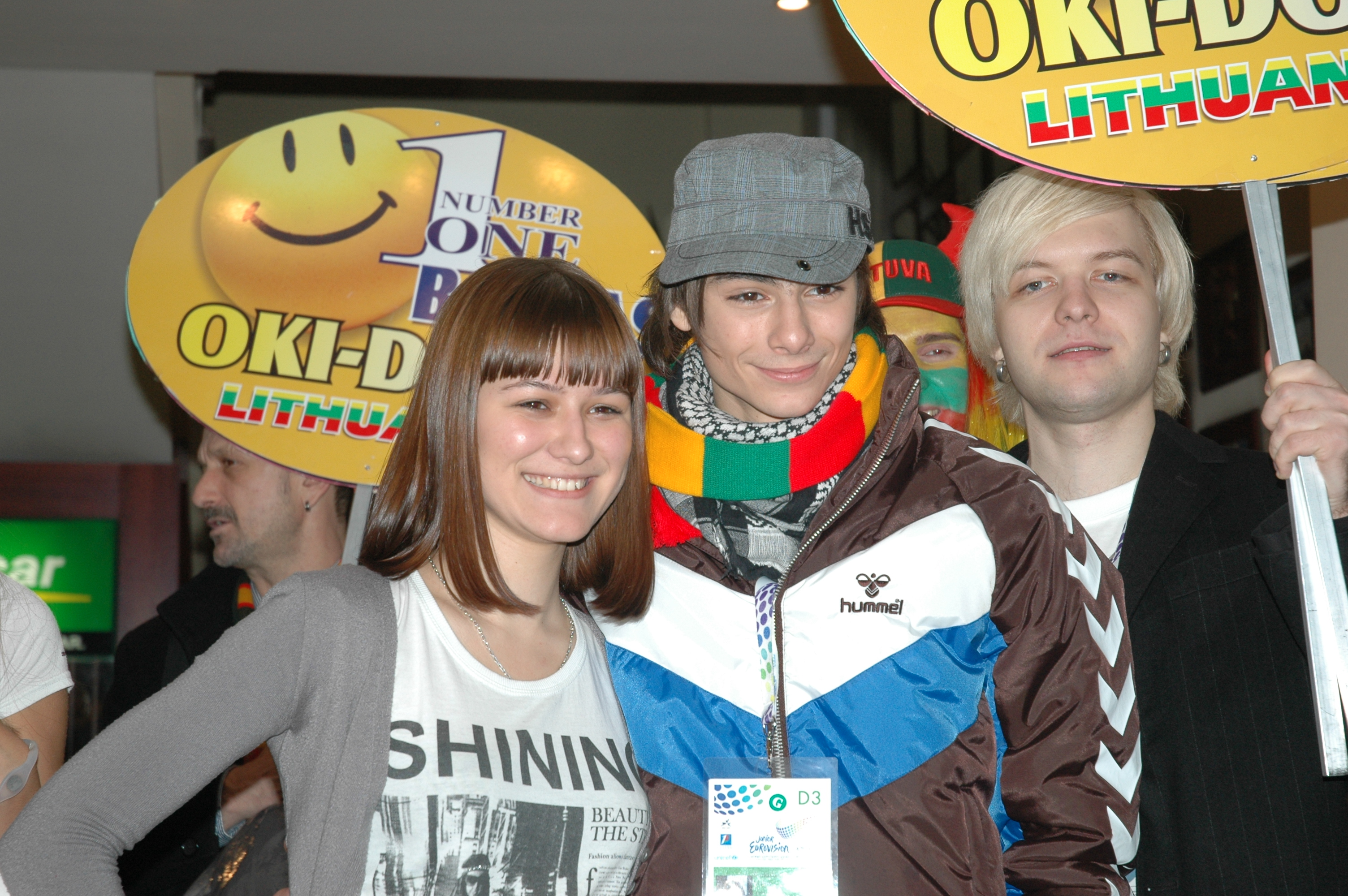
Bartas (center) in Minsk (2010)

Table key
3	Third place

Year	Artist	Song	Language	Place	Points
2007	Lina Joy	"Kai miestas snaudžia"	Lithuanian	13	33
2008	Eglė Jurgaitytė	"Laiminga diena"	Lithuanian	3	103
2010	Bartas	"Oki Doki"	Lithuanian	6	67
2011	Paulina Skrabytė	"Debesys"	Lithuanian	10	53

== Commentators and spokespersons ==
The contests are broadcast online worldwide through the official Junior Eurovision Song Contest website junioreurovision.tv and YouTube. In 2015, the online broadcasts featured commentary in English by junioreurovision.tv editor Luke Fisher and 2011 Bulgarian Junior Eurovision Song Contest entrant Ivan Ivanov. The Lithuanian broadcaster, LRT, sent their own commentators to the contest in order to provide commentary in the Lithuanian language. Spokespersons were also chosen by the national broadcaster in order to announce the awarding points from Lithuania.

For the first time since their last participation in 2011, LRT decided to broadcast Junior Eurovision Song Contest 2023 live on LRT televizija with the same commentator as the adult contest, Ramūnas Zilnys. Previously, in 2019 and 2020, the contest was broadcast live on TVP Wilno to cater for the Polish speaking audience in the Švenčionys, Šalčininkai and Vilnius regions of the country.

The table below list the details of each commentator and spokesperson since 2007.

Year	Channel	Commentator	Spokesperson	Ref.
2007	LTV	Darius Užkuraitis	Indrė Grikšelytė	
2008	LTV	Darius Užkuraitis	Lina Joy	
2009	No broadcast		Did not participate	N/A
2010	LTV	Darius Užkuraitis	Bernardas Garbačiauskas	
2011	LTV	Darius Užkuraitis	Dominykas Žvirblis	
2012–2022	No broadcast (Note: In 2019 and 2020, the contest was broadcast live on TVP Wilno to cater for the Polish speaking audience in the Švenčionys, Šalčininkai and Vilnius regions of the country.)		Did not participate	N/A
2023	LRT televizija	Ramūnas Zilnys	Did not participate	
2024	LRT Plius	Ramūnas Zilnys	Did not participate	
2025–2026	No broadcast		Did not participate	N/A

== See also ==
- Lithuania in the Eurovision Song Contest – Senior version of the Junior Eurovision Song Contest.
