= Candies =

Candies or Candie's may refer to:

- Candy, a confection that features sugar as a principal ingredient
- Candies (group), a Japanese idol group
- Candies (TV series), a Philippine television program
- Candie's, a clothing brand
- Candies Creek Ridge, a geological feature in Bradley County, Tennessee
- Candie's Foundation, a non-profit organization to prevent teen pregnancy

== See also ==
- Candy (disambiguation)
- List of candies
