= Kandeh =

Kandeh كنده
- Village
- Location within Iran
- Coordinates: 38°43′39″N 47°15′57″E
- Country: Iran
- Province: East Azerbaijan
- County: Ahar
- Bakhsh: Hurand
- Rural District: Dikleh

Population (2006)
  - Total: 297
- Time zone: UTC+3:30 (IRST)
  - Summer (DST): UTC+4:30 (IRDT)

Kandeh (Persian: كنده, also Romanized as Kondeh; also known as Kianda and Kīyāndā) is a village in Dikleh Rural District, Hurand District, Ahar County, East Azerbaijan Province, Iran. At the 2006 census, its population was 297, in 61 families.
