= Candy Girl =

Candy Girl may refer to:

== Music ==
- Barbara Hetmańska or Candy Girl, Polish singer
- "Candy Girl" (The Four Seasons song)
- Candy Girl (album), an album by New Edition
  - "Candy Girl" (New Edition song)
- "Candy Girl" (Mika Nakashima song)
- "Candy Girl", a song by Babybird from Ugly Beautiful
- "Candy Girl", a mixtape by Lil' Brianna
- "Candy Girl", a song by hitomi
- "Candy Girl", a song by Low from Trust
- "Candy Girl", a song by Miki Furukawa
- "Candygirl", a song by Sweetbox from Sweetbox

== Other uses ==
- Candy Girl: A Year in the Life of an Unlikely Stripper, a memoir by Diablo Cody
- Candy Girls, a 2009 American reality TV series that aired on E!
