= Rachel Traets =

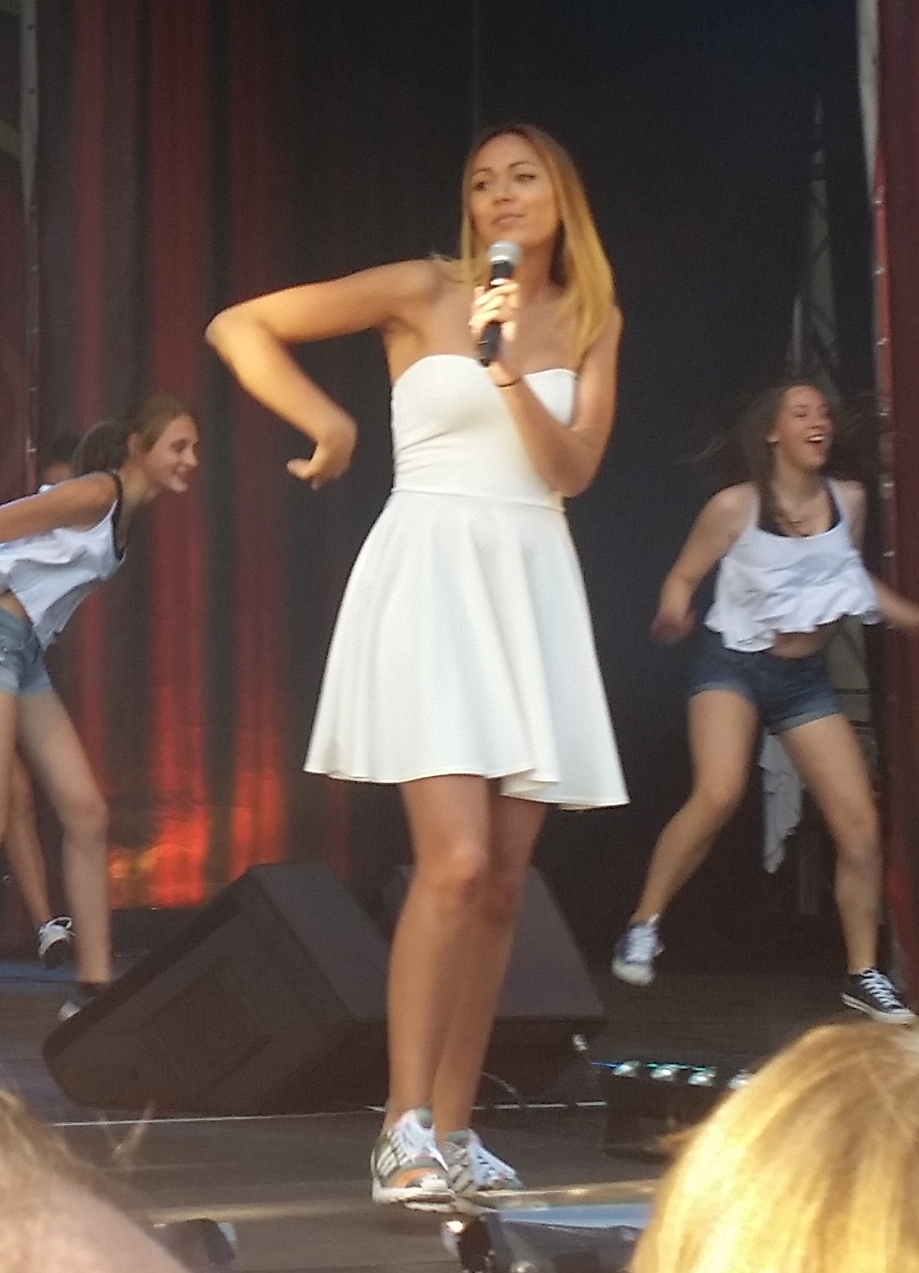
- Rachel Traets on stage

Background information
- Also known as: Rachel
- Born: Rachel Traets; 16 August 1998 (age 28); Wouw, Netherlands
- Genres: Pop rock, dance-pop, teen pop
- Occupation: Singer
- Years active: 2011-

Rachel Traets (born 16 August 1998) is a singer from the Netherlands. Traets lives in Wouw, a small village in the south-west of the Netherlands.

In October 2011 she won the Dutch music competition Junior Songfestival 2011 with the song "Ik Ben Een Teenager" (English: "I Am A Teenager"). She was selected to represent her country in the Junior Eurovision Song Contest 2011 held on 3 December 2011 in Yerevan, Armenia. A few weeks later the title "Ik Ben Een Teenager" was shrunk to "Teenager", which would be the official title for the Dutch entry. She came in second in the actual contest, five points behind the winner: Candy from Georgia. She received 12 points from Latvia and Belgium.

Rachel is preceded by Anna and Senna who represented the Netherlands in the Junior Eurovision Song Contest 2010 and succeeded by Femke who represented the Netherlands in 2012.

Currently, she is in a girlband, Hello August.

== Discography ==
=== Albums ===
- Teenager

=== Singles ===
- "Ik Ben een teenager"
- "Never Nooit"
- "Nanana"
- "Als Jij Maar Bij Me Bent"
- "Bad Ringtone"
- "Holding On"
- "Wrong Chick" (as part of Hello August)
- "Drunk Again" (as part of Hello August)

Awards and achievements
Preceded by Anna & Senna with My Family	Netherlands in the Junior Eurovision Song Contest; 2011	Succeeded by Femke with Tik Tak Tik
