= Dalita Avanesian =

Armenian singer

Dalita Avanesian Armenian: Դալիթա Ավանեսյան
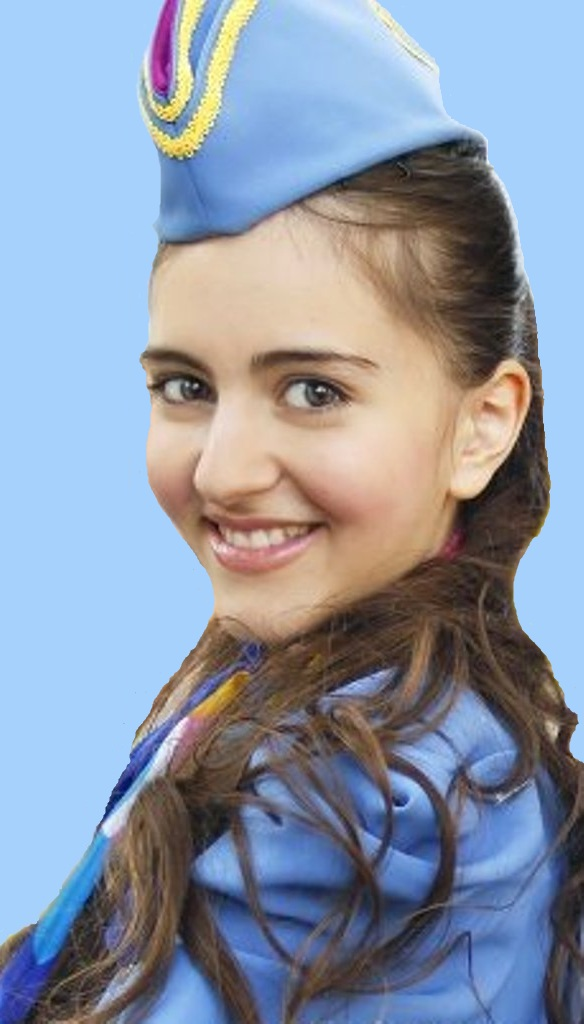

Background information
- Born: 19 September 1999 (age 27); Tehran, Iran
- Occupation: Singer
- Years active: 2007–present
- Website: dalita.am

Dalita Artin Avanesian (Armenian: Դալիթա Արթին Ավանեսյան; born 19 September 1999, Tehran, Iran) is an Armenian singer, participant of Junior Eurovision Song Contest 2011. She is now a lecturer in American University of Armenia, where she is the instructor of the course "Database Systems." She graduated from Management Department of "European College in Armenia". Simultaneously, she studies in the "Jazz-Vocal Department" of Yerevan Specialized Music School № 1 after Alexander Spendiaryan having already graduated from three departments of the latter; these being that of Classic Vocal, Piano and Guitar.

Her songs and video clips, have been included in various musical collections, in CD, DVD versions. In November 2015 she released her first album "Welcome to Armenia", which was the name of her song in Junior Eurovision Song Contest 2011. When talking about her greatest passion – music, she has been awarded numerous diplomas of honors and certificates of appreciation by different ministries, including the RA Ministry of Education and Science, the RA Ministry of Culture, the RA Ministry of Diaspora and the Honorary Chairperson of the Armenian Foundation "Grant Life", the First Lady of Armenia for her humanitarian and public activities, good will and active participation in charity work.

== Recognition ==
- In 2005 – Title "Miss Yerevan"
- In 2005 – Participation in Nationwide Beauty contest "Miss-Mister World" and the title of "Miss Armenia".
- in 2007– The title of "Miss Talent".
- In 2007 she became the laureate of "Alexander Spendiaryan Nationwide Contest-Festival of Young Musician-Performers".
- In 2008 – Honorable member of "Miss-Mister World" International Organization.
- In 2009 – The title "Miss Top Model Armenia 2009" and special award by Armenian famous boxer Alex Abraham.
- In 2009 and 2010 she won the first place in "Armenian Dance Olympiad" and received a gold medal.
- In 2009 she was awarded the first prize at Yerevan Municipality "Golden Flute" Contest-Festival.
- In 2010 and 2011 she became the laureate of "New Wave" Contest.
- In 2010 she participated in the Armenian pre-election phase of "Junior Eurovision Song Contest" and was included in top five singers.
- In 2011 – she was awarded a prize and Diploma of Honor for the "Best Hit" nomination of the first "Armenian National Children's Awards".
- In 2011 – she represented and hosted the first "Junior Eurovision" prestigious contest in Armenia.
- In 2011 – she was awarded the "Inspiration" prize for "Junior Eurovision 2011" at "Multiknik" Children Music Awards.
- In 2011 – she was granted the title and prize of "Eurovision Ambassador" at "Golden Screen Awards".
- In 2011 – she participated in "Armenian National Music Awards" as guest young performer.
- In 2012 – she was awarded the title and prize of "Miss Perfection" at "Miss Student" Contest-Festival.
- In 2012 – she was awarded the title and prize of "Stylish Teenage Singer" at "Style Screen" Awards.
- In 2013 – she participated in "Armenian Music Awards" held in Kremlin, Moscow, as guest young performer.
- In 2013 – The song "Mam Jan" was awarded the "Best Hit and Video Clip of the Year" at "Multiknik" National Children Music Awards.
- On 30 May 2014, the first solo concert of the teenage singer was held in Armenian Diaspora, in Lebanon.
- In 2014 – she participated in International Youth Festival of Russian Culture "Maltese Lyre" on Malta and was awarded "Golden microphone".
- In 2014– she was awarded the best main Actress of "In the Camp" movie for children and youth, at "Multiknik" Annual National Youth Music Awards.
- In 2014– she was awarded " the Best Young Singer of the year" qualification at "Armenia, Artsakh, Diaspora" Awards .
- In 2014 and 2015 – Diploma for the good will and active participation in charity works, at ArmAngel Awards.
- In 2014 – Diploma for singing the anthem of film-project Fairytale-Film and participating in the video-clip of the said anthem.
- In 2015 – Certificate for conducting the Second Republican Contest of Young Composers after Eduard Mirzoyan.
- In 2015 – Diploma for the nomination The Best Song (Crazy Generation) awarded within the framework of From Doh to Doh on Armenian TV Channel H3.
- in 2015 – Certificate for the nomination The Best Singer of the New Generation within the framework of Ararat Awards.
- In 2015 – Representing Armenia in "Verdinote" 33rd International Music Contest and winning the first prize "Golder Note".
- In 2015 November 16 – Launch of the first CD called "Welcome to Armenia".

== Filmography ==
As herself
| Year | Title | Notes |
|---|---|---|
| 2017 | 3/OFF | Contestant |

Awards and achievements
| Preceded by Vladimir Arzumanyan with "Mama" | Armenia in the Junior Eurovision Song Contest; 2011 | Succeeded by Compass Band with "Sweetie Baby" |
