= Candyman (singer) =

Cuban singer

Kandyman (born Ruben Cuesta Palomo) is a popular Cuban reggaeton (cubatón) singer.

== Career ==
Born in Santiago de Cuba, he grew up listening to Jamaican radio, and reggae music. He was one of the first artists to use the Jamaican dancehall and ragga musical styles in his compositions, thus creating the first unique cubatón sound in the early 2000s.

He is now considered as one of the leaders of the scene. He has a long standing collaboration with Sweden-based cubatón label Topaz Records, and has gained fame across the Americas and Europe in the genre.

Now in 2019 he has rebranded his name from Candyman to Kandyman and has new releases upcoming under Kobalt Music Group

== Discography ==
Songs

- "La Cosita"
- "Bayu Baye"
- "Ponte a la moda"
- "Cuando tú me besas"
- "Que se acabe"
