= Lerika =

Russian-Moldovan singer (born 1999)

Lerika Лерика
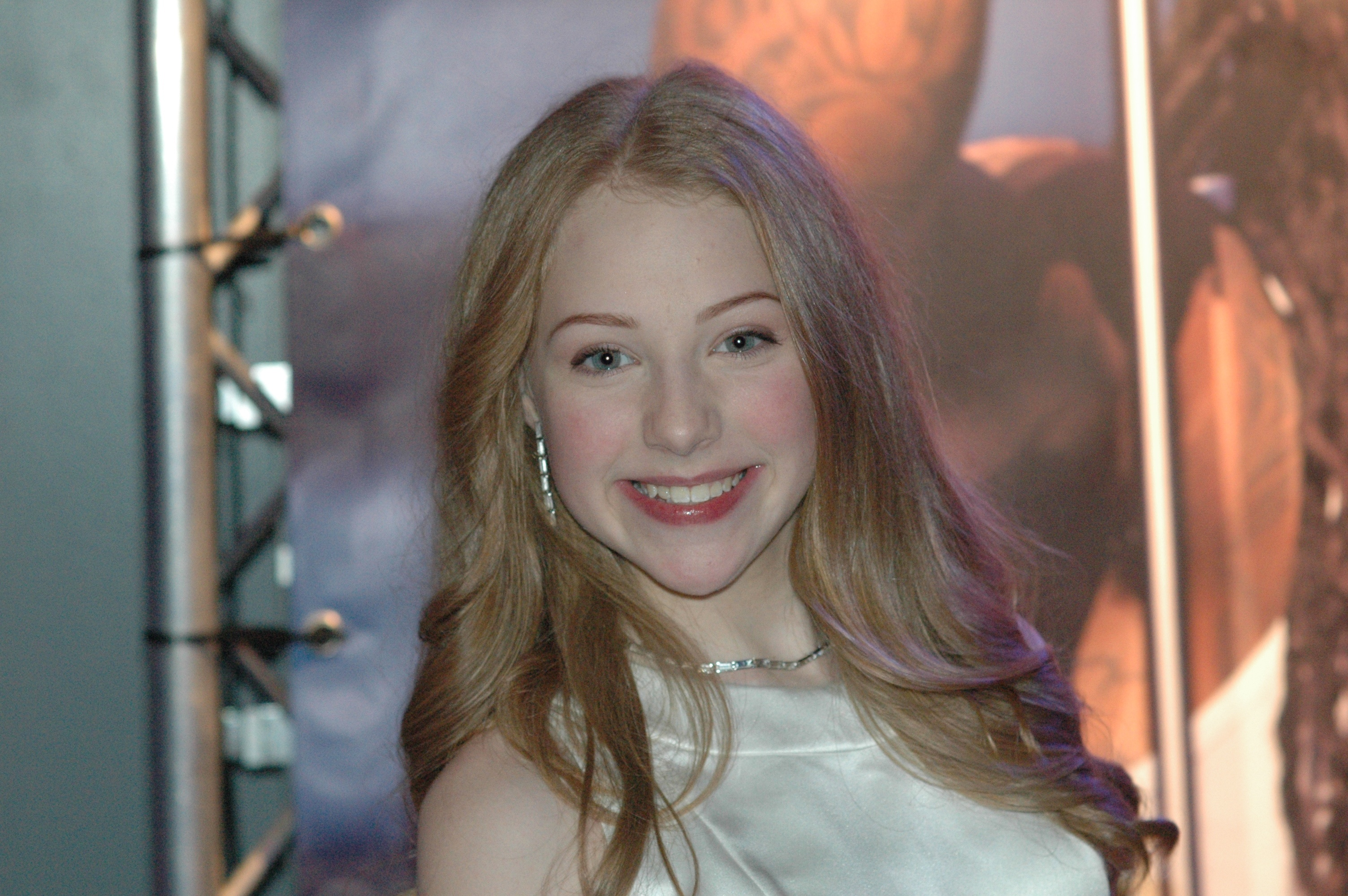
- Lerika in 2012

Background information
- Also known as: Lerika Engalycheva; Valeria Engalîceva
- Born: Valeriya Andreyevna Engalycheva; 7 April 1999 (age 27); Olomouc, Czech Republic
- Origin: Bălți, Moldova
- Genres: Pop
- Occupations: Singer; songwriter
- Instrument: Vocals
- Years active: 2004–present
- Website: lerika.ru

Valeriya Andreyevna Engalycheva (Russian: Валерия Андреевна Енгалычева; Romanian: Valeria Engalîceva; born 7 April 1999), known professionally as Lerika (Russian: Лерика), is a Moldovan-Russian singer and songwriter. She represented Moldova in the Junior Eurovision Song Contest 2011 with the song "No-No", and Russia in the 2012 contest with "Sensatsiya". This made her the second Junior Eurovision Song Contest entrant to compete twice (the first being Russia in 2009 and 2011 with Ekaterina Ryabova), and the first to represent two countries.

== Life and work ==
Engalycheva was born in Olomouc, in the Czech Republic, to a Russian family. She first began singing at the age of four. She moved to Moldova at a young age, where her grandmother lived, and then moved to Russia with her family at age 13, settling in Moscow. Throughout her childhood, Engalycheva participated in a number of European singing competitions, including Slavianski Bazaar in Vitebsk, Orpheus in Italy, New Wave Junior, and Kinotavrik.

At age 12, Engalycheva was selected to represent Moldova at the Junior Eurovision Song Contest 2011 in Yerevan, with the song "No-No". She ultimately placed sixth, earning 78 points; this became Moldova's most successful participation in the contest to date. After moving to Russia in 2012, Engalycheva competed in the Russian national final for the Junior Eurovision Song Contest 2012 in Amsterdam, with the song "Sensatsiya". She went on to win the competition, earning the right to represent Russia; this made Engalycheva the second artist to compete at the Junior Eurovision Song Contest twice, and the first to represent two different countries. She ultimately placed fourth, receiving 88 points.

Engalycheva studied at Moscow Art Theatre School, where she graduated in 2023. She speaks Russian, English, Romanian, and French, and has released music in Russian, English, and Romanian.

In 2022 Engalycheva was a contestant on the tenth season of Vocea României (The Voice of Romania). As part of Irina Rimes's team, she got to the Battles round, before being eliminated.

== Discography ==
=== Singles ===
Year	Title	English Translation	Album
2009	"Pogoda razgulyalasy" (Погода разгулялась)	Weather cleared up	Non-album singles
2009	"Enigma lumini"	Enigma lights	Non-album singles
2011	"No-No"	—	Non-album singles
2012	"Sensatsiya" (Сенсация)	Sensation	Non-album singles
2013	"Lyubov" (Любовь)	Love	Non-album singles
2013	"Moy okean" (Мой океан)	My ocean	Non-album singles
2014	"Serdtse znayet" (Сердце знает)	The heart knows	Non-album singles

Awards and achievements
Preceded by Ștefan Roșcovan with "Ali Baba"	Moldova in the Junior Eurovision Song Contest; 2011	Succeeded by Denis Midone with "Toate vor fi"
Preceded by Ekaterina Ryabova with "Romeo and Juliet"	Russia in the Junior Eurovision Song Contest; 2012	Succeeded by Dayana Kirillova with "Dream On"
