= Kandis kingdom =

Kingdom based on the island of Sumatra c. 1 BCE

Kingdom of Kandis
- c. 1st century BC
- Religion: Hinduism, Buddhism
- Government: Monarchy
- History
  - Established: c. 1st century BC
Succeeded by
Koto Alang; Dharmasraya
- Today part of: Indonesia; West Sumatra; Jambi; Riau

Kandis was a kingdom based in the western-central region of Sumatra island, which is part of the modern-day Indonesian regions of West Sumatra, Jambi, and Riau.

The kingdom of Kandis is estimated to have been established since c. 1st century BC. Kandis is mentioned as one of the Majapahit territories (Nusantara) in an Old Javanese literary work of Nagarakretagama written in 1365 by Mpu Prapanca.
