= Candy (Malaysian band) =

All-female rock band from Malaysia

- Origin: Kuching, Sarawak; Malaysia
- Genres: Rock; Heavy metal Hard rock
- Years active: 1996–present
- Label: Life Records
- Members: Patricia Robert; Nancy Graggory; Anis Kalisa; Bulan Terry
- Past members: Jacqueline Chong; Kim Herrin; Mary Morss; Cornie Sangid

Candy is a Malaysian rock band formed in 1996. Originating from Kuching, Sarawak, they were recognised by the Malaysia Book of Records as the first all-women band in Malaysia.

Candy found fame with their first album Candy which went platinum when the hit single Akan Ku Tunggu was released in 1997.

Candy's best-known line-up comprised Patricia Robert (lead vocals and guitar), Mary Morss (lead guitar and vocals), Cornie Sangid (drums, percussion and vocals) and Nancy Graggory (bass guitar and vocals).

== History ==
=== Pre-Candy years (1988–1996) ===
In 1988, in her hometown of Kuching, band founder Mary persuaded her younger sister Cornie to bring together a group of friends to form a band. The original line-up consisted of Mary (guitars and vocals), Cornie (drums), Magdalen Julita Tom (bass guitar), Veronica Ng (vocals) and Marilyn Ryne (vocals). They called themselves The Sapphire Gals.

Though essentially an all-female band they were joined by keyboardist Rodney Hughes who was the only male member of the band. Rodney left in 1989 and the band was without a keyboardist. Marilyn Ryne and Veronica also left the band around this time and Meggry Graggory took over the vocal duties.

In 1990, keyboardist Yolanda Entika joined the group and the band's name was changed to D'Rozza. In 1991, they discussed adding another guitarist. Nancy finally met Mazlila Mazlan or better known as Mazleela a took over as lead guitarist, while Mary took over as rhythm guitarist, and Mary and her friends agreed. Around the same time, Magdalene Julita left and was replaced by Nancy Graggory, the older sister of Meggry. Cornie split her time between playing drums in the band and recording a solo album in Iban.

In 1992, Casaphia Studio took them under its wing, and the band changed its name to G-Saphia. The "G” stood for "Girls". Keyboardist Danita Ng joined the band for a short stint. Within the same year, her younger sister Janice took over from her but even Janice did not stay long and left before the year was over. Around this time, Meggry also left the band and was replaced by Patricia Robert who was an Iban language recording artist and a singer attached to the Sarawak State Ministry of Social Development and Urbanization.

In 1994, Mazleela was leaves the band and decided to move to Kuala Lumpur to start focusing as a solo singer and the vacancy was filled by Mary who was absorbed as the lead guitarist while Pat was a vocalist and also acted as the rhythm guitarist. At the same time, keyboardist Ophelia June joined G-Saphia. Ophelia is the younger sister of Rodney Hughes.

The band, under the names of Sapphire Gals and G-Saphia, performed in private and public functions around Kuching and other towns in Sarawak. The functions included events such as the Malaysia Day celebrations and Police Day.

=== Peak of popularity (1996–2004) ===
In 1996 Ophelia June left the band, and the four remaining members left their hometown of Kuching and moved to Kuala Lumpur to record their first album. The band also changed their name to Candy.

Candy (now made up of Mary, Cornie, Nancy and Patricia) relocated to Kuala Lumpur in 1996. Patricia took up the second guitarist role and continued as lead singer. Under the guidance of producer Edrie Hashim Candy spent 1996 recording their first album Candy, and released it in 1997. The single Akan Ku Tunggu became a radio hit, thanks in part to a catchy video.

In 1998 Candy recorded their second album Hot with producer Mat Noh Hendrix at the helm. Mat Noh was chosen for his experience in performing, recording and producing in a heavy metal band – he was a member of the heavy metal band Rusty Blade. Unlike the first album, Patricia did not do all lead vocals as Nancy sang lead vocals for Warisan, Emansipasi, Puas Hatiku and Taufan Yang Kecewa, while Resah had Cornie singing lead. Singer Royce Sa'yan sang the backing vocals in the song "Emansipasi". The album also contained a cover of the Iron Maiden instrumental piece "Transylvania".

Nancy left Candy in 1999, citing personal reasons. She was replaced by Jacqueline Chong, who had previously played bass for The Beads. Jacqueline played during Candy's live shows from 1999 to 2004 but never recorded an album with them.

=== Line-up changes and third album (2004–2011) ===
In 2004, Jacqueline left Candy to continue her studies and Nancy rejoined the band.

After 10 years, Candy finished recording their third and final album titled Absolute, which was released under the CD Baby label.

The album was released in January 2009. The album had 10 songs, 6 of which are English songs, marking the first time that Candy recorded in English, while the rest as well as Malay language songs. This album is also the first album to contain English-language songs.

=== Candy hiatus and revival (2012–present day) ===
Candy received the DAMA (Dayak Artist Music Association) Special Award on 24 November 2012 which was presented by DAMA chairman Snowdan Lawan in the presence of the Minister of Social Development, Tan Sri William Mawan Ikom.

Candy again experienced member changes in 2016, during which time original members Mary and Connie left the group to be replaced by guitarist Anis Kalisa and Kim Herrin on drums.

Candy performed at the Tribute Concert for the late Search drummer Yazit Ahmad on 6 and 7 December 2019 at the Anniversari Theatre, Kuala Lumpur. The concert featured hundreds of native singers and musicians, including Hattan, Aris Ariwatan, Ekamatra, Man Kidal, Nash, Dayangku Intan, Hujan, Kugiran Masdo and many more.

In 2022, Candy announced that drummer Bulan Terry had joined in place of Kim Herrin. The new line-up of Patricia, Anis, Nancy and Bulan began recording with their long-time producer Edrie.

Meanwhile, in March 2023, the band was part of a record-breaking performance involving 80 female musicians at a concert in Port Dickson.

On Sept 29, 2024, Candy released a new music video for a song called Setia2U.

It was the band’s first release in more than 10 years.

== Discography ==
=== Albums ===
- Candy (1997)
1. "Akan Ku Tunggu"
2. "Persada Harapan"
3. "Jaringan"
4. "Suara Hatiku"
5. "Bebas Semula"
6. "Dunia Baru"
7. "Bagaikan Permata"
8. "Akukah Yang Bersalah"
9. "Osmosis"
10. "Abadi"
- Hot (1999)
1. "Warisan"
2. "Racun Pujangga"
3. "Emansipasi"
4. "Inikah Keadilan"
5. "Ikrar Perwira"
6. "Puas Hatiku"
7. "Transylvania" (instrumental, Copyright Controlled – Steve Harris)
8. "Taufan Yang Kecewa"
9. "Biasalah Beb"
10. "Nyanyian Zaman Buaian"
11. "Tong Kosong"
12. "Resah"
- Absolute (2008)
1. "Kerana Dia"
2. "Creep"
3. "Terasing"
4. "Still in My Life"
5. "Takkan Pernah"
6. "Leave Me Alone"
7. "I Still Want You"
8. "The Chase (On-On)"
9. "Let Go"
10. "Nyanyian Alam"
