= Cesare Candi =

Italian luthier (1869 - 1947)

Candi, Cesare - (b Minerbio, near Bologna, 5 March 1869; d Genoa, 29 Sept 1947) was an Italian instrument maker.

== Living Museum ==
Discover the history of the Bolognese School Bolognese Violin Makers
