= Ivan Ivanov (singer) =

Bulgarian singer and songwriter

Ivan Ivanov Иван Иванов
- Born: Ivan Ivanov; 7 April 2000 (age 26)
- Origin: Gorna Oryahovitsa, Bulgaria
- Genres: Pop-rock
- Occupations: singer, songwriter
- Instrument: Vocals
- Years active: 2009–present

Ivan Ivanov (Bulgarian: Иван Иванов; born 7 April 2000) is a Bulgarian singer and songwriter.

== Life and work ==
Ivan Ivanov was born on 7 April 2000 in Gorna Oryahovitsa, a small town in northeastern Bulgaria. Ivanov first became interested in music when he was 7 years old, but started to sing at the age of 8.

His very first single "Kurazh" (Courage) was released in June 2009, in which he rose to fame.

== 2010–present ==
He released his first "mature" single (his second original hit single) in January 2010, titled "Po-trudno" (Harder).

He released his third single "Tova Ne e Taka" (It's not so") in August 2010.

Ivanov represented Bulgaria in the Junior Eurovision Song Contest 2011 in Yerevan, Armenia on 3 December with his song "Supergeroy" (Superhero), placing 8th with a total of 60 points.

He commentated on the live stream of Junior Eurovision Song Contest 2015 on JuniorEurovision.tv alongside the website's editor Luke Fisher.

== Discography ==
=== Singles ===
Year	Title	English Translation	Album
2009	"Kurazh"	My courage	Non-album singles
2010	"Po-trudno"	Harder	Non-album singles
2010	"Tova Ne e Taka"	It is not so	Non-album singles
2011	"Supergeroy"	Superhero	Non-album singles
2013	"Az Sŭm Vlyuben"	I'm in love	Non-album singles
2013	"Naopaki"	Inside out	Non-album singles
2013	"Razbiram"	Understand	Non-album singles
2013	"Glava Igri"	Head games	Non-album singles

Awards and achievements
Preceded by Krestiana Kresteva with "Edna mechta"	Bulgaria in the Junior Eurovision Song Contest; 2011	Succeeded by Krisia, Hassan Ignatov Ibrahim Ignatov with "Planet of the Children"
