= Macedonia in the Junior Eurovision Song Contest 2011 =

- Junior Eurovision Song Contest 2011
- Participating broadcaster: Macedonian Radio Television (MRT)
- Country: Macedonia
- Selection process: Dečja pesna Eurovizije
- Selection date: 24 September 2011

Competing entry
- Song: "Žimi ovoj frak"
- Artist: Dorijan Dlaka
- Songwriters: Dorijan Dlaka

Placement
- Final result: 12th, 31 points

Participation chronology

Macedonia participated in the Junior Eurovision Song Contest 2011 and selected its entry by a national final. Dorijan Dlaka with the song “Žimi ovoj frak” won the national final and represented Macedonia at Junior Eurovision 2011. Dorijan Dlaka got 12th place with 31 points.

== Before Junior Eurovision ==
=== Dečja pesna Eurovizije ===
The submission window for the national final was held until 1 September 2011. After the submission window closed, MRT received 12 entries, which 5 of them were selected to compete in the national final. The participants of the national final were revealed on 9 September 2011. Among the participants was Dorijan Dlaka who previously was the backing dancer for the 2010 Junior Eurovision Macedonian entry.

The final was held on 24 September 2011 in MKRTV studios. The final was hosted by Elizabeth and Anja Veterova. The results were decided by 50% professional jury and 50% public voting.

Final - 24 September 2011
R/O	Artist	Song	Jury	Televote		Total	Place
R/O	Artist	Song	Jury	Votes	Points	Total	Place
1	Ivana Simoska	“Vo srcevo”	7	379	10	17	2
2	Gjorgji Gjorgjiev	“Igraj”	5	1	5	10	5
3	Teodora Nastoska	“Srekja”	8	134	7	15	3
4	Kjara Golja	“Novo chuvstvo”	6	26	6	12	4
5	Dorijan Dlaka	“Žimi ovoj frak”	10	201	8	18	1

== At Junior Eurovision ==
Macedonia performed 8th in the running order of Junior Eurovision Song Contest 2011, following Ukraine and preceding Netherlands. Dorijan Dlaka got 12th with 31 points out of the 13 countries, with the highest score from a country being 5 points from Moldova. Anja Veterova announced the Macedonian points for the contest.

Points given to Macedonia
Score	Country
12	
10	
8	
7	
6	
5	Moldova
4	Lithuania
3	Belarus
3	Georgia
2	Belgium
1	Netherlands
1	Russia

Points given by Macedonia
Score	Country
12	Bulgaria
10	Lithuania
8	Latvia
7	Armenia
6	Moldova
5	Georgia
4	Belgium
3	Belarus
2	Netherlands
1	Ukraine
